= Middle Forge Junction =

Middle Forge Junction is an important junction on the Dean Forest Railway.

== History ==
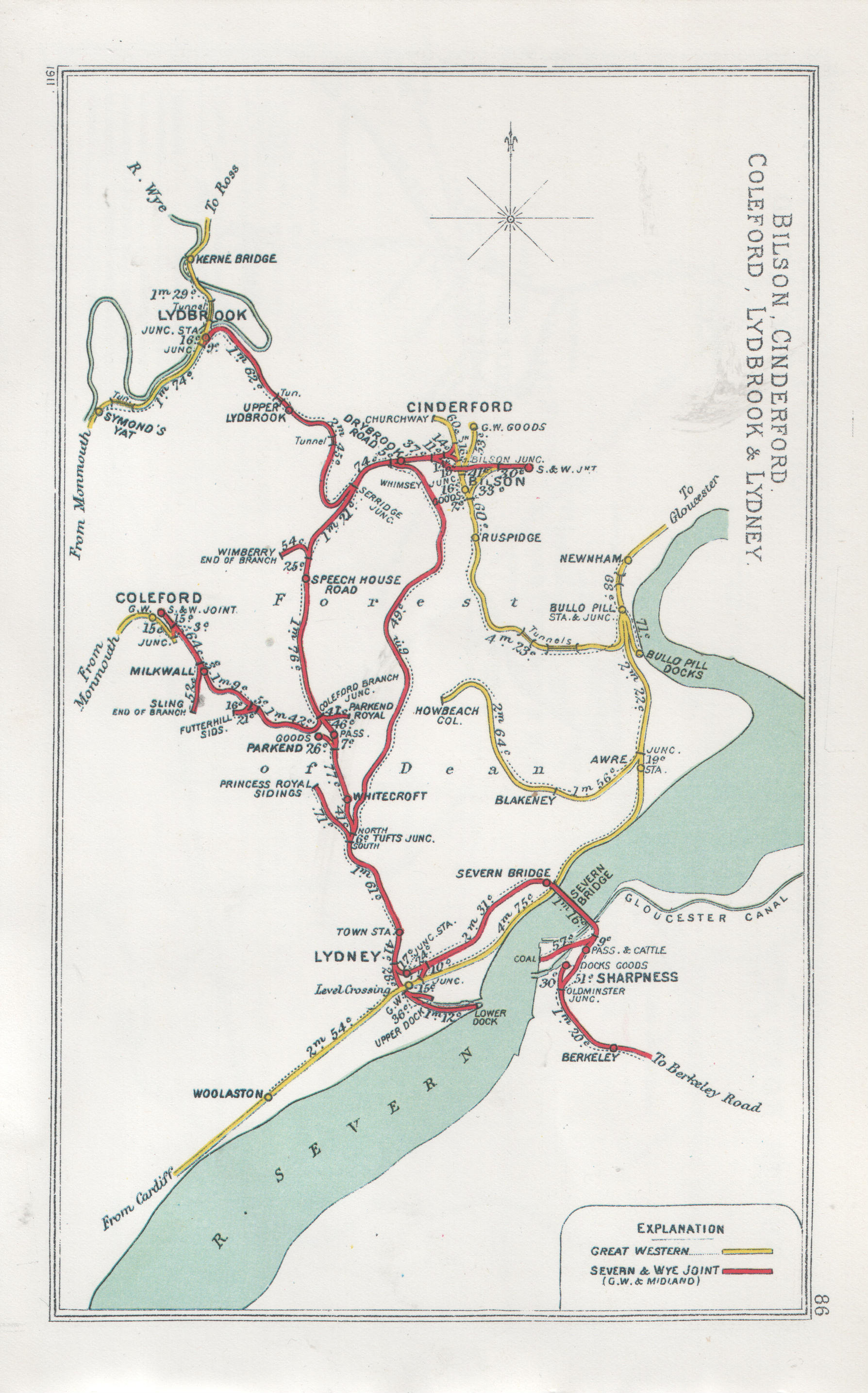
A 1911 RCH map of railways in the vicinity of Middle Forge Junction.

The junction is where the Lydney to Parkend (High Level) and Lydney to Norchard (Low Level) lines meet.

The name Middle Forge was chosen because the junction is close to one of three Forges in valley of the River Lyd.

One forge is located near to Tufts Junction and the other past Lydney Junction.

Middle Forge is 450 yards (410 m) away from Norchard and consists of a three lever ground frame locked by a Token.

The Norchard Low-Level outer home is located on the Lydney Town side of the junction and is interlocked with the ground frame.

The signal is the longest pull from Norchard 'box and is worked from lever No. 13.

A cable tensioner is located behind the lever frame to help with expansion and contraction of the cable over its length.

== See also ==
- Dean Forest Railway
