= Tufts Junction =

Coordinates: 51.73034°N 2.53603°W

Tufts Junction was a junction on the Severn and Wye Railway between Lydney Town and Whitecroft, England. The junction is now on the Dean Forest Railway between Norchard and Whitecroft.

== History ==
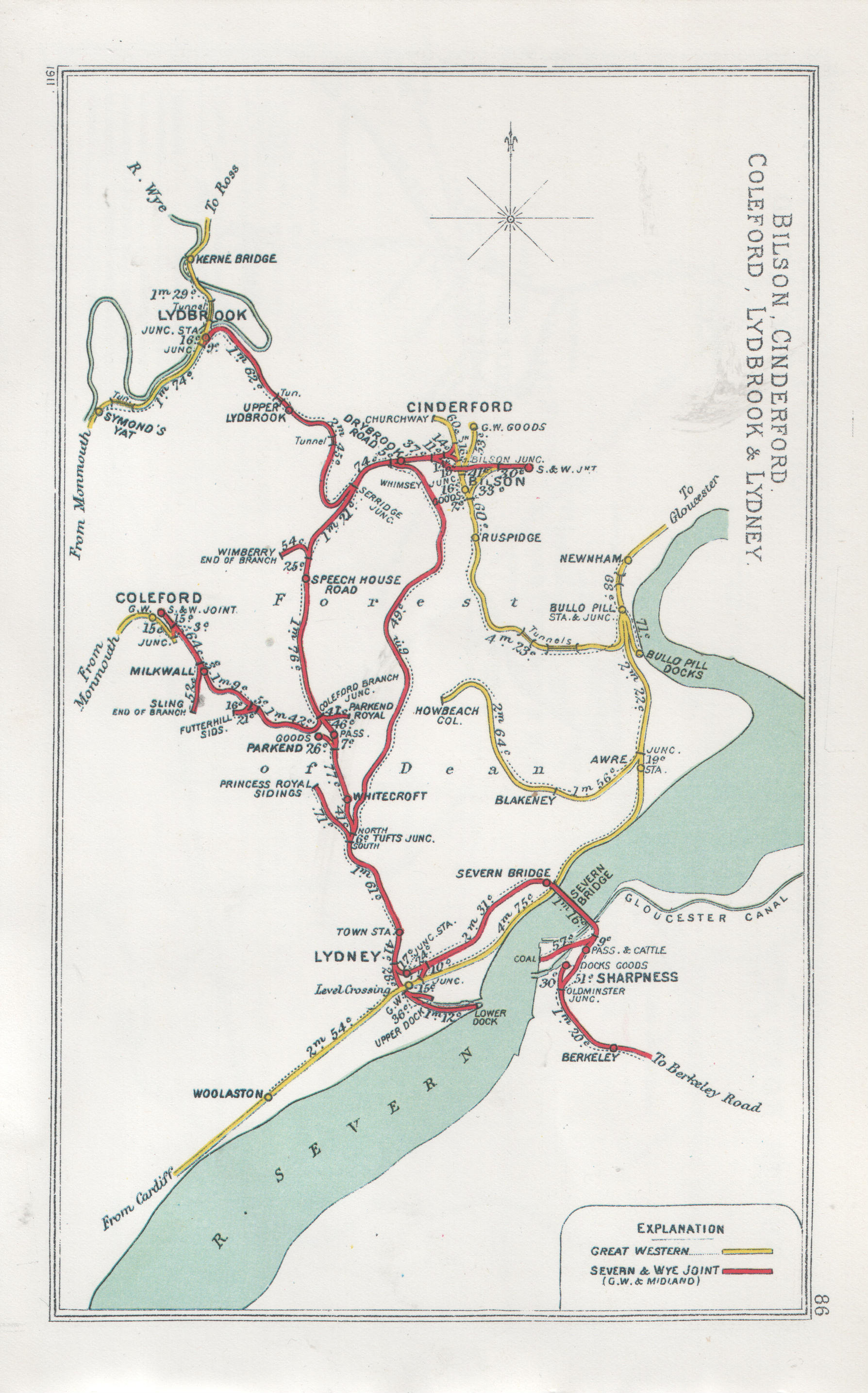
A 1911 Railway Clearing House map of railways in the vicinity of Tufts Junction

The junction is where the Mineral loop and branch to Parkhill Colliery branched off from the main Severn and Wye line from Lydney to Lydbrook and Cinderford. The single line diverged into three. It was used to carry coal from local collieries.

All three lines were closed between the 1950s and 1970s.

The main line through the junction has been restored by the Dean Forest Railway which runs between Lydney Junction and Parkend.
