= List of United Kingdom locations: White =

The United Kingdom

This is part of the list of United Kingdom locations: a gazetteer of place names in the United Kingdom showing each place's locality and geographical coordinates.

== White ==
Location	Locality	Coordinates (links to map & photo sources)	OS grid reference
Whiteacre	Kent	51.18°N 01.01°E	TR1147
Whiteash Green	Essex	51.93°N 00.60°E	TL7930
White Ball	Somerset	50.96°N 03.29°W	ST0919
Whitebirk	Lancashire	53.74°N 02.45°W	SD7028
Whitebridge	Highland	57.20°N 04.51°W	NH4815
Whitebrook	Monmouthshire	51.75°N 02.68°W	SO5306
Whitebushes	Surrey	51.20°N 00.16°W	TQ2847
Whitecairns	Aberdeenshire	57.24°N 02.13°W	NJ9217
Whitechapel	County of the City of London	51.51°N 00.08°W	TQ3381
Whitechapel	Lancashire	53.86°N 02.68°W	SD5541
Whitechurch Maund	Herefordshire	52.13°N 02.64°W	SO5649
Whitecliff	Gloucestershire	51.78°N 02.63°W	SO5610
Whiteclosegate	Cumbria	54.90°N 02.92°W	NY4157
White Colne	Essex	51.92°N 00.71°E	TL8729
White Coppice	Lancashire	53.65°N 02.59°W	SD6118
Whitecote	Leeds	53.82°N 01.63°W	SE2436
Whitecraig	East Lothian	55.91°N 03.04°W	NT3570
Whitecraigs	East Renfrewshire	55.78°N 04.31°W	NS5557
Whitecroft	Gloucestershire	51.75°N 02.56°W	SO6106
Whitecrook	Renfrewshire	55.89°N 04.40°W	NS5069
Whitecross (Crowlas)	Cornwall	50.15°N 05.47°W	SW5234
Whitecross (St Breock)	Cornwall	50.51°N 04.87°W	SW9672
Whitecross (Lanteglos)	Cornwall	50.33°N 04.62°W	SX1352
Whitecross	Dorset	50.78°N 02.76°W	SY4699
Whitecross	Falkirk	55.96°N 03.66°W	NS9676
Whitecross (Drayton)	Somerset	51.01°N 02.85°W	ST4024
Whitecross	Staffordshire	52.79°N 02.20°W	SJ8622
White Cross (Stowey-Sutton)	Bath and North East Somerset	51.31°N 02.58°W	ST5958
White Cross (High Littleton)	Bath and North East Somerset	51.30°N 02.54°W	ST6256
White Cross (Cury)	Cornwall	50.04°N 05.24°W	SW6821
White Cross (Mid Cornwall)	Cornwall	50.39°N 04.97°W	SW8959
White Cross	Herefordshire	52.05°N 02.74°W	SO4940
White Cross (Brent Knoll)	Somerset	51.23°N 02.94°W	ST3449
White Cross	Wiltshire	51.08°N 02.32°W	ST7732
White Cross Hill	Cambridgeshire	52.35°N 00.18°E	TL4975
White End	Worcestershire	52.00°N 02.32°W	SO7834
Whitefarland	North Ayrshire	55.62°N 05.40°W	NR8642
Whitefaulds	South Ayrshire	55.34°N 04.69°W	NS2909
Whitefield	Bury	53.55°N 02.28°W	SD8106
Whitefield	Dorset	50.74°N 02.14°W	SY9094
Whitefield	Somerset	51.05°N 03.32°W	ST0729
Whitefield Lane End	Knowsley	53.39°N 02.82°W	SJ4589
Whiteflat	East Ayrshire	55.49°N 04.34°W	NS5225
Whiteford	Aberdeenshire	57.32°N 02.48°W	NJ7126
Whiteford Point	Swansea	51.63°N 04.24°W	SS449958
White Gate (or Whitegate)	Oldham	53.52°N 02.16°W	SD8903
White Gate	Somerset	50.84°N 02.93°W	ST3406
Whitegate	Cheshire	53.21°N 02.57°W	SJ6269
White Grit	Powys	52.57°N 03.01°W	SO3198
Whitehall	City of Bristol	51.46°N 02.56°W	ST6174
Whitehall (Marwood)	Devon	51.11°N 04.10°W	SS5337
Whitehall (Hemyock)	Devon	50.91°N 03.25°W	ST1214
Whitehall	Hampshire	51.26°N 00.94°W	SU7452
Whitehall	Hertfordshire	51.96°N 00.06°W	TL3331
Whitehall	Lancashire	53.67°N 02.47°W	SD6920
Whitehall	Orkney Islands	59.13°N 02.61°W	HY6528
Whitehall	West Sussex	50.97°N 00.39°W	TQ1321
White Hall	Hertfordshire	51.87°N 00.14°W	TL2821
Whitehaven	Cumbria	54.54°N 03.59°W	NX9718
Whitehaven	Shropshire	52.80°N 03.09°W	SJ2624
Whitehawk	Brighton and Hove	50.82°N 00.11°W	TQ3304
Whiteheath Gate	Sandwell	52.48°N 02.04°W	SO9787
Whitehill	East Sussex	51.04°N 00.15°E	TQ5129
Whitehill	Hampshire	51.10°N 00.87°W	SU7934
Whitehill	Kent	51.29°N 00.86°E	TR0059
Whitehill	Midlothian	55.88°N 03.04°W	NT3566
Whitehill	Moray	57.57°N 02.78°W	NJ5354
Whitehill	South Lanarkshire	55.78°N 04.07°W	NS7057
Whitehill	Staffordshire	53.08°N 02.24°W	SJ8454
White Hill	Bath and North East Somerset	51.30°N 02.41°W	ST7156
White Hill	Bradford	53.85°N 02.00°W	SE0040
White Hill	Dorset	51.06°N 02.27°W	ST8130
White Hills	Northamptonshire	52.26°N 00.91°W	SP7464
Whitehills	Aberdeenshire	57.67°N 02.58°W	NJ6565
Whitehills	Angus	56.64°N 02.88°W	NO4651
Whitehills	Gateshead	54.93°N 01.56°W	NZ2860
Whitehills	South Lanarkshire	55.74°N 04.18°W	NS6352
Whiteholme	Lancashire	53.86°N 03.03°W	SD3241
Whitehough	Derbyshire	53.33°N 01.95°W	SK0382
White House	Suffolk	52.07°N 01.10°E	TM1346
Whitehouse	Aberdeenshire	57.21°N 02.63°W	NJ6214
Whitehouse	Argyll and Bute	55.79°N 05.49°W	NR8161
Whitehouse	Milton Keynes	52.03°N 0.82°W	SP813378
Whitehouse Common	Birmingham	52.57°N 01.80°W	SP1397
Whitehouse Green	Berkshire	51.40°N 01.06°W	SU6568
White Houses	Nottinghamshire	53.30°N 00.93°W	SK7179
Whiteinch	City of Glasgow	55.86°N 04.35°W	NS5366
White Island	Isles of Scilly	49.97°N 06.28°W	SV928176
Whitekirk	East Lothian	56.02°N 02.65°W	NT5981
Whiteknights	Berkshire	51.44°N 00.95°W	SU7372
Whitelackington	Somerset	50.93°N 02.88°W	ST3815
White Lackington	Dorset	50.78°N 02.41°W	SY7198
White Ladies Aston	Worcestershire	52.16°N 02.11°W	SO9252
Whiteleaf	Buckinghamshire	51.72°N 00.82°W	SP8104
Whiteleas	South Tyneside	54.96°N 01.43°W	NZ3663
Whiteleaved Oak	Herefordshire	52.01°N 02.36°W	SO7535
Whitelee	Northumberland	55.33°N 02.45°W	NT7105
Whitelee	Scottish Borders	55.56°N 02.69°W	NT5630
White Lee	Kirklees	53.72°N 01.66°W	SE2225
Whitelees	South Ayrshire	55.54°N 04.55°W	NS3931
White-le-Head	Durham	54.88°N 01.73°W	NZ1754
Whiteley Bank	Isle of Wight	50.62°N 01.22°W	SZ5581
Whiteley Green	Cheshire	53.29°N 02.12°W	SJ9278
Whiteley Village	Surrey	51.34°N 00.43°W	TQ0962
White Lund	Lancashire	54.05°N 02.85°W	SD4462
Whitelye	Monmouthshire	51.70°N 02.71°W	SO5101
Whitemans Green	West Sussex	51.00°N 00.14°W	TQ3025
White Mill	Carmarthenshire	51.86°N 04.23°W	SN4621
Whitemire	Highland	57.56°N 03.72°W	NH9754
Whitemoor	Cornwall	50.37°N 04.85°W	SW9757
Whitemoor	Nottinghamshire	52.97°N 01.19°W	SK5442
Whitemoor	Warwickshire	52.34°N 01.57°W	SP2972
White Moor	Derbyshire	53.02°N 01.46°W	SK3648
Whitemore	Staffordshire	53.13°N 02.18°W	SJ8860
Whitemyres	Aberdeenshire	57.36°N 02.43°W	NJ7430
Whitenap	Hampshire	50.97°N 01.47°W	SU3720
White Ness	Shetland Islands	60.17°N 01.31°W	HU3844
Whiten Head	Highland	58.57°N 04.55°W	NC513680
White Notley	Essex	51.83°N 00.58°E	TL7818
White Oak	Kent	51.407°N 00.154°E	TQ499697
Whiteoak Green	Oxfordshire	51.82°N 01.50°W	SP3414
White Ox Mead	Bath and North East Somerset	51.32°N 02.40°W	ST7258
Whiteparish	Wiltshire	51.00°N 01.65°W	SU2423
White Pit	Lincolnshire	53.27°N 00.05°E	TF3777
Whitepits	Wiltshire	51.13°N 02.23°W	ST8437
White Post	Kent	51.14°N 00.14°E	TQ5041
White Post	Nottinghamshire	53.10°N 01.07°W	SK6257
Whiterashes	Aberdeenshire	57.29°N 02.25°W	NJ8523
Whiterigg	Scottish Borders	55.57°N 02.69°W	NT5631
White Rocks	Herefordshire	51.91°N 02.83°W	SO4324
White Roding	Essex	51.79°N 00.26°E	TL5613
White Roothing	Essex	51.79°N 00.26°E	TL5613
Whiterow	Highland	58.41°N 03.11°W	ND3548
White's Green	West Sussex	51.01°N 00.66°W	SU9425
Whiteshill	Gloucestershire	51.76°N 02.23°W	SO8407
Whiteshill	South Gloucestershire	51.50°N 02.52°W	ST6479
Whiteside	West Lothian	55.88°N 03.66°W	NS9667
Whitesmith	East Sussex	50.89°N 00.16°E	TQ5213
Whitespots	Dumfries and Galloway	55.18°N 03.72°W	NX9089
White Stake	Lancashire	53.71°N 02.72°W	SD5225
Whitestaunton	Somerset	50.88°N 03.02°W	ST2810
Whitestone	Devon	50.72°N 03.61°W	SX8693
Whitestone	Warwickshire	52.49°N 01.44°W	SP3889
White Stone	Herefordshire	52.07°N 02.64°W	SO5642
Whitestreet Green	Suffolk	52.01°N 00.86°E	TL9739
Whitewall Common	Monmouthshire	51.57°N 02.83°W	ST4286
Whitewall Corner	North Yorkshire	54.12°N 00.79°W	SE7970
White Waltham	Berkshire	51.48°N 00.77°W	SU8577
Whiteway	Bath and North East Somerset	51.36°N 02.41°W	ST7163
Whiteway	Dorset	50.63°N 02.18°W	SY8782
Whiteway (Miserden)	Gloucestershire	51.78°N 02.13°W	SO9110
Whiteway (Horsley)	Gloucestershire	51.68°N 02.23°W	ST8498
Whitewell	Cornwall	50.58°N 04.75°W	SX0580
Whitewell	Lancashire	53.90°N 02.53°W	SD6546
Whitewell	Wrexham	52.96°N 02.76°W	SJ4941
Whitewell Bottom	Lancashire	53.70°N 02.25°W	SD8323
