= Whitehill (disambiguation) =

Whitehill is a surname.

Whitehill may also refer to the following places:

- Whitehill, Hampshire
- Whitehill, Kent
- Whitehill, Hamilton, Scotland
- Whitehill, Lesotho
- Whitehill, Midlothian
- Whitehill, Staffordshire

== See also ==
- White Hill (disambiguation)
- Whitehills
