= Lydney railway station =

Railway station in Gloucestershire, England

Lydney
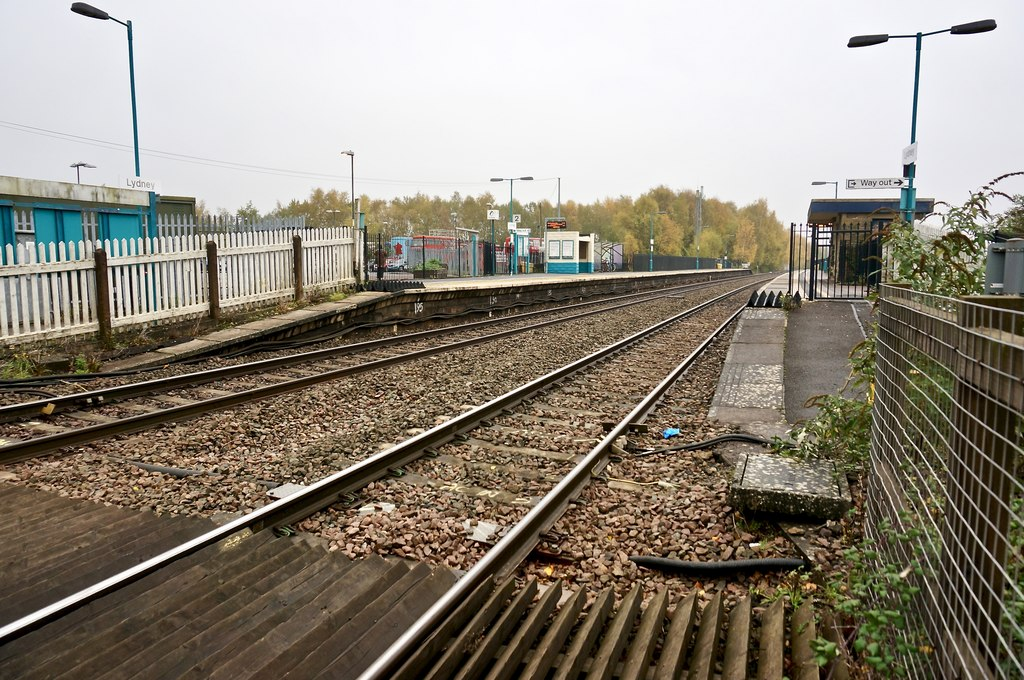

General information
- Location: Lydney, Forest of Dean; England
- Coordinates: 51.715°N 2.531°W
- Grid reference: SO633020
- Managed by: Transport for Wales
- Platforms: 2

Other information
- Station code: LYD
- Classification: DfT category F1

History
- Opened: 1851

Passengers
- 2020/21: ▼34,990
- 2021/22: ▲0.128 million
- 2022/23: ▲0.145 million
- 2023/24: ▲0.170 million
- 2024/25: ▲0.194 million
Location
Notes
- Passenger statistics from the Office of Rail and Road

Lydney railway station is a railway station serving the town of Lydney in Gloucestershire, England. It is located on the Gloucester-Newport line, 133 miles 37 chains (214.8 km) from the zero point at Paddington, measured via Stroud. The station is located a mile south of Lydney, and was originally called Lydney Junction, which is now the name of the nearby station on the preserved Dean Forest Railway.

== History ==
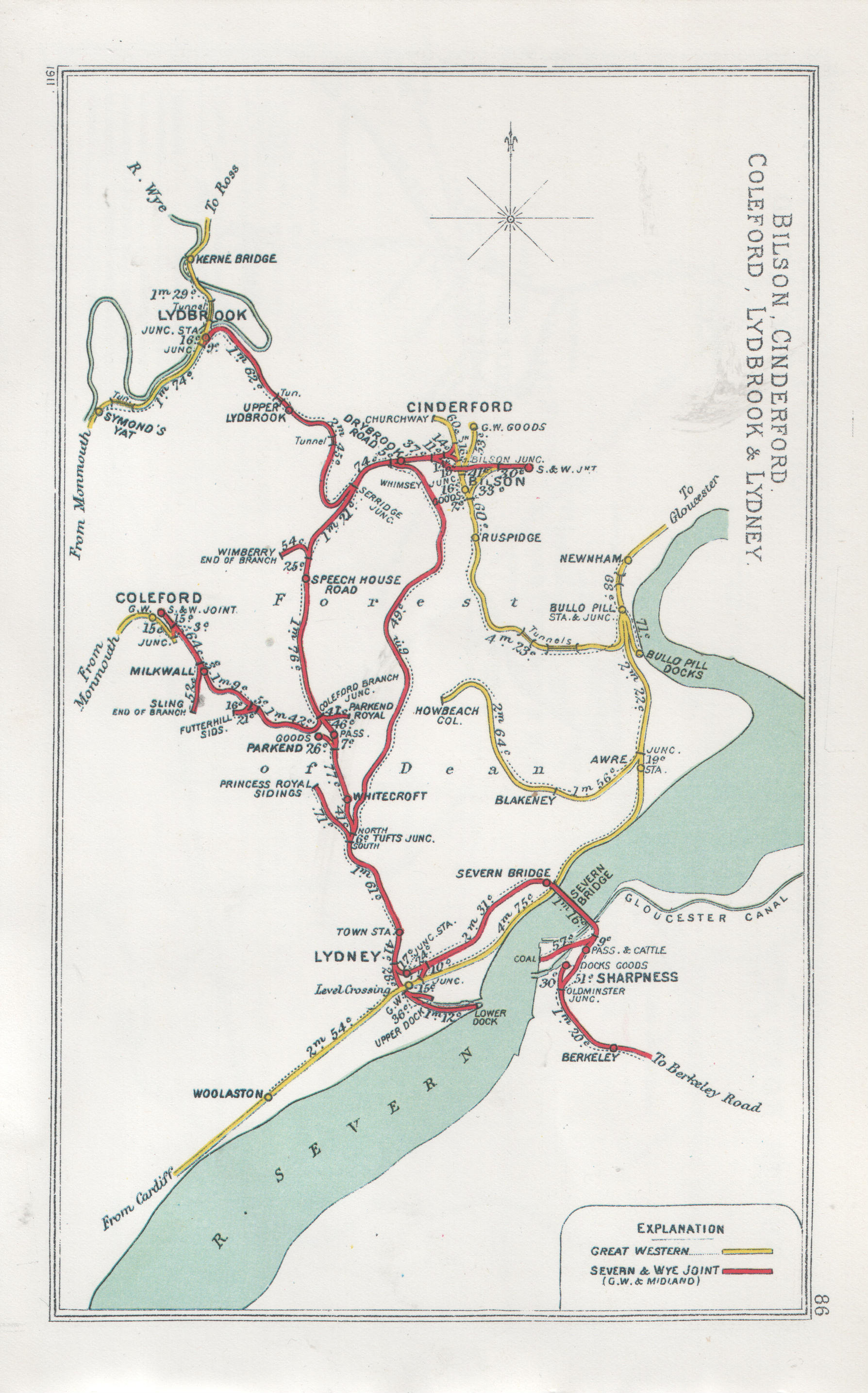
A 1911 Railway Clearing House map of railways in the vicinity of Lydney

Lydney Junction was the name of two separate but adjacent stations on two different railway lines. The Great Western Railway station, which is the one that remains open as Lydney railway station, opened in 1851 on the Gloucester to Chepstow section of the South Wales Railway. To the west of this station, the freight-only line of the Severn and Wye Mineral Railway crossed the GWR line on its north–south route taking coal and iron from the Forest of Dean to the docks at Lydney.

In 1875, the Severn and Wye started passenger services and built a new terminus station at Lydney Junction for passenger trains to and from Drybrook, near Cinderford. Four years later, this first station was superseded by a new one as the Severn and Wye joined with the Midland Railway in building the Severn Bridge Railway, which linked Lydney across the River Severn with the Midland's Sharpness Branch Line, enabling access for the Forest of Dean minerals to the new and more extensive docks at Sharpness.

The new Lydney Junction (Severn and Wye) station was linked by a long footbridge to the GWR's station. There were also extensive freight yards in the north-east quadrant between the two lines, and these provided the only rail link between the Severn and Wye and the Great Western lines. The two stations worked closely together, particularly after 1894, when the Severn and Wye Railway was bought by the Great Western and the Midland. Finally, in 1955, under British Railways, the two stations were formally merged into one.

Lydney Junction (Severn and Wye) was used as a through-station for passenger services to and from Berkeley Road railway station and over the Severn Railway Bridge. These services either terminated at Lydney Town railway station, which was in the centre of Lydney, or continued on northwards into the Forest of Dean to terminate at Lydbrook Junction on the Ross to Monmouth line. These services ceased abruptly in October 1960 when the Severn Railway Bridge was damaged beyond economic repair in a shipping accident. Passenger services were officially withdrawn from this Lydney Junction in November 1964 and it remained closed until reopening by the Dean Forest Railway in 1995.

The other Lydney Junction, then renamed Lydney, lost its freight services in 1968 and its staffing in 1969, and the Great Western buildings on the platforms were demolished, though the signalbox remained until December 2012.

== Facilities ==
The station is unstaffed, but a self-service ticket machine is provided (this can also be used for collecting advance purchase tickets). Train running information is provided by customer help points, digital CIS displays and timetable posters on each platform (along with waiting shelters). Step-free access is offered to both sides via the level crossing.

== Services ==
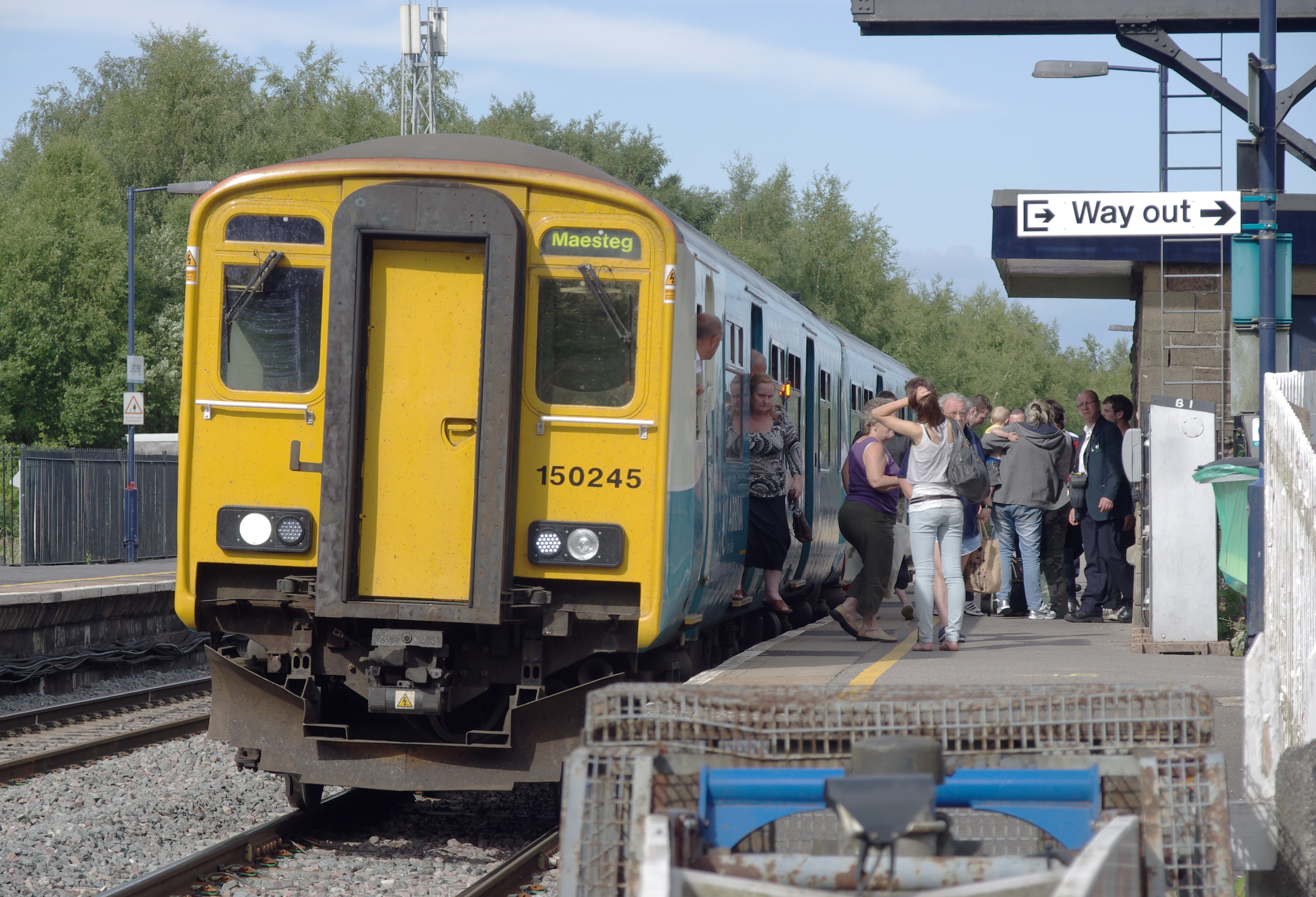
Transport for Wales provide an hourly service each way between Cheltenham Spa and Maesteg via Cardiff Central. In 2010, Arriva Trains Wales Class 150 Sprinter DMU 150245 calls with a service for Maesteg.

The majority of passenger services at Lydney are provided by Transport for Wales, with an hourly Maesteg-Cardiff Central-Cheltenham Spa service in each direction (although there are a couple of gaps during the middle of the day). On Sundays, there is a two-hourly service each way.

CrossCountry also serve the station as part of their Cardiff Central to Nottingham via Birmingham New Street route. Monday to Saturday, there are six trains per day in each direction. There is no Sunday service on this route.

There is no footbridge at the station, and therefore no means of crossing the line to get to the opposing platform once the level crossing gates close in advance of a train arriving.

Preceding station	National Rail	Following station
Chepstow	Transport for Wales; Maesteg / Cardiff Central–Cheltenham Spa	Gloucester
Chepstow	CrossCountry; Cardiff Central–Birmingham New Street / Nottingham (Mondays to Saturdays only)	Gloucester
Heritage railways
Interchange with Lydney Junction on the Dean Forest Railway

== Incidents ==
An incident occurred at the station's level crossing on 23 March 2011 when a fault with the automatic barriers caused a northbound CrossCountry service to pass over the crossing at 60 mph (97 km/h) while the gates were raised (although the traffic lights were red).
