= St Mary's Halt railway station =

Former railway station in Lydney, England

St Mary's Halt
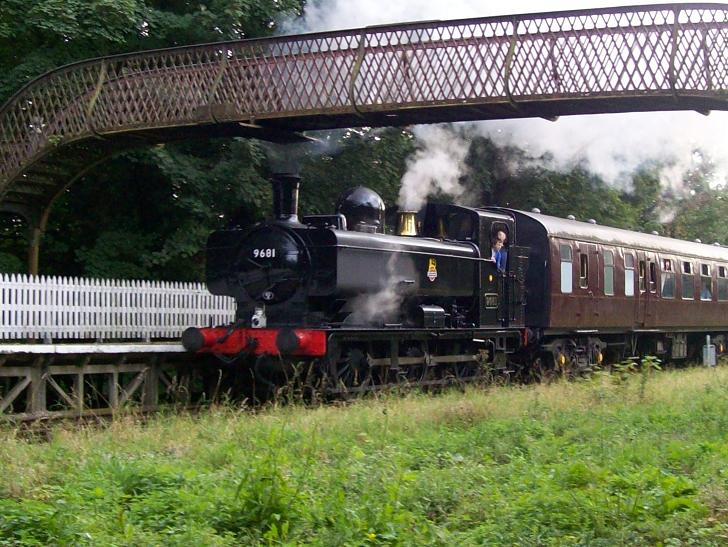
- Pannier 9681 rushes through St Mary's Halt towards Norchard.

General information
- Location: Lydney, Forest of Dean; England
- Coordinates: 51.72°N 2.5308°W
- Grid reference: SO633024
- System: Station on heritage railway
- Operator: Dean Forest Railway
- Platforms: 1

History
- Original company: Dean Forest Railway

Key dates
- 8 September 1991: Opened
- 1 January 2014: Closed
Location

St. Mary's Halt was a small railway station halt on the Dean Forest Railway. It served the local park and lake, both near the station, and was the original southern terminus of the DFR from 1991 to 1995.

== History ==
The halt was not an original station of the Severn and Wye Railway and was opened by the Dean Forest Railway on 8 September 1991. It was originally named Lydney Lakeside, taking its name from the lake behind the platform. From 1991 to 1995 it was the original southern terminus of the Dean Forest Railway prior to the reopening of Lydney Junction in 1995. It was later renamed St Mary's Halt in 1995 - which takes its name from St. Mary's Church, located opposite the platform. The halt was closed to passengers after the 2013 season, but was still used for the operation of the Bypass crossing until January 2016, when the crossing was automated. It will be removed within the foreseeable future for re-use elsewhere on the line.

The Lakeside Extension, which involved the opening of Lydney Lakeside (now St Mary's Halt) was the first major extension that was undertaken by the Dean Forest Railway. The railway had been previously constrained to the Norchard site. To mark this event City of Truro visited the line, only one of two occasions that this has occurred at the DFR (the other in 2010 to mark the 200th anniversary of the Severn and Wye Railway).

This section of the railway still retains some original features; the most notable of these was Grade II listed the cast iron lattice bridge, opened on 26 September 1892, which was demolished by being struck by an engineering train on 14 August 2025.

== Operation ==
Services would always call when travelling to Lydney Junction (a necessity to operate the Bypass Level Crossing). After 2009 however services only called only on request heading towards Norchard, Lydney Town, Whitecroft, and Parkend until closure.

In 1993, five services would operate each running day between April and October (a later service would run on Sundays, Bank Holidays, and other selected days). The first train would depart at 11:00 from the then new Norchard Low Level platform, with a journey time of 10 minutes to the Lakeside. A complete roundtrip would take 35 minutes.

Special services would also run to the halt to provide access to Carol services at St Mary's Church opposite the halt. The train would wait in the platform to take the passengers back from the services, which always proved popular for the Dean Forest Railway.

== Route ==
Preceding station	Heritage railways	Following station
Lydney Town towards Parkend	Dean Forest Railway	Lydney Junction Terminus
