= White Hills =

White Hills or Whitehills may refer to:

- White Hills (Arizona), a range of hills in Mohave County, Arizona
  - White Hills, Arizona, a ghost town in the White Hills of Arizona
- White Hills, a mountain range in Idaho, United States
- White Hills (Inyo County), California, United States
- White Hills, Northamptonshire, a district of Northampton, England
- White Hill (Nova Scotia), Canada
- White Hills (Santa Barbara County), California, United States
- White Hills (Shelton), Connecticut, United States
- White Hills, Tasmania, a locality in Australia
- White Hills, Victoria, Australia
- White Hills (band), an American space rock band
- Whitehills, Aberdeenshire, a village in Scotland
  - Whitehills F.C.
- Whitehills, East Kilbride, a suburb of East Kilbride, Scotland

== See also ==
- White Hill (disambiguation)
- White Mountains (disambiguation)
