= Speech House Road railway station =

Former railway station in England

Speech House Road
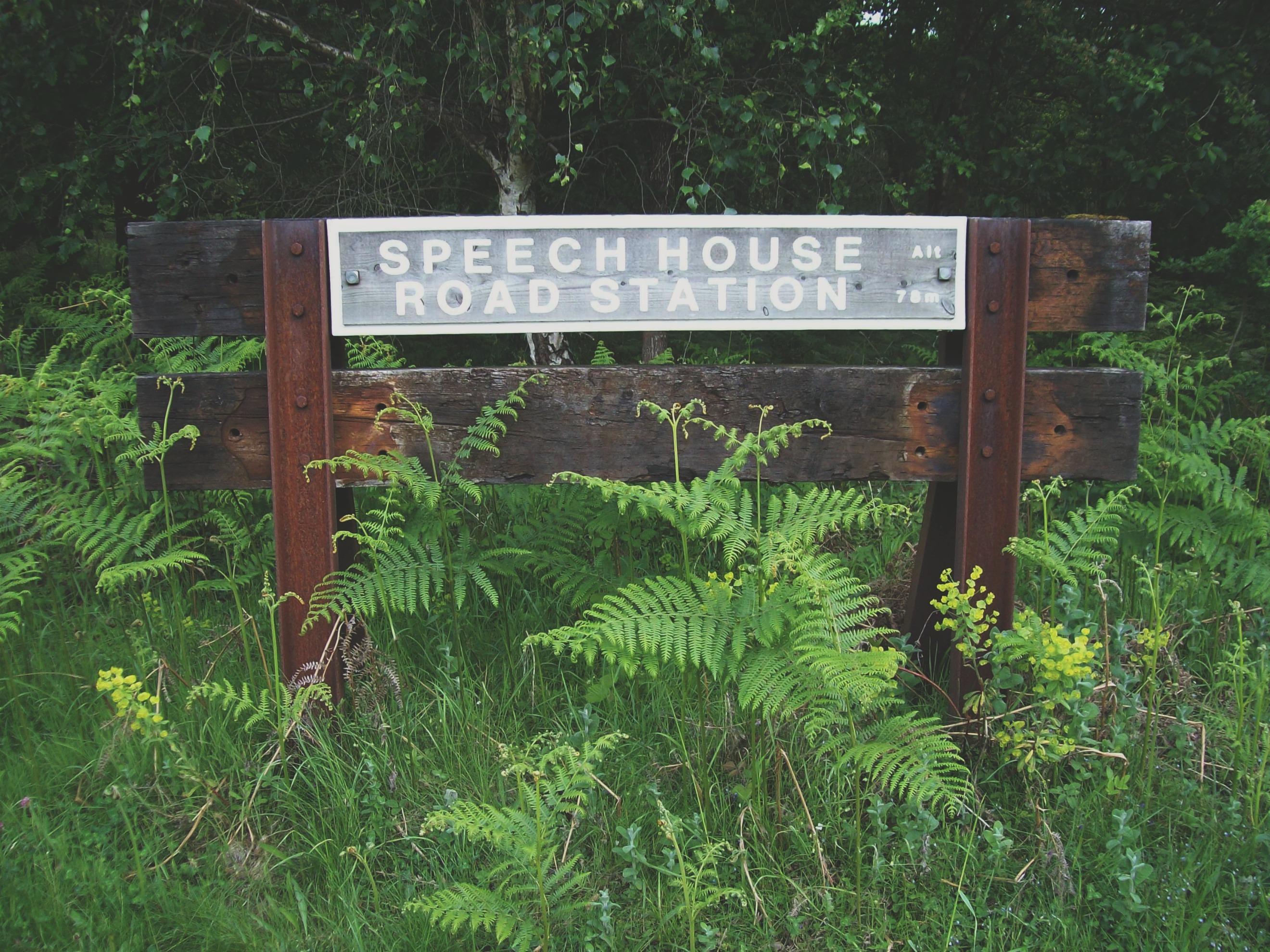
- Sign marking the site of the former station.

General information
- Location: Cannop, Forest of Dean; England
- Coordinates: 51.8020°N 2.5665°W
- Grid reference: SO610116
- Platforms: 1

Other information
- Status: Disused

History
- Original company: Severn and Wye Railway
- Pre-grouping: Severn and Wye and Severn Bridge Railway
- Post-grouping: Severn and Wye and Severn Bridge Railway

Key dates
- 23 September 1875: Opened
- 8 July 1929: Closed to passengers
- 12 August 1963: Closed to freight
Location

Speech House Road railway station is a disused railway station opened by the former Severn and Wye Railway in 1875, it remained open for 88 years until the line, north of Parkend, closed to freight in 1963. Passenger trains on the Severn and Wye Railway, north of Lydney, were withdrawn from 1929.

== History ==
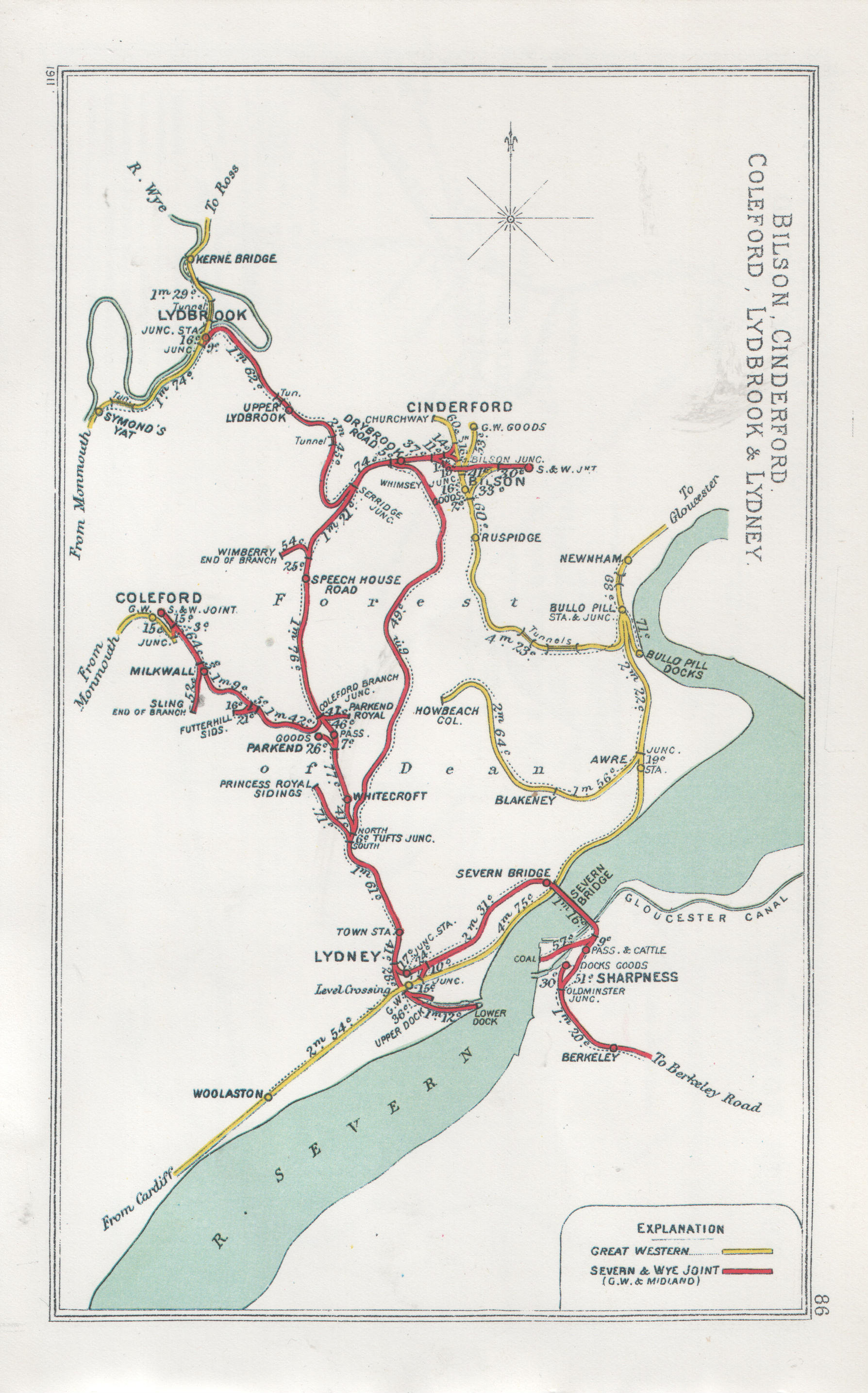
A 1911 RCH map of railways in the vicinity of Speech House Road.

The station was built by the Severn and Wye Railway which ran from Berkeley Road, over the Severn Railway Bridge between Sharpness and Lydney, following the route of the River Lyd to Parkend and finally onto Cinderford.

The station was situated on the south side of the Speech House Road (now the B4226).

The station consisted of one platform with a small building, a passing loop, a signal box opposite the platform building, next to the road crossing. It also had a small goods yard with a facilities for coal, timber and general freight, the station being home to a wooden derrick crane.

The Seven and Wye Railway opened the station as a halt in 1875. The facilities were then expanded by 1878. Cannop Colliery closed in 1960, removing most of the freight traffic that passed through the facilities. In 1963 the line was closed north of Coleford Junction.

== Current usage ==
Nothing remains of the station except the track bed (which is in use as a cycle track). A rail and sleeper name board marks the location of the platform (and the altitude at 78 m / 256 feet) and a pair of false wooden crossing gates - marking where the cycle track crosses the B4226.

The Dean Forest Railway (based at Norchard) planned to eventually extend a further 2 1/2 miles to the site at Speech House Road, (bringing the line up to total of 6 3/4 miles in length): however, the Dean Forest Railway Society later ruled out rebuilding Speech House Road in favour of a site near Beechenhurst Lodge.

== Services ==
Preceding station	Disused railways	Following station
Parkend	Severn and Wye Railway; Later Severn and Wye Joint Railway (MR and GWR)	Serridge Platform
