= Whitecroft =

Village in Gloucestershire, England

Coordinates: 51.7540°N 2.5515°W

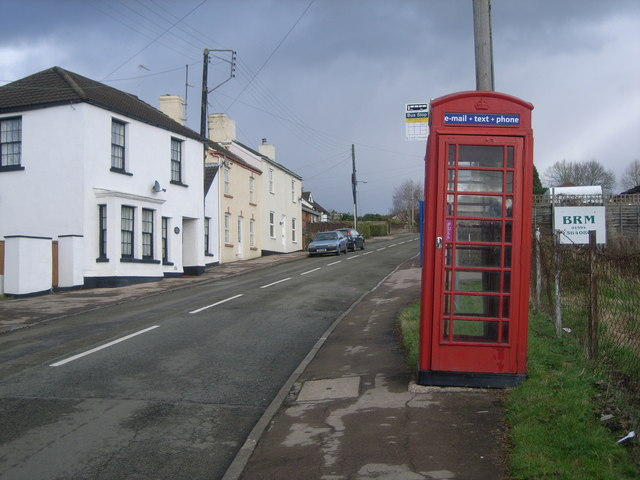

- Location within Gloucestershire
- OS grid reference: SO620062
- District: Forest of Dean
- Shire county: Gloucestershire
- Region: South West
- Country: England
- Sovereign state: United Kingdom
- Post town: Lydney
- Police: Gloucestershire
- Fire: Gloucestershire
- Ambulance: South Western
- UK Parliament: Forest of Dean

Whitecroft is a village in the Forest of Dean in west Gloucestershire, England. It is located in-between Bream and Yorkley. Whitecroft comes under the postal district of Lydney.

The village has 1 pub – The Miners Arms (The Royal Oak having been closed for many years). Providing food, drink and accommodation. Whitecroft railway station, part of the Dean Forest Railway, is near the Miners Arms.

A book titled 'Welcome to Dabdown' was written about the village by the author Jenny Care, published in 2018.

== History ==
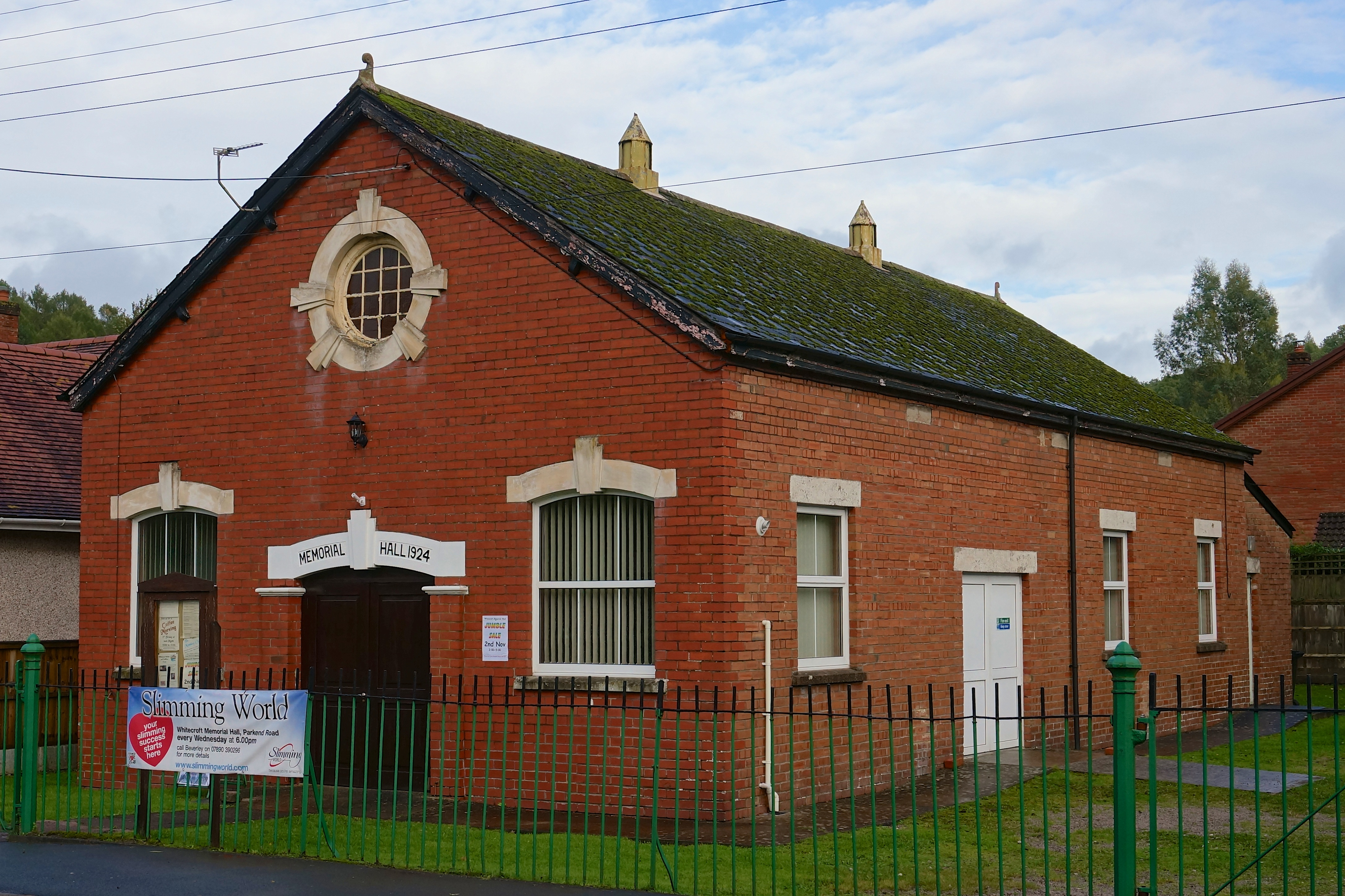
Whitecroft Memorial Hall

Cottages are recorded at Whitecroft in the 1780s. A chapel at Whitecroft dates from 1824. By 1834 terraces containing 30 cottages had been built on either side of the Severn & Wye tramroad (later railway) for employees in the Parkend collieries – they were demolished in the 20th century. In 1841 there were three beerhouses at Whitecroft – one of which has become the Miners' Arms inn. Whitecroft has a memorial hall dating from 1924. The village had a successful rugby club before the World War I and a male voice choir in the mid 20th century. The village continued to expand throughout the 20th & 21st century when estates of private and council housing was built. They remained in operation until the Crown sold them in 1674 for demolition, to preserve the woodland of the Forest. Whitecroft had two corn mills in the early 19th century. One of the mills, in the west part of Whitecroft remained in operation until 1970. In the 19th century there were several coal mines in the area, including Park Gutter west of Whitecroft, and Princess Royal colliery between Whitecroft and Bream's Eaves. There was a factory on the south side of Whitecroft in 1866, and other workshops and industrial sites developed in the 20th century. On the Bream road several brick buildings put up in the early 20th century for Princess Royal colliery still survive.

Whitecroft railway station opened in 1875 as part of the Severn and Wye Railway. The station closed in 1929. It was re-opened to passengers on 25 May 2012 as part of the Dean Forest Railway.

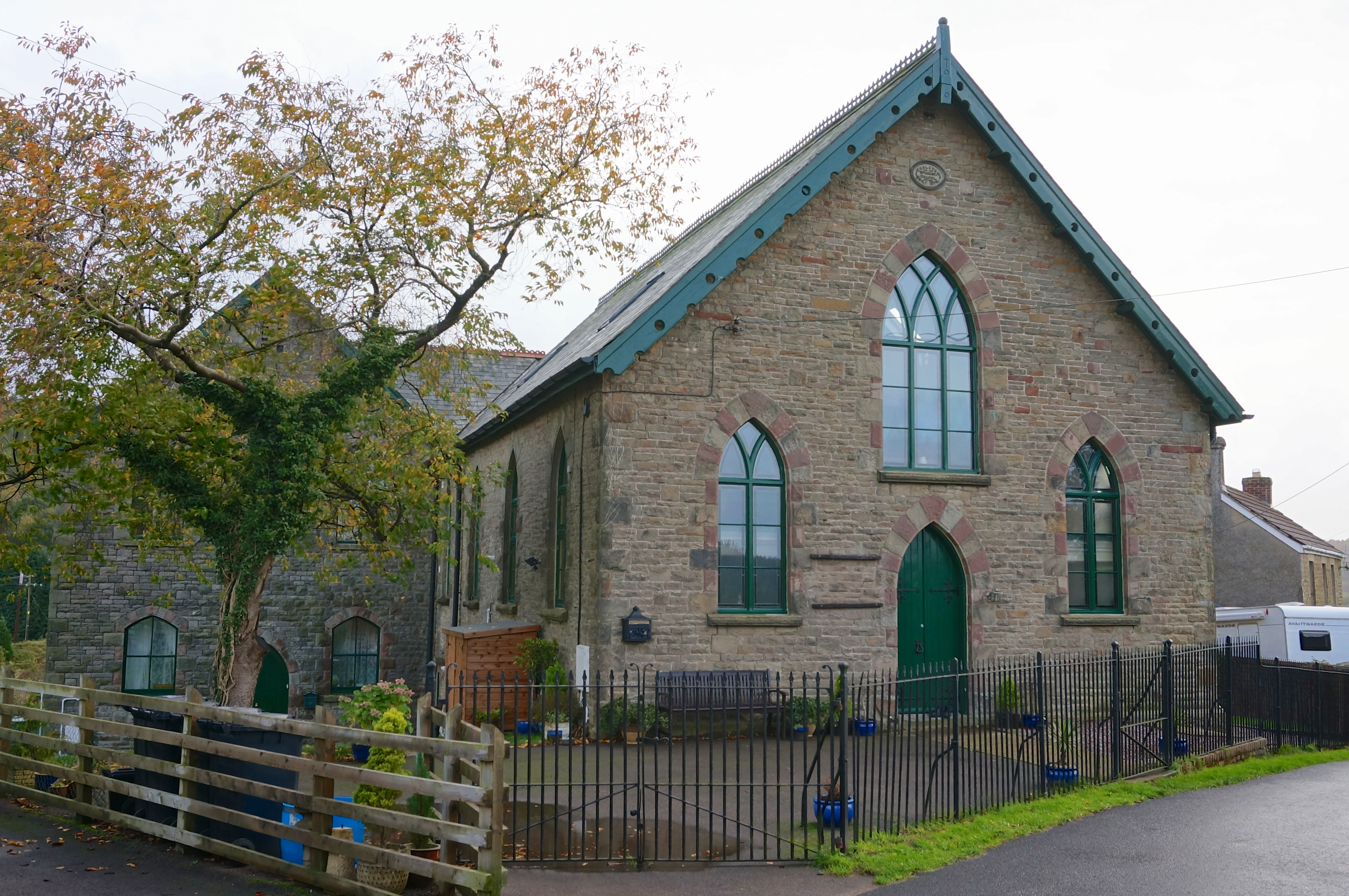
The former Whitecroft Methodist Chapel

== Football club ==
The club currently have one team competing in the North Gloucestershire Football League and play their home games at Grove Road. The club has enjoyed success in the cups and leagues over the years.
