= White Hill =

White Hill may refer to:

== Locations on Earth ==
- White Hill, Ireland, a mountain of 630 metres located in County Wicklow, Ireland
- White Hill (Forest of Bowland), a moor of 544 metres located in the Forest of Bowland, England
- White Hill (Nova Scotia), at 535 metres the highest elevation in Nova Scotia, Canada
- White Hill, South Australia
- White Hill Wind Farm, New Zealand

== Locations on Mars ==
- White Hill, Mars, part of the Apollo 1 Hills group on Mars

== See also ==
- Whitehill (disambiguation)
- White Hills (disambiguation)
- White Mountain (disambiguation)
