= Whitecroft railway station =

Railway station in England

Whitecroft & Bream
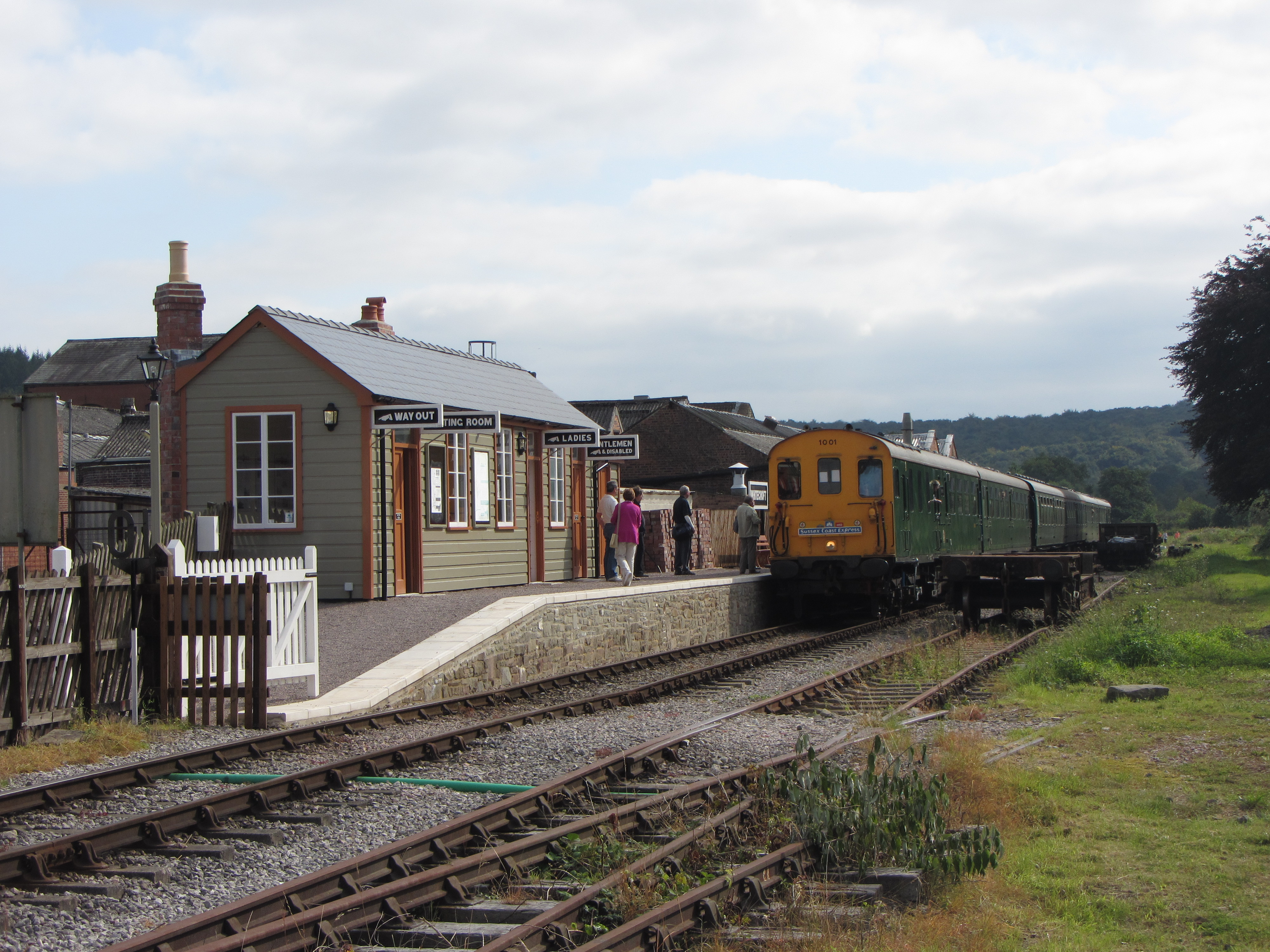

General information
- Location: Whitecroft, Forest of Dean; England
- Coordinates: 51.75290°N 2.55247°W
- Grid reference: SO619062
- System: Station on heritage railway
- Manager: Dean Forest Railway
- Platforms: 1

History
- Original company: Severn and Wye Railway

Key dates
- 23 September 1875: opened
- 8 July 1929: closed for passengers
- 25 May 2012: reopened
Location

Whitecroft & Bream railway station is a railway station on the Dean Forest Railway.

== History ==
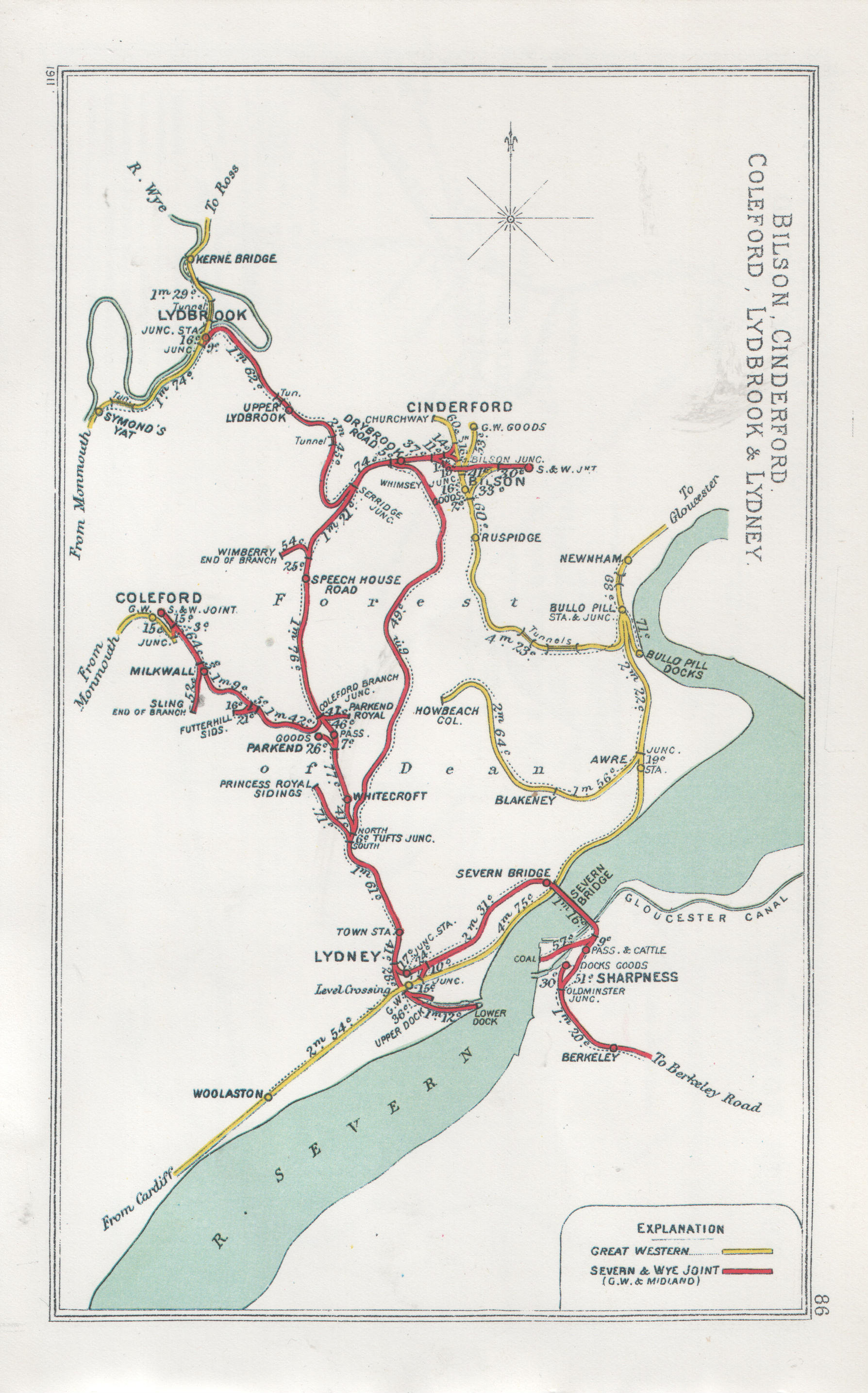
A 1911 RCH map of railways in the vicinity of Whitecroft

The station originally opened on 23 September 1875, and closed on 8 July 1929. It was re-opened to passengers on 25 May 2012 after a construction period of around 18 months.

Much of the funding for the restoration programme came from a Rural Development grant, administered by the Forest of Dean Local Action Group in Coleford. The programme of work involved the construction of a four-coach platform on the Pillowell (up) side of the line, with the new station building be constructed in traditional Severn and Wye style.

Future developments in Whitecroft will include doubling the track through the station, the construction of the second (down) platform on the Bream side of the line and the addition of a goods shed.

== Services ==
Preceding station	Heritage railways	Following station
Parkend Terminus	Dean Forest Railway	Norchard towards Lydney Junction
Disused railways
Parkend; Station restored	Severn and Wye Railway (Later MR and GWR)	Lydney Town; Station restored

== See also ==
- Dean Forest Railway
