= White Mountains =

White Mountains may refer to:

== Mountain ranges ==
Afghanistan and Pakistan

- White Mountains (Spīn Ghar)

Australia

- White Mountains National Park, in Queensland

Greece

- White Mountains (Lefka Ori), on the island of Crete

United States

- White Mountains (Alaska)
- White Mountains (Arizona)
- White Mountains (California) and partly in Nevada
- White Mountains (New England), a range of mountains in New Hampshire and Maine
  - White Mountain National Forest
  - White Mountains Region, a tourist region that encompasses the New Hampshire mountain range

== In fiction ==
- The White Mountains, the first novel in The Tripods trilogy by author John Christopher; the titular mountains are the Alps.
- The White Mountains (Middle-earth), of J.R.R. Tolkien's Middle-earth

== Companies ==
- White Mountains Insurance Group

== See also ==
- White Mountain (disambiguation)
- White Hills (disambiguation)
- Sierra Blanca (disambiguation)
