= Norchard railway station =

Railway station in Gloucestershire, England

Norchard
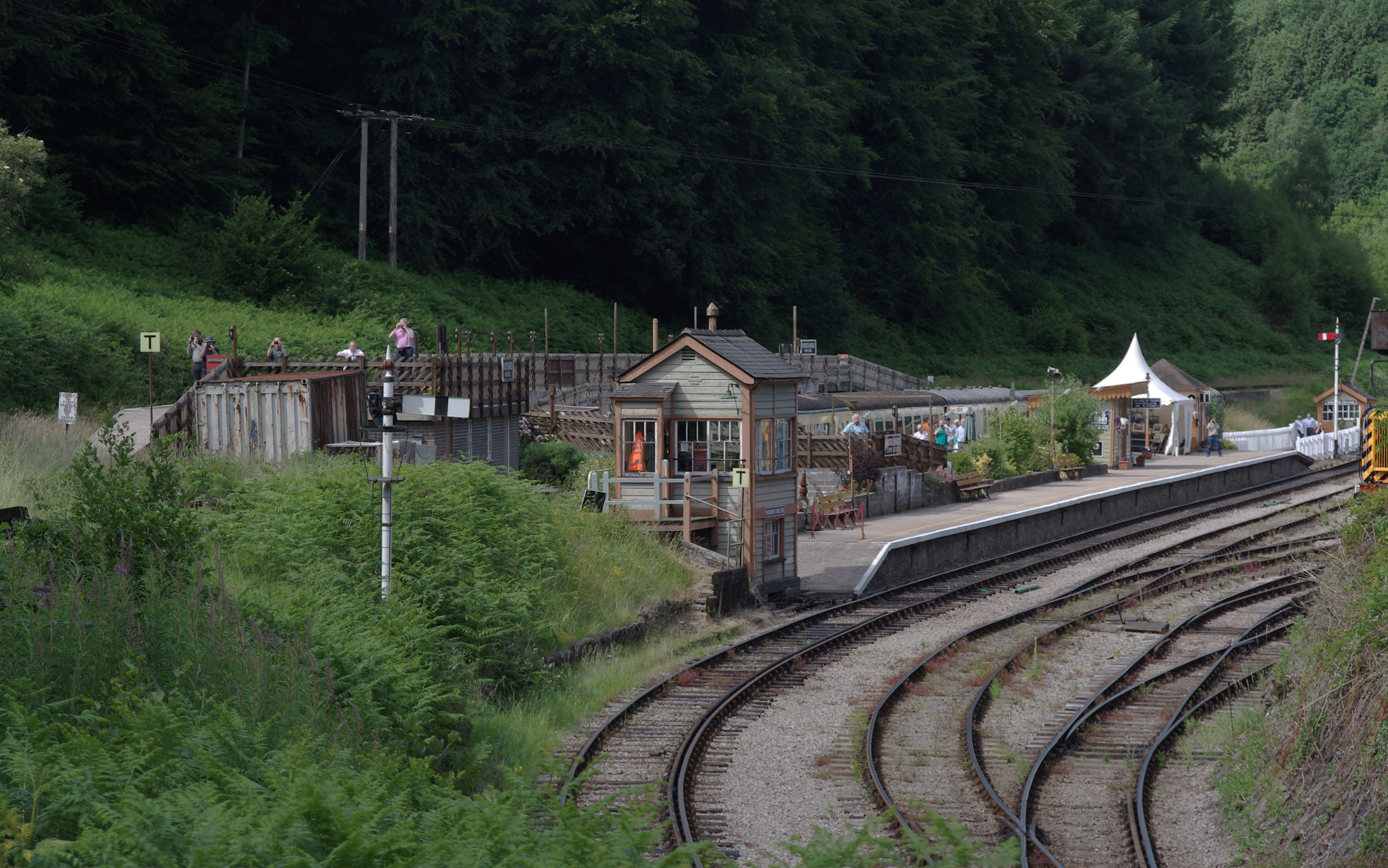

General information
- Location: Norchard, Forest of Dean; England
- Coordinates: 51.73625°N 2.53939°W
- Grid reference: SO628043
- System: Station on heritage railway
- Operator: Dean Forest Railway
- Platforms: 3

History
- Original company: Dean Forest Railway

Key dates
- 1991: opened
Location

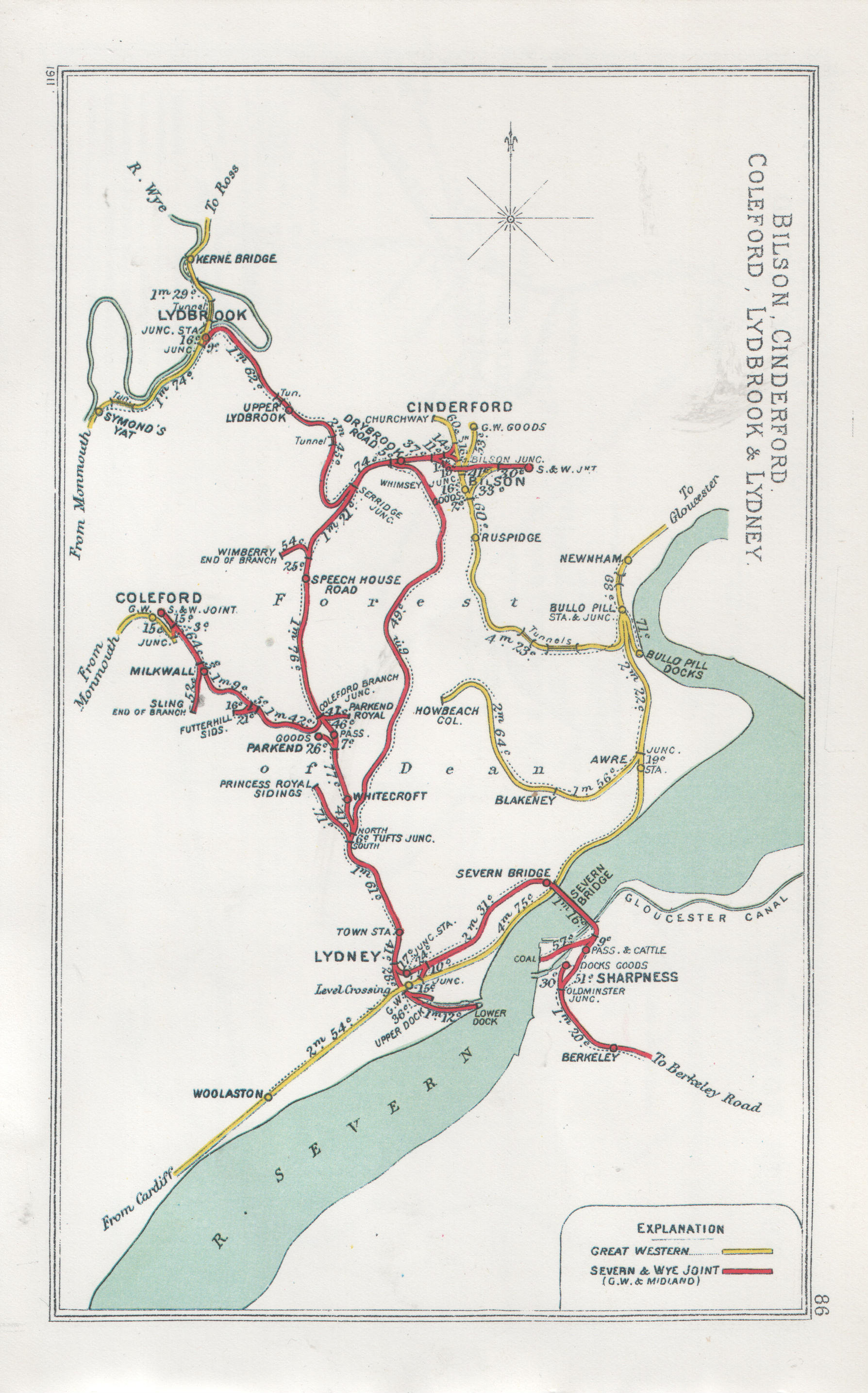
A 1911 Railway Clearing House map of railways in the vicinity of Parkend

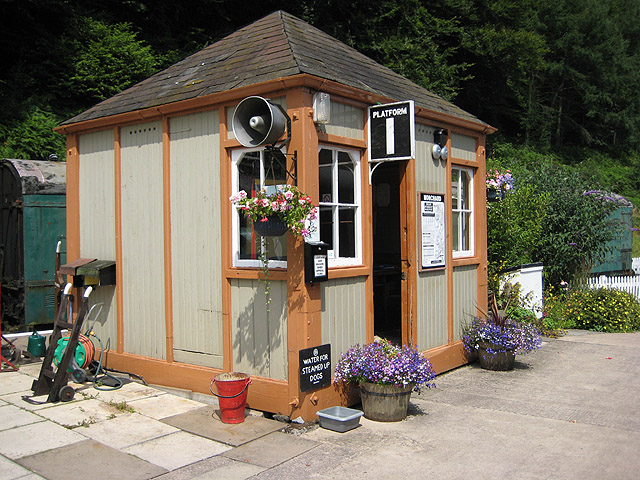
Station master's office - Low Level Platform 1

Norchard is a railway station on the Dean Forest Railway, near Lydney in the Forest of Dean, Gloucestershire.

Norchard is the main station of the Dean Forest Railway. Complete with sidings and a shed, it is the engineering base of the railway. Also to be found at this station are the museum, gift shop, cafe, toilets, main ticket office, and a large free car park. Around Norchard there are many footpaths providing access to the forest, many with views of the trains.

Access between the ticket office and the platforms is via a level crossing. The station has three platforms, two at the Low Level station, plus one at the high level. Platform 2 has the purpose-built cafe and the 9681 shop which is in a coach. Norchard High Level has just one platform (Platform 3), but it serves trains from both Lydney Junction and Parkend, making it the main platform.

== Services ==
| Preceding station | Heritage railways | Following station |
|---|---|---|
| Whitecroft towards Parkend | Dean Forest Railway High Level | Lydney Town towards Lydney Junction |
| Terminus | Dean Forest Railway Low Level | Lydney Town towards Lydney Junction |

== See also ==
- Dean Forest Railway
