= White Mountain =

White Mountain may refer to:

== Mountains ==
- Akdağ, translating as white mountain; several different mountains in Turkey
- Bijela gora, a mountain in Montenegro
- Mont Blanc or Monte Bianco, the highest mountain in the Alps
- Mauna Kea, tallest mountain in Hawai'i
- Paektu Mountain, a volcano on the border between North Korea and China
- Spīn Ghar, a mountain range in eastern Afghanistan
- Slieve Bawn, a 262 m hill in County Roscommon, in the Republic of Ireland, whose name means "white mountain"
- White Mountain (Sperrin Mountains), a 567 m peak in the Sperrin Mountains in Ulster, Northern Ireland
- White Mountain (Yosemite), a peak in Yosemite National Park, California, United States
- White Mountain Peak, a peak in California, United States
- White Mountain (Idaho), or White Mountain West; highest peak in the Salmon River Mountains
- White Mountain (Sevier County, Utah)
- White Mountain (Olympic Mountains), a summit in Olympic National Park, Washington state
- White Mountain (Washington), a summit in Glacier Peak Wilderness
- White Mountain (Wyoming), a long mountain in southwestern Wyoming, United States
- White Mountain in Mineral County, Montana

== Other places ==
- White Mountain National Forest, a national forest in the US
- White Mountain, Alaska, a town in the United States
- White Mountain, County Antrim, a hill and townland in County Antrim, Northern Ireland

== Other uses ==
- White Mountain Apache, a group of Western Apache Native Americans living in Arizona, United States
- The White Mountain School, a private boarding school in New Hampshire, United States
- White Mountain Group, a holding company for many insurance companies
- Battle of White Mountain, a battle in the Thirty Years' War
- White Mountain (song), a song by the rock group Genesis off their album Trespass
- ROKS Baekdusan, a warship name from Baekdusan whose name means "Mount Paektu"

== See also ==
- White Hill (disambiguation)
- False White Mountain, a peak in Yosemite National Park, California, United States
- White Mountains (disambiguation)
- Biała Góra (disambiguation) (Polish for White Mountain), several places in Poland
