= Whitehall, Hampshire =

Hamlet in Hampshire, England

Coordinates: 51.265835°N 0.928001°W

Whitehall
- Location within Hampshire
- OS grid reference: SU7488952399
- District: Hart
- Shire county: Hampshire
- Region: South East
- Country: England
- Sovereign state: United Kingdom
- Post town: ODIHAM
- Postcode district: RG29
- Police: Hampshire and Isle of Wight
- Fire: Hampshire and Isle of Wight
- Ambulance: South Central
- UK Parliament: North East Hampshire

Whitehall is a hamlet in the civil parish of Odiham in Hampshire, England. Its nearest town is Hook, approximately 3.5 miles (5.6 km) away.
