= White Hills, Northamptonshire =

Coordinates: 52.27361°N 0.90956°W

White Hills is a residential district of the town of Northampton, England. It is at the northern limits of the town, north of Kingsthorpe and between the A508 and A5199 roads. The population is included in the Spring Park ward of Northampton.
