= Dean Forest Railway =

Heritage railway in Gloucestershire, England

- 9681 north of Whitecroft station
- Locale: West Gloucestershire

Commercial operations
- Built by: Severn and Wye Railway
- Original gauge: 3 ft 6 in (1,067 mm) (prior to 1868); 7 ft 1/4 in (2,140 mm) Brunel gauge (1868 to 1872); 4 ft 8 1/2 in (1,435 mm) standard gauge (from 1872)

Preserved operations
- Stations: 5 open
- Length: 4 1/4 miles (6.8 km)
- Preserved gauge: 4 ft 8 1/2 in (1,435 mm) standard gauge

Commercial history
- Opened: 1813
- 1868: Converted to 7 ft 1/4 in (2,140 mm) Brunel gauge
- 1872: Converted to 4 ft 8 1/2 in (1,435 mm) standard gauge
- Closed: 1977

Preservation history
- 1970: The Society is formed
- 1971: First open day at Parkend
- 1978: First open day at Norchard
- 1983: The Duke of Gloucester visits
- 1986: Route purchased from BR
- 1991: Norchard to Lakeside opened
- 1995: Lakeside to Junction opened
- 2001: Lydney Town opened
- 2002: Norchard to Tufts opened
- 2003: Tufts to Whitecroft opened
- 2006: Parkend opened by Princess Anne
- 2012: Whitecroft opened
- Headquarters: Norchard

The Dean Forest Railway is a 4 1/4-mile (6.8 km) long heritage railway that runs between Lydney and Parkend in the Forest of Dean, Gloucestershire, England.

The route was part of the former Severn and Wye Railway which ran from Lydney to Cinderford. The society that operates the line started steam locomotive operations in 1971, and bought the trackbed and line from British Rail in 1986, reaching Lydney Junction in 1995 and Parkend in 2005. Trains are operated by both steam and heritage diesel locomotives, and heritage diesel multiple units.

The Dean Forest Railway has been given the former Panteg and Griffithstown railway station building. Its removal was completed in June 2016, and is expected to be placed at the new upcoming Speech House Road.

The Dean Forest Railway plans to extend its heritage services a further 2 1/2 miles (4.0 km) through/into the middle of the Royal Forest at Speech House Road (close to the nearby Beechenhurst Visitor Attraction), bringing the line to a total of about 6 3/4 miles (10.9 km) in length. In 2016, DFR's director of civil engineering and director of development Jason Shirley announced plans to expand the railway to Cinderford. The project's status as a strategic regional development means that a large proportion of the estimated £8million cost could be met by Government funding. As of 2025, progress has been slow, with the extension being delayed by a proposal for a new level crossing at Travellers Rest that requires the permission of the Office of Rail and Road.

== Stations and junctions of the DFR ==
Point	Coordinates (Links to map resources)	OS Grid Ref	Notes
Lydney Junction	51.7153°N 2.5309°W	SO63410197	
St Mary's Halt	51.72°N 2.5308°W	SO63420249	Closed
Lydney Town	51.7258°N 2.5321°W	SO63340314	
Norchard	51.7362°N 2.5394°W	SO62840430	
Tufts Junction	51.7303°N 2.5360°W	SO63070364	Closed
Whitecroft	51.7529°N 2.5525°W	SO61950616	
Parkend	51.7676°N 2.5565°W	SO61690780	

- Lydney Junction (Terminus)
- St Mary's Halt (now closed, yet still in place).
- Lydney Town
- Middle Forge Junction – Line splits into High and Low Levels. No Station.
  - Norchard Low Level (Terminus) – includes a railway museum and shop
- Norchard High Level – ramp and steps from Norchard Low Level
- Tufts Junction – Historic junction with disused mineral loop and freight branch. No Station.
- Whitecroft
- Parkend (Current Terminus)

=== Proposed future extension ===
- Coleford Junction Halt
- Bicslade Wharf
- Speech House Road
- Cinderford

== Accidents and incidents ==
In August 2007, a volunteer who was opening a level crossing gate was badly injured when a train going at an excessive speed struck the gate. Underlying factors included inexperienced train crew and faulty equipment.

In March 2020, a wagon that was awaiting restoration was set on fire at St. Mary's.

In August 2025, a 19th-century footbridge at St. Mary's was brought down by a digger that was being transported by a train. The digger had been inadequately stowed by an inexperienced volunteer.

== Locomotives ==
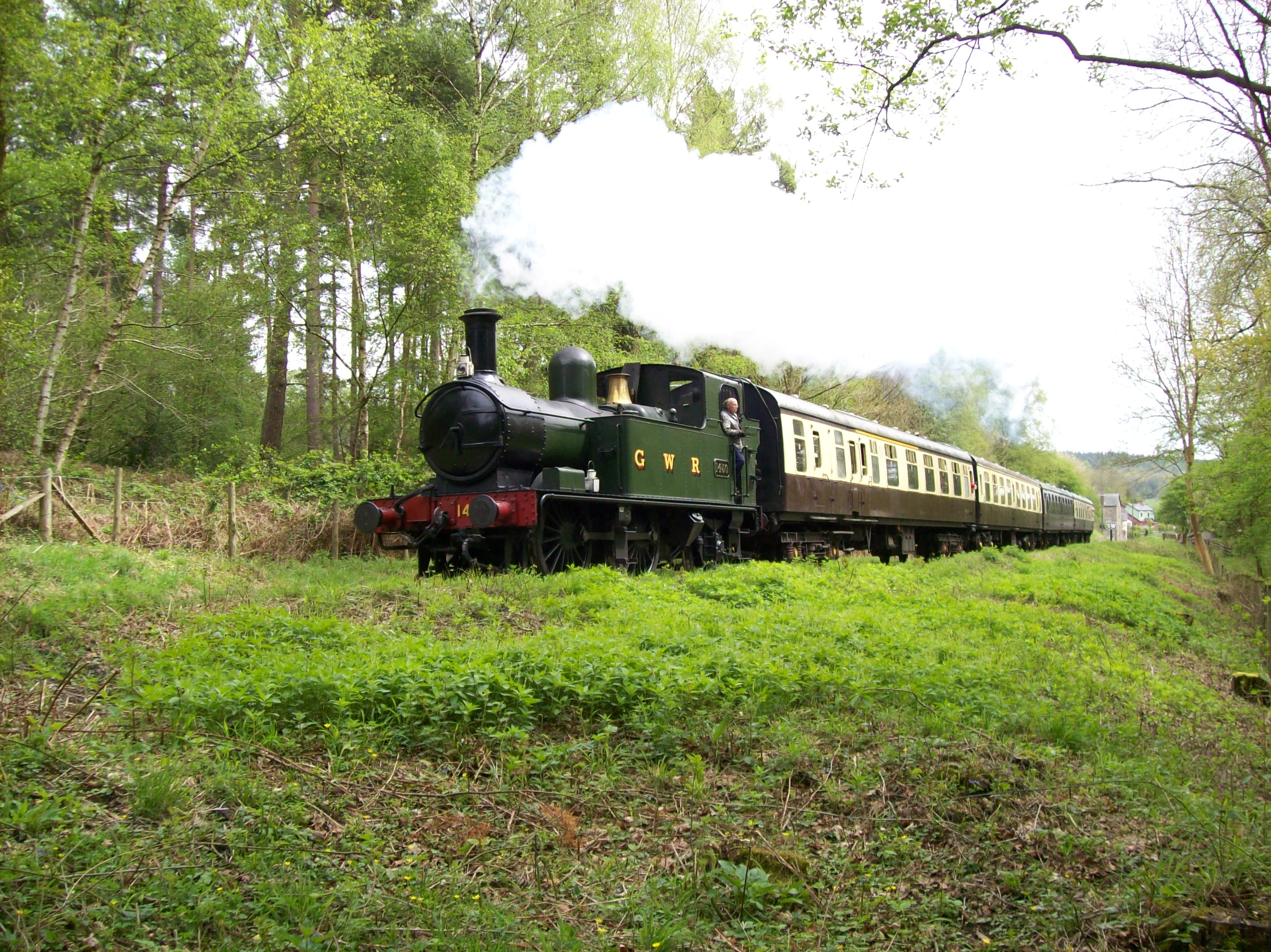
1450 passes through Oakenwood, just north of Whitecroft.

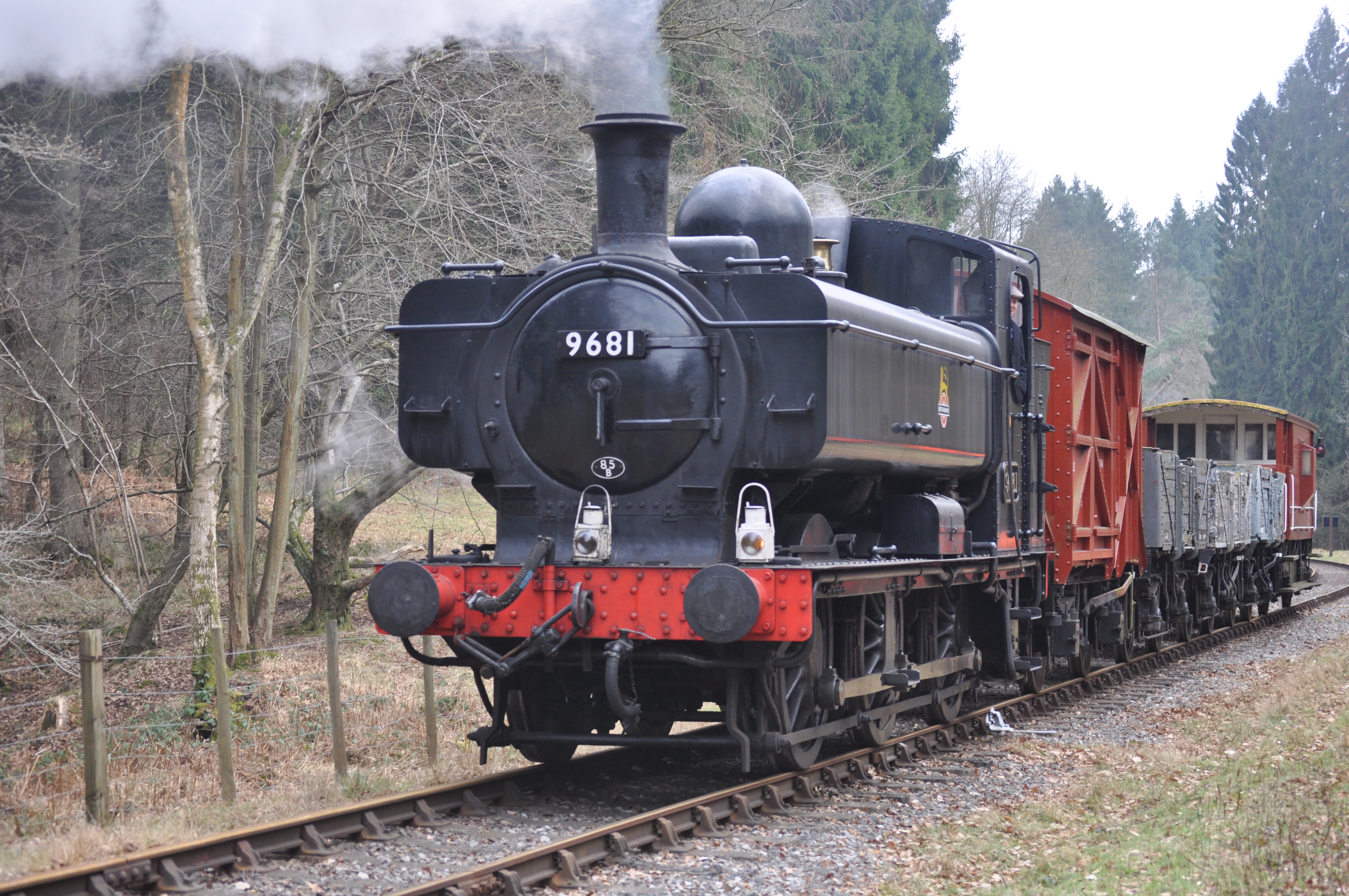
9681 hauling goods into Parkend.

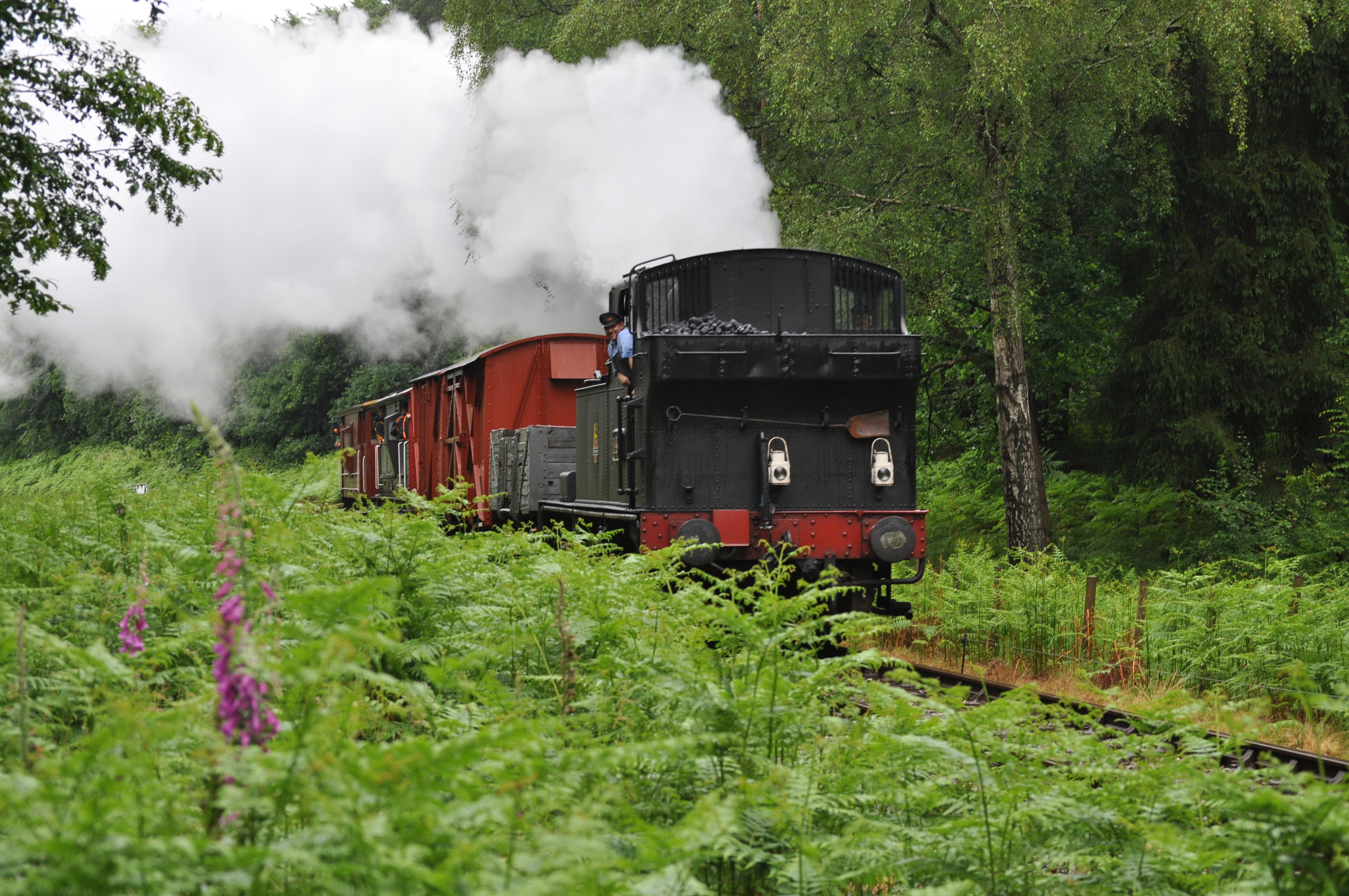
1450 masquerading as 1401 as part of DFR's Titfield Thunderbolt Weekend.

=== Steam ===
Number & Name	Description	Current Status	Livery	Image
No. 5541	GWR 4575 Class 2-6-2T	Stored awaiting overhaul. Built in 1928 and owned by the Dean Forest Locomotive Group. Boiler ticket expired end of December 2024.	BR lined Green with late crest	
NCB No. 3880/WD 152 "Rennes"	Austerity 0-6-0ST	Operational; Built in 1944.	LMR Blue	
No. 2221	Andrew Barclay 0-4-0ST	Under Overhaul. Built in 1946.	N/A	
No. 9681	BR(W) 0-6-0PT GWR 5700 Class	Operational; completed its overhaul in November 2022. Built in 1949 and owned by the Dean Forest Locomotive Group.	BR Black with late crest)	
No. 9682	BR(W) 0-6-0PT GWR 5700 Class	Under overhaul. Bought by the Dean Forest Locomotive Group in late 2018, having been partially overhauled under previous owners; the GWR Preservation Group Ltd. Built in 1949, 9682 was the 100th locomotive to leave Barry Scrapyard.	BR Black	
No. 2147 "Uskmouth 1"	Peckett and Sons 0-4-0ST	Operational. Built in 1952 and bought by the DFR, in 1971. DFR's first loco.	Light Green	
No. 3806 "Wilbert"	Austerity 0-6-0ST	Stored; located at Norchard. Built in 1953 and arrived in 1973. Named after Rev. W. Awdry in 1987. Formerly G.B Keeling.	Dark Blue with Red Lining	
No. 3823 "Warrior"	Austerity 0-6-0ST	Stored; located at Lydney Junction. Built in 1954.	NCB Red	
NCB No. 3889/NCB 65	Austerity 0-6-0ST	Under Overhaul. Built in 1964.	Departmental Yellow	
No 2411 (Gloria)	Hunslet 50550 Class 0-6-0ST	Stored at Lydney Junction. Built in 1941.		
No 2413 Gunby	Hunslet 50550 Class 0-6-0ST	Under overhaul. Built in 1941.	Lined Black	

=== Diesel and electric ===
Number & Name	Description	Current Status	Livery	Year	Image
No. 4210127	Fowler 0-4-0DM Diesel Shunter	Stored awaiting overhaul.	N/A		
No. 5622 "Don Corbett"	Hunslet 0-4-0 Diesel Shunter	Out of service, awaiting repairs.	Departmental Yellow with Wasp-Stripe bufferbeams		
No. 6688 "Salty"	Hunslet 0-4-0 Diesel Shunter	Operational. Arrived from the Barry Island Railway in January 2009.	Red with Yellow ends and Wasp-Stripes	1968	
No. 08769 (D3937)	BR 0-6-0DE Class 08	Operational. Re-entered service in 2013.	BR Blue with wasp stripes	1960	
No. D9521	BR 0-6-0 Class 14	Operational.	BR Blue	1964	
No. D9555	BR 0-6-0 Class 14	Under Overhaul; currently at the Midland Railway – Butterley, awaiting repairs.	BR Green	1965	
E6003 ( 73003) 'Sir Herbert Walker'	British Rail Class 73	Operational. Visited the DFR for the 2024 Diesel Gala, and took up permanent residency in 2026.	BR Green	1962	
No. E50619	BR Class 108 DMBS	Operational	BR Green	1958	
No. M51566	BR Class 108 DMCL	Operational	BR Green	1959	
No. M51914	BR Class 108 DMBS	Operational	BR Green	1961	
No. M56492	BR Class 108 DTCL	Operational	BR Green	1960	
No. M59387	BR Class 108 TSL	Operational	BR Green	1958	

=== Former steam locomotives ===
Number & Name	Description	Current Status	Livery	Image
No. 1450	GWR 0-4-2T 1400 Class	Operational at the Severn Valley Railway. Built in 1935. Was resident from 2004 until early 2014.	GWR green (as pictured)	
No. 9642	BR(W) 0-6-0PT 5700 Class	Undergoing overhaul. Resident from 1998 to 2004 when owned by the South Wales Pannier Group. Sold to a private individual and moved to the Gloucestershire Warwickshire Railway in 2005. Built in 1946	BR Black (Early Emblem)	
No. 813	GWR Port Talbot Railway 0-6-0ST	Stored awaiting repairs. Now at the Severn Valley Railway. Built in 1901. Was on hire for the 2004 season.	GWR Green 1929–34 Livery	
No. 5521	GWR 2-6-2T 4575 Class	Operational at the Gwili Railway. Built in 1928. Had running in tests during early 2007, before spells on the railway between 2010 and 2012, before returning briefly in October 2016 appearing as L150.	London Transport Maroon, running as number L.150.	
No. 5538	GWR 2-6-2T 4575 Class	Under overhaul at the Flour Mill. Built in 1928.		
No. 4953 "Pitchford Hall"	GWR 4900 Class	Operational. Spent its early years of Preservation at the DFR. Now at the Epping Ongar Railway. Built in 1929	BR Lined Black (Early Emblem)	
No. 4150	GWR 2-6-2T 5101 Class	Restoration in progress at the Severn Valley Railway. Spent its early years of Preservation at the DFR 1974 – 1977. Built in 1947.	BR Green	
28	Taff Vale Railway O1 class	Restoration in progress at the Gwili Railway. Was at the DFR in 1990s Built in 1897.	GWR Green	
GWR 7800 Class 7812 'Erlestoke Manor'	GWR 7800 Class	Owned by the Erlestoke Manor Fund and came back into steam in early 2023 and currently out on loan as of 2024, based at the Severn Valley Railway. Spend its early years of Preservation at the DFR. Built in 1939	BR Green	

=== Former diesel locomotives and multiple units ===
Number and name	Description	Current status	Livery	Image
No. 2145	Hunslet 0-4-0DM Diesel Shunter	Moved to Tanat Valley Light Railway	Green	
No. 3947 "Planet" (Formerly "Pluto")	Hibberd 0-4-0DM Shunter	Moved to the Vale of Berkeley Railway in 2022	Green	
No. 08238 (13308 / D3308) "Charlie"	BR 0-6-0DE Class 08	moved to NYMR	BR Blue with Wasp Stripes	
No. 08473	BR Class 08	Scrapped, Spares for 08734.But the chassis, cab, wheels and radiator still remain under tarpaulin.	BR Blue	
No. 08734	BR Class 08	Undergoing Restoration.	BR Blue	
No. D7633	BR Bo-Bo Class 25	Sold; awaiting overhaul; leaking header tank	BR Two-Tone Green	
No. 31466	BR A1A-A1A Class 31	Sold now on the North Yorkshire Moors Railway	EWS Maroon/Gold	
No. 37263	BR Co-Co Class 37	Moved to the Telford Steam Railway	BR Departmental Grey livery	
No. 37308	BR Co-Co Class 37	Moved to the Severn Valley Railway	BR Blue	
No. 47524	BR Co-Co Class 47	Scrapped	Rail Express Systems	
No. 73001	BR Bo-Bo Class 73	Sold; Operational	BR Blue	
No. 73002	BR Bo-Bo Class 73	Sold; parts donor	BR Large Logo Blue	
No.W50632	BR Class 108 DMCL	Scrapped for parts	BR Blue & Grey	
No.W52044	BR Class 108 DMCL	Scrapped for parts	BR Blue & Grey	
No. 1499	BR(W) British Rail Class 421	Scrapped 2012.	South West Trains	

== Coaches ==
The main running set is a mix of BR Mark 1 and 2 stock. Two Mark 2 carriages were purchased by the DFR Society in 2018 so that the Mark 1s could be overhauled. In early 2020, all the Mark 1 and 2s were transferred ownership from the Forest of Dean Railway limited company to the DFR society, including XP64 number 4729. In 2025 Mark 1 SO w4786 hired in from the Churnet Valley Railway

=== Great Western Railway coaching stock ===
Design	Type	Number	Status	Livery	Notes	image
Collett Standard	TK	5813	Static sale coach	Chocolate and Cream	Built in 1934 Used as sales coach to raise funds for DFLG	
Collett Standard	TK	5863	Stored	Chocolate and Cream	Built in 1934 Formerly Used as volunteer accommodation coach	
Collett Standard	BCK	7362	awaiting overhaul	None	Built in 1941. Restoration due to start when overhaul of loco 9682 is completed.	
Hawksworth (but to Collet Standard outline)	Inspection Saloon	W80943	Operational	Chocolate and Cream	Built in 1948	

=== British Railways coaching stock ===
Design	Type	Number	Status	Livery	Notes
BR XP64	TSO	4729	Stored	Chocolate and Cream	A grant is being sought to restore 4729 to service.
BR Mk1	TSO	4862	Under Overhaul	Maroon (upon completion)	In the shed at Norchard
BR Mk1	TSO	4891	Stored	Chocolate and Cream	
BR Mk1	TSO	4980	Operational	Maroon	
BR Mk1	TSO	4923	Operational	Maroon	Was overhauled at Williton on WSR in 2021.
BR Mk1	SO	4786	Operational	Maroon	On hire from Churnet Valley Railway.
BR Mk1	CK	15984	Stored	Carmine and Cream	Purchased from Colne Valley Railway in 2022
BR Mk1	BSOT	9003	Operational	Maroon	
BR Mk1	BCK	21129	Stored	Chocolate and Cream	
BR Mk1	BCK	21267	To be accommodation	Maroon	To be used for volunteer accommodation initially with a view to possible passenger service in the medium term
BR Mk1	BSK	34742	Operational	Maroon	Entered traffic for the first time in preservation in December 2018.
BR Mk1	RMB	1803	Stored	Chocolate and Cream	
BR Mk1	BG	80654	Static	Maroon	Used as part of cafe kitchen at Norchard.
BR Mk2	TSO	5175	Operational	Maroon	Arrived at the DFR in November 2018.
BR Mk2a	TSO	5341	Operational	Maroon	Arrived at the DFR in July 2019. Dual Braked.

=== Ex coaching stock ===
Design	Type	Number	Notes	Image
Collett Standard	Autotrailer Third	178	moved to the Severn Valley Railway.	
Hawksworth	Autotrailer Third	238	moved to the Severn Valley Railway.	
Collett Standard	BCK	1645	moved to the South Devon Railway.	
Collett Standard	TK	5848	scrapped	
BR Mk1	BCK	21247	scrapped	
BR Mk1	SK	25602	scrapped	
BR Mk1	RMB	1829	moved to the East Lancashire Railway.	
BR Mk1	RBR	1665	moved to the East Lancashire Railway.	
BR Mk1	BG	81380	moved to the West Somerset Railway.	
BR XP64	SK	25509	scrapped Dec 2007.	
BR XP64	FK	13407	scrapped Jan 2013.	

Coach type codes

- BCK – Brake Composite Corridor
- BSK – Brake Standard Corridor
- BSOT – Brake Standard Open (Micro-Buffet)
- RMB – Restaurant Miniature Buffet
- CK – Composite Corridor
- SK – Standard Corridor
- TK – Standard Corridor
- SO – Standard Open
- TSO – Tourist Standard Open
- BG – Brake Gangwayed

== Wagons ==
There are lots different types of wagons at the DFR. Some are used for display and other for engineering works. Many of the wagons can be seen in sidings along the line. There are rakes of Dogfish ballast wagons, VEA Vans and TTA tank wagons.

=== Brakevans ===
Design	Type	Number	Status	Livery	Notes	Image
SR 25 Ton	Queen Mary Brake	56303	Operational	BR Brown	Dual Braked	
BR 20 Ton	Standard Brake	955224	Under repairs	BR Brown	Moved to same location where 732268 was restored in June 2025	
LMS 20 Ton	Standard Brake	732268	Operational	BR Brown	Was restored offsite, returned December 2024	
LMS 20 Ton	Standard Brake	732400	awaiting repairs	BR Brown		
BR 20 Ton	Shark Brake	DB993901	Operational	BR Black	Vacuum Braked	
BR 20 Ton	Shark Brake	DB993916	Under repairs	BR Dutch	Piped for air. Moved to same location where 732268 was restored in December 2024.	
GWR 20 Ton	Toad Brake	W68480	Operational	BR Grey		
GWR 20 Ton	Toad Brake	17488	Under repairs	GWR Grey	Purchased from the GWR Preservation Group alongside Pannier 9682, arrived April 2019. Vacuum Braked	
