= Whitehill, Staffordshire =

Suburb of Kidsgrove in Staffordshire, England

Coordinates: 53.090597°N 2.226218°W

Whitehill or White Hill
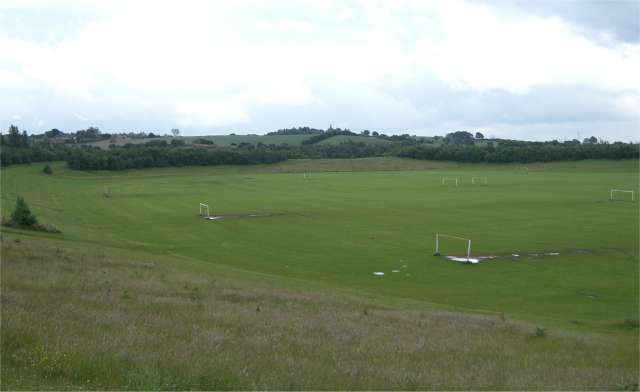
- Birchenwood Country Park in Whitehill, Kidsgrove

- Location within Staffordshire
- OS grid reference: SJ849548
- Civil parish: Kidsgrove
- District: Borough of Newcastle-under-Lyme
- Shire county: Staffordshire
- Region: West Midlands
- Country: England
- Sovereign state: United Kingdom
- Post town: STOKE-ON-TRENT
- Postcode district: ST7
- Police: Staffordshire
- Fire: Staffordshire
- Ambulance: West Midlands
- UK Parliament: Stoke-on-Trent North

Whitehill, also sometimes spelt as White Hill is a historic village and now a suburb of Kidsgrove in the Borough of Newcastle-under-Lyme in Staffordshire, England.

== History ==
Until the arrival of the industrial revolution, Whitehill was a small rural hamlet. However, when the industrial revolution happened and this saw opening of the "Whitney Colorado Mine" in the village.

There was also a hospital opened by the Red Cross, which opened in the years of World War I and was operated by the Daughters of Charity of Saint Vincent de Paul. This hospital continued to be run and operated by the charity until its closure in 1998.

Today, Whitehill is a large urban area of Kidsgrove and forms it with neighbouring suburbs including Dove Bank, Kidsgrove and The Rookery. There was also a Methodist church in Whitehill, although this has since been demolished.

== Amenities ==
The area is close to Kidsgrove town centre for its local amenities. Despite Birchenwood Country Park, Dove Bank Primary School and Mount Road Practice being in the area.

== Transport ==
There are regular bus services between Stoke-on-Trent, Kidsgrove and Biddulph that pass through the area.

The nearest rail station is in Kidsgrove.
