= Lydney Town railway station =

Former railway station in England

Lydney Town
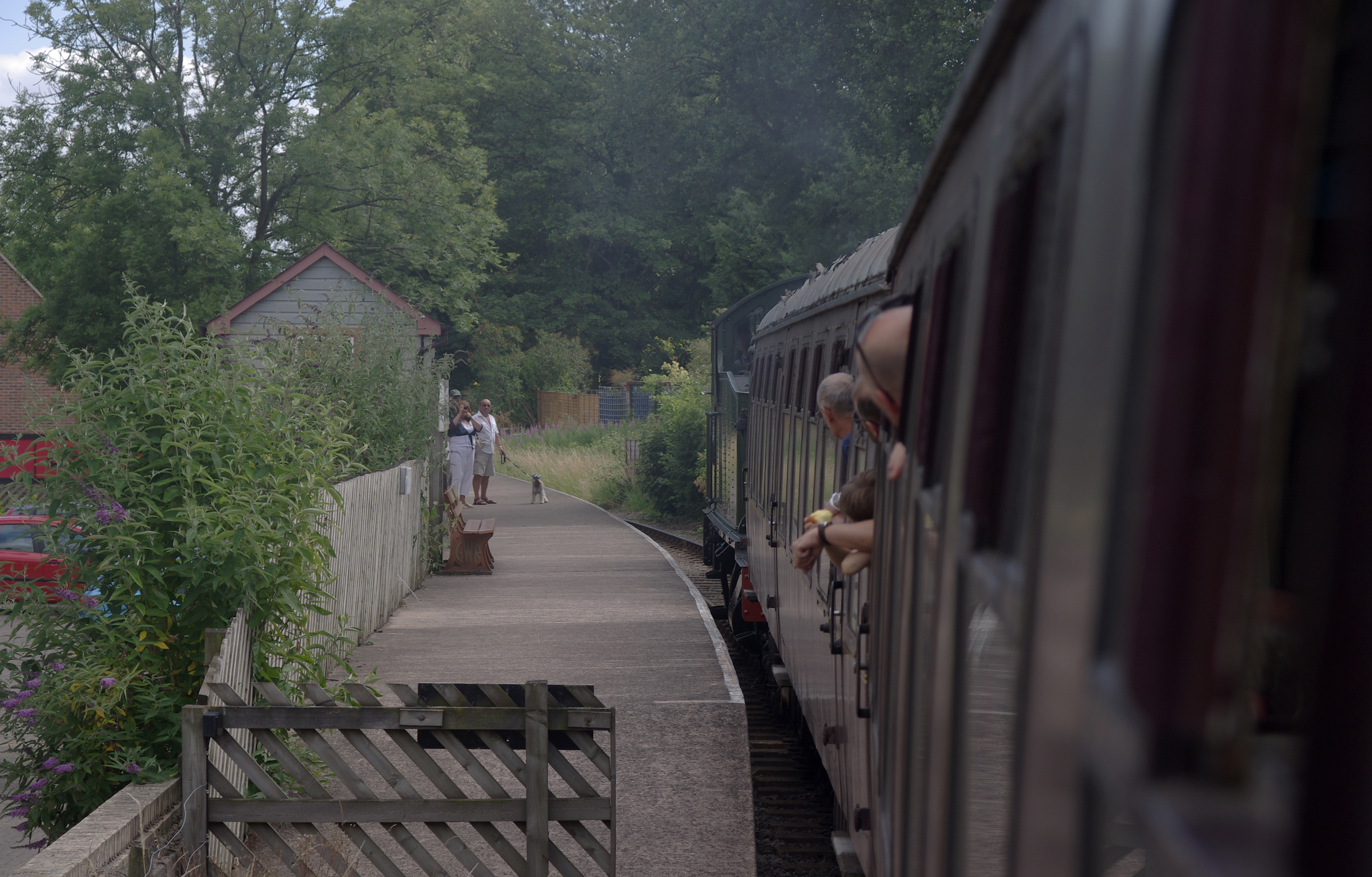

General information
- Location: Lydney, Forest of Dean; England
- Coordinates: 51.72578°N 2.53214°W
- Grid reference: SO633031
- System: Station on heritage railway
- Operator: Dean Forest Railway
- Platforms: 1

History
- Original company: Severn and Wye Railway

Key dates
- 23 September 1875: opened
- 26 October 1960: passenger service suspended
- November 1964: officially closed
- 22 April 2001: reopened
Location

Lydney Town railway station is a railway station on the Dean Forest Railway in Lydney in Gloucestershire.

== History ==
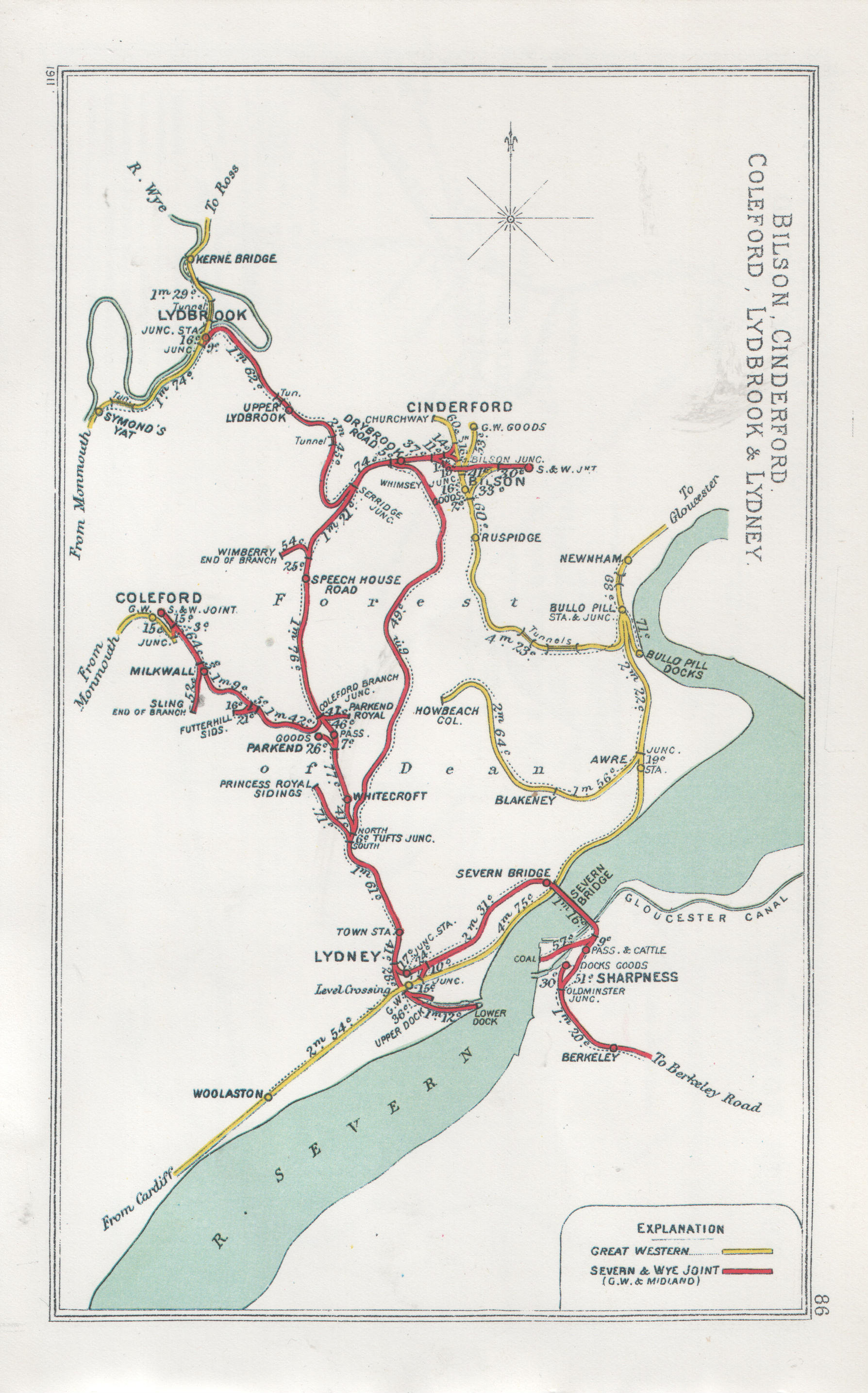
A 1911 RCH map of railways in the vicinity of Lydney Town

The station which is situated in the centre of Lydney opened with rather basic facilities on 23 September 1875, these facilities were later upgraded in 1897.

The station is located at 8 miles 75 chains from Berkeley Road, located at exactly 1 chain to the north of the station is the High Street level crossing (officially called "Lydney Town Crossing").

The station's proximity to the main road through Lydney proved to be a problem throughout the station's life as shunting in the nearby yard and in the station caused delays to road and foot traffic.

A footbridge was constructed in 1904 in order to reduce the delays to foot traffic.

The metal supports for the footbridge and the old platform foundations can still be carefully made out in the undergrowth on the East side of the line between the new platform and the level crossing.

All passenger services north of Lydney Town ceased in 1929. The passenger services from Lydney Town to Berkeley Road survived until the destruction of the Severn Railway Bridge in October 1960 when passenger services were suspended. The station was officially closed in November 1964.

The Dean Forest Railway started operating services over Lydney Town Crossing and past the site of the former Lydney Town Station to St Mary's Halt (which was then known as Lydney Lakeside) in 1991.

Lydney Town Station was then rebuilt (on a re-aligned track profile due to the amount of urban development and the widening of the High Street) and subsequently reopened on 22 April 2001.

== Services ==
Preceding station	Heritage railways	Following station
Norchard towards Parkend	Dean Forest Railway	St Mary's Halt towards Lydney Junction
Disused railways
Whitecroft; Station restored	Severn and Wye Railway (Later MR and GWR)	Lydney Junction; Station restored

== See also ==
- Dean Forest Railway
