= Lydney Junction railway station =

Former railway station in England

Lydney Junction
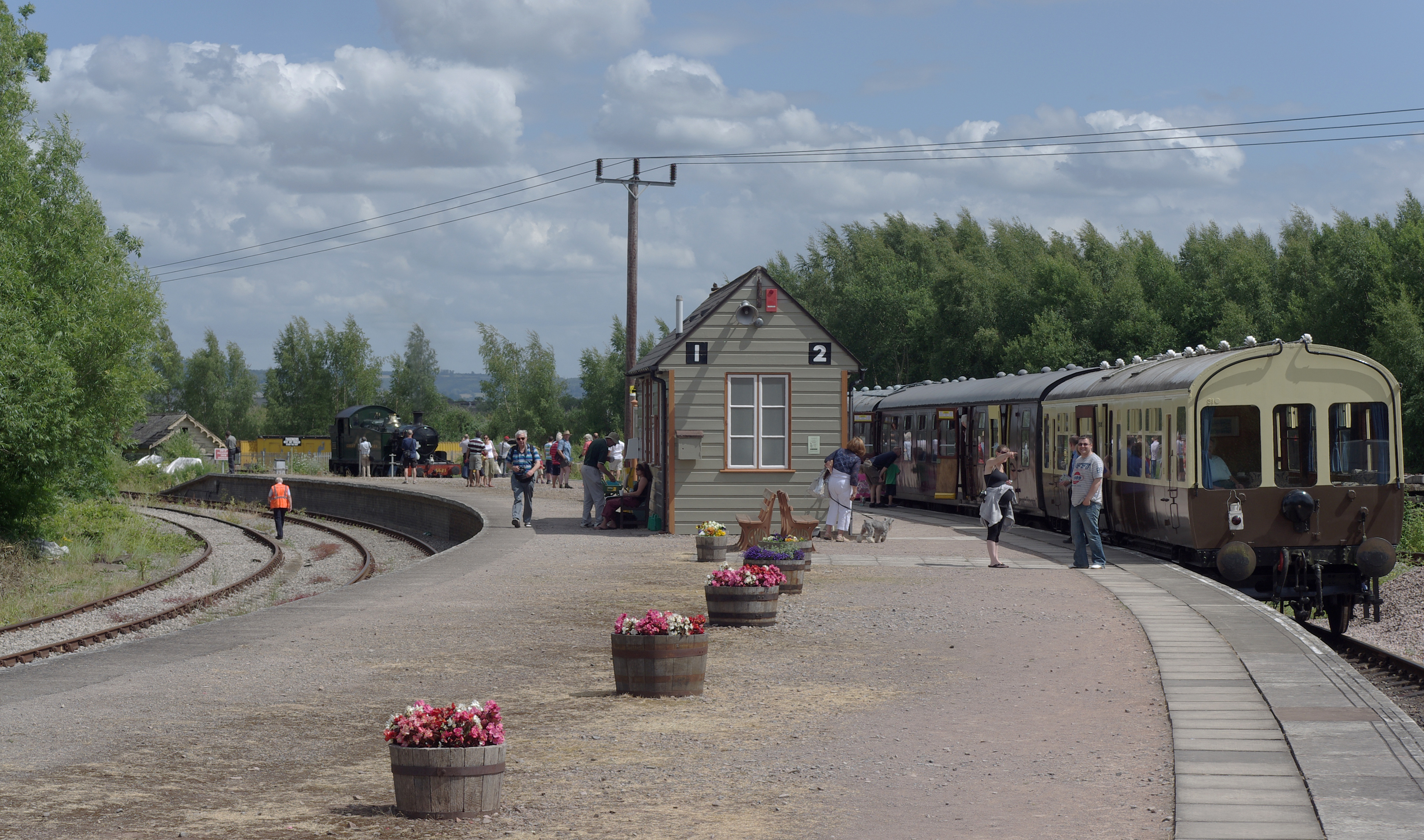

General information
- Location: Lydney, Forest of Dean; England
- Coordinates: 51.71534°N 2.53086°W
- Grid reference: SO633020
- System: Station on heritage railway
- Operator: Dean Forest Railway
- Platforms: 2

History
- Original company: Severn and Wye Railway
Location

Lydney Junction railway station is a railway station near Lydney in Gloucestershire. The station is now the southern terminus of the Dean Forest Railway. It is located to the south of Lydney, near the A48 road.

The diesel department of the preserved line uses Lydney Junction as a base of operations.

== History ==
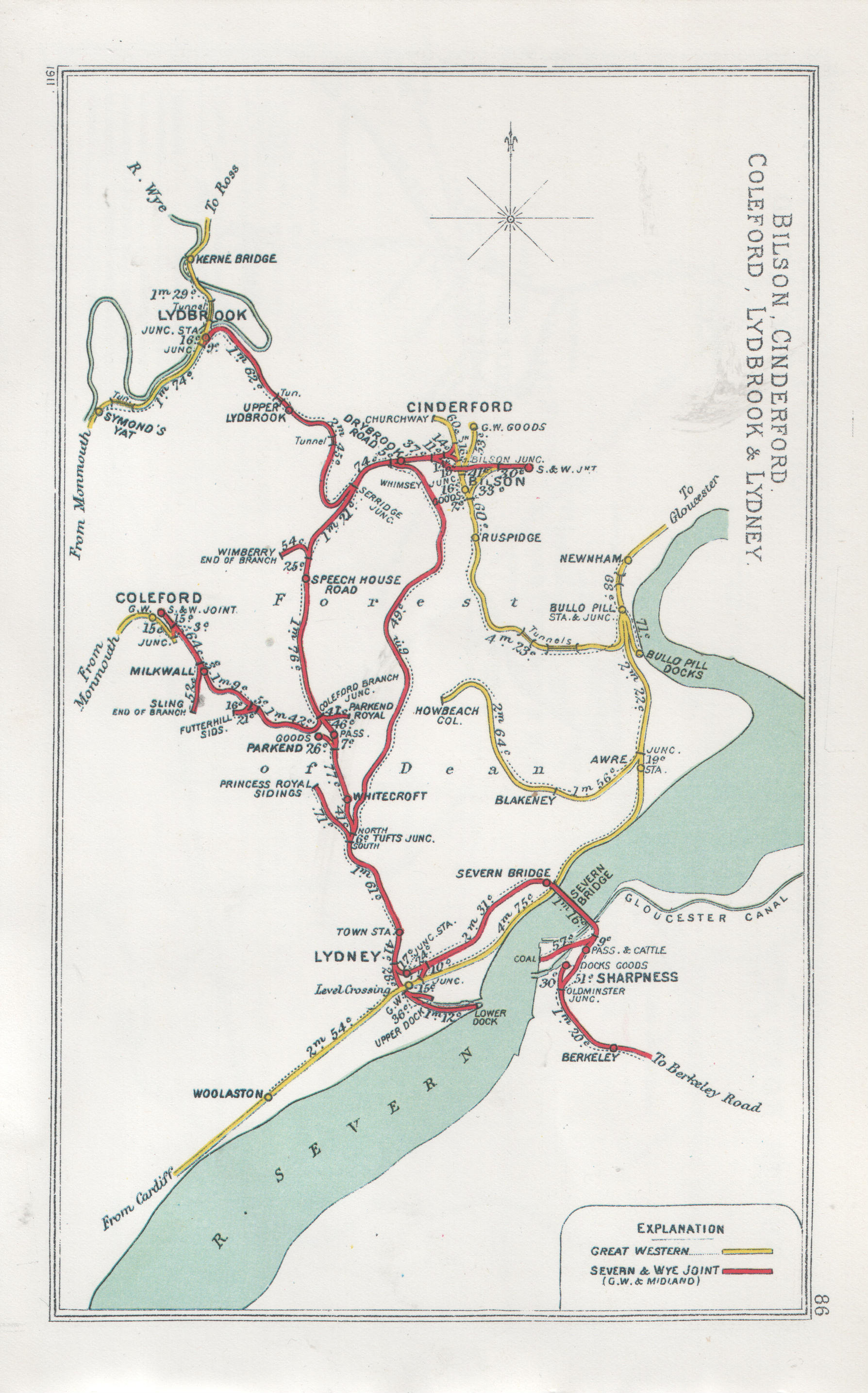
A 1911 Railway Clearing House map of railways in the vicinity of Lydney Junction

Lydney Junction was the name of two separate but adjacent stations on two different railway lines. The Great Western Railway station, which remains open as Lydney railway station, opened in 1851 on the Gloucester to Chepstow section of the South Wales Railway. To the west of this station, the freight-only line of the Severn and Wye Mineral Railway crossed the GWR line on its north–south route taking coal and iron from the Forest of Dean to the docks at Lydney.

In 1875, the Severn and Wye started passenger services and built a new terminus station at Lydney Junction for passenger trains to and from Drybrook, near Cinderford. Four years later, this first station was superseded by a new one as the Severn and Wye joined with the Midland Railway in building the Severn Bridge Railway, which linked Lydney across the river Severn with the Midland's Sharpness Branch Line, enabling access for the Forest of Dean minerals to the new and more extensive docks at Sharpness.

The new Lydney Junction (Severn and Wye) station was linked by a long footbridge to the GWR's station. It was built on a curve which took the line away to the east from the north–south line of the original freight railway, and there were extensive freight yards, which provided the only rail link between the Severn and Wye and the Great Western lines. The two stations worked closely together, particularly after 1894, when the Severn and Wye Railway was bought by the Great Western and the Midland. Finally, in 1955, under British Railways, the two stations were formally merged into one.

Lydney Junction (Severn and Wye) was used as a through-station for passenger services to and from Berkeley Road railway station and over the Severn Railway Bridge. These services either terminated at Lydney Town railway station, which was in the centre of Lydney, or continued on northwards into the Forest of Dean to terminate at Lydbrook Junction on the Ross to Monmouth line. These services ceased abruptly in October 1960 when the Severn Railway Bridge was damaged beyond economic repair in a shipping accident. Passenger services were officially withdrawn in November 1964.

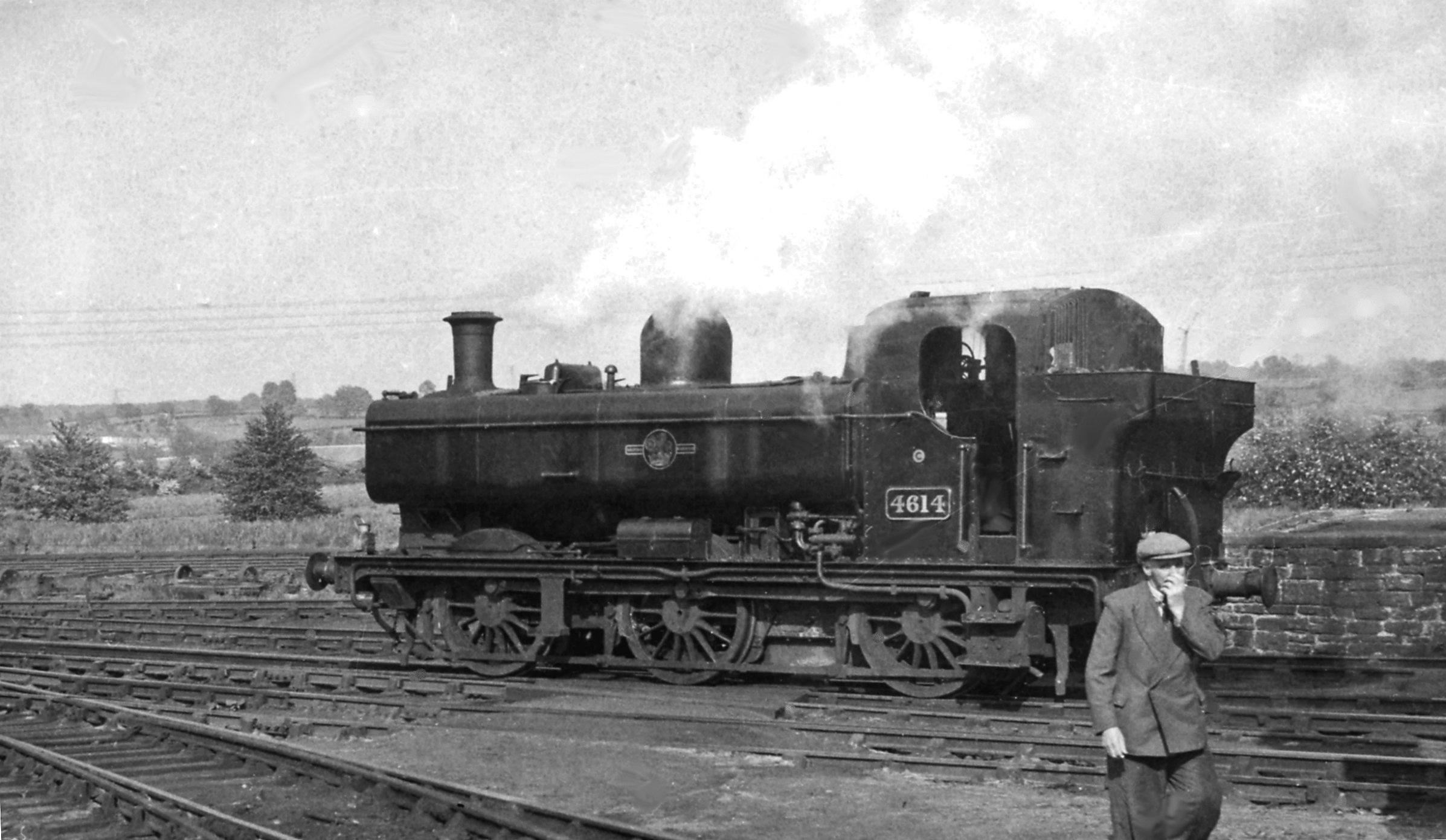
Lydney Locomotive Depot in 1962

== Revival ==
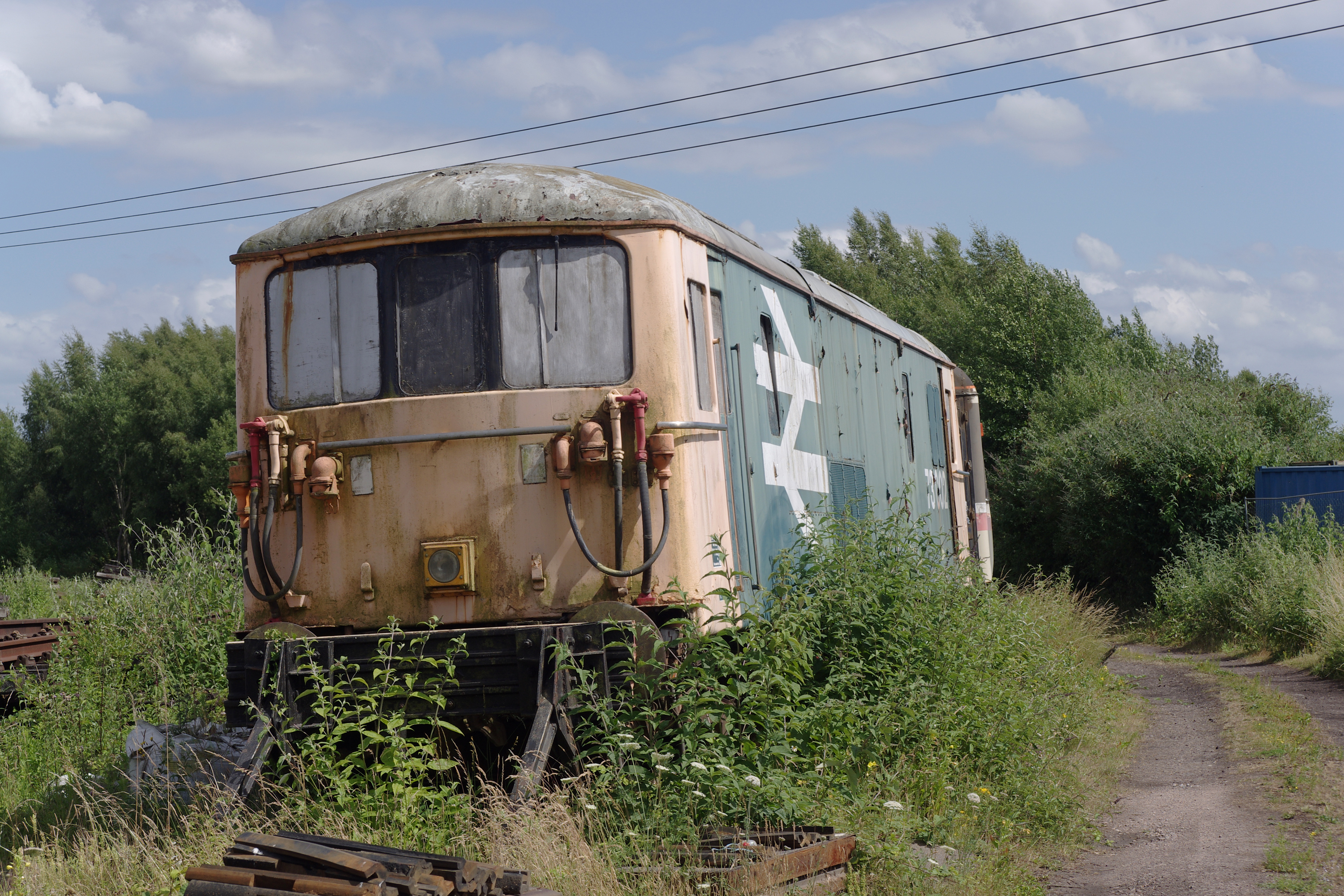
73002 sits on static display at the station.

After closure, the up platform and the station building were demolished. The down platform survived and forms the basis of the new Lydney Junction station on the heritage Dean Forest Railway. The station was reopened in 1995 when a signal box was opened to supervise a level crossing - the flat-roofed BR timber structure came originally from Heysham Port station in Lancashire. A row of locomotives, including 73002 and 08734, is on static display.

== Services ==
Preceding station	Heritage railways	Following station
St Mary's Halt towards Parkend	Dean Forest Railway	Terminus
Disused railways
Lydney Town; Station restored	Severn Bridge Railway; Severn and Wye Railway, later MR and GWR	Severn Bridge; Station closed
National Rail
Interchange with Lydney on the Gloucester–Newport line
