= Parkend railway station =

Heritage railway station in England

Parkend station
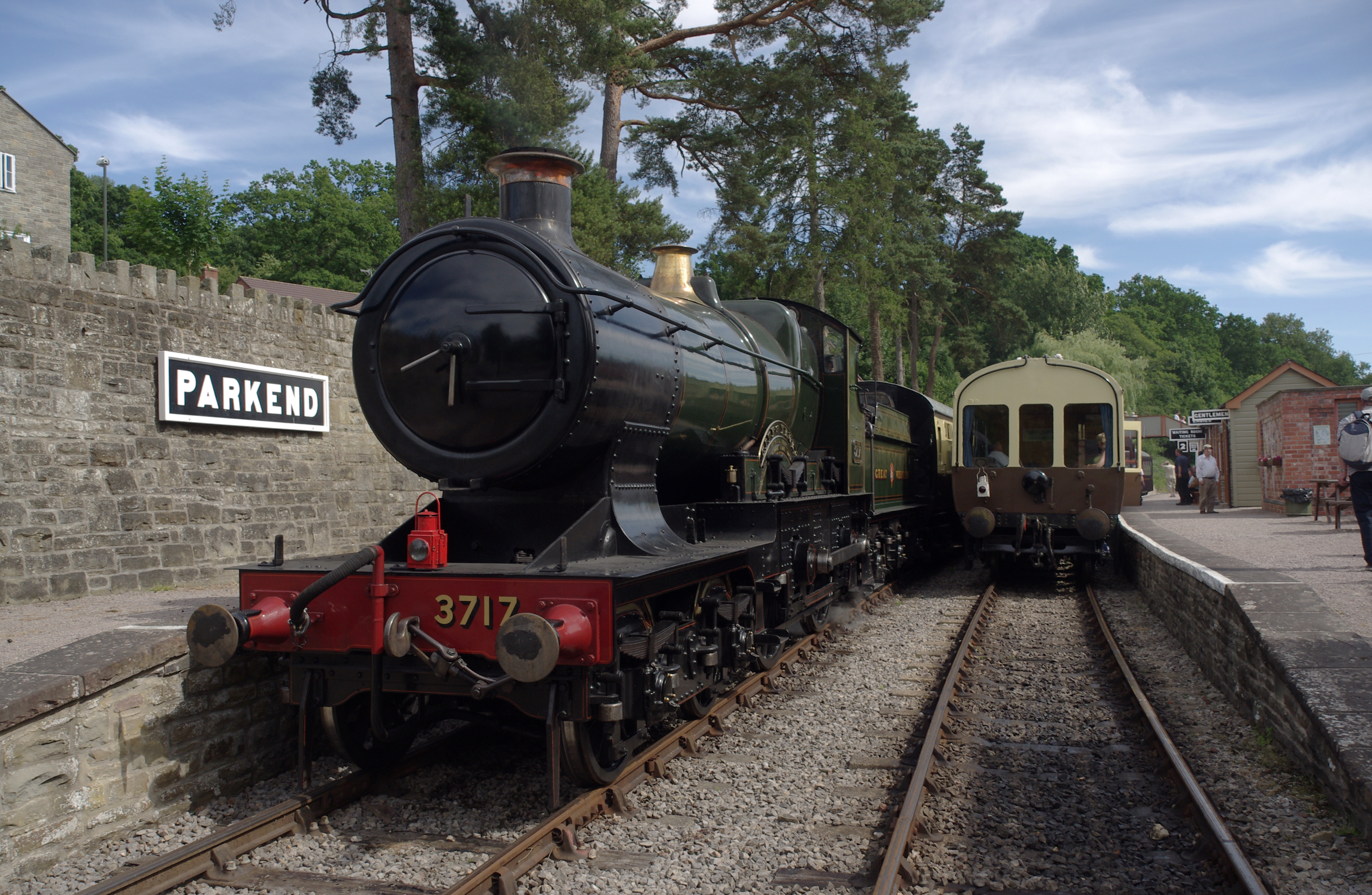
- "City of Truro" stands at Parkend in 2010

General information
- Location: Parkend, Forest of Dean; England
- Coordinates: 51.76756°N 2.55647°W
- Grid reference: SO617078
- System: Station on heritage railway
- Operator: Dean Forest Railway
- Platforms: 2

History
- Original company: Severn and Wye Railway

Key dates
- 23 September 1875: opened
- 8 July 1929: closed for passengers
- 19 May 2006: reopened
Location

Parkend railway station is located in the village of Parkend, in the Forest of Dean, Gloucestershire. It is currently the northern terminus of the Dean Forest (heritage) Railway.

== History ==
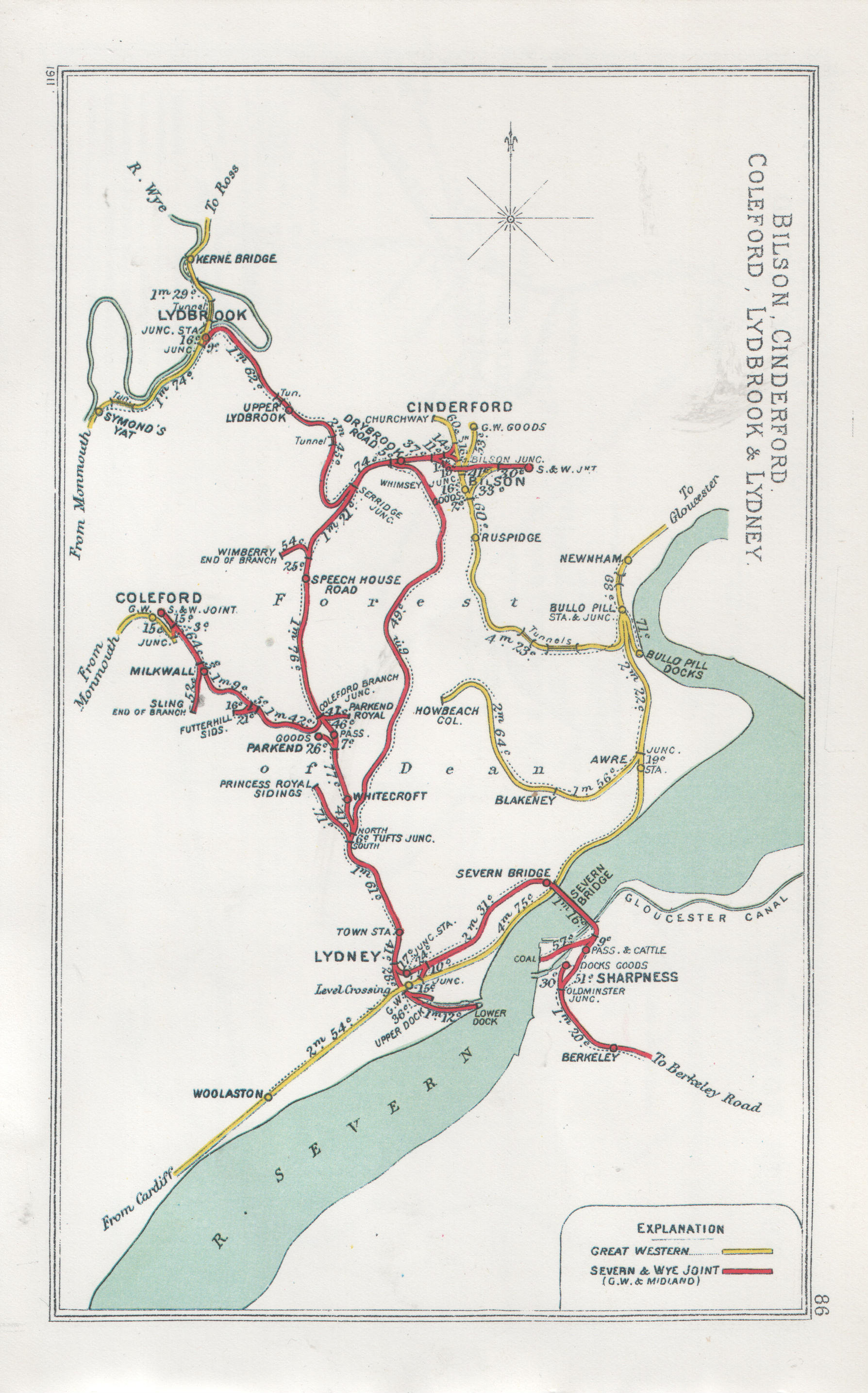
A 1911 Railway Clearing House map of railways in the vicinity of Parkend

In 1864 the Severn and Wye Railway began operating small mineral trains on its existing tramroad, but they were not satisfactory and, in 1868, the company added a broad-gauge steam railway line. However, both were removed and replaced with standard gauge tracks by 1874. The station was constructed in 1873, and subsequently opened in 1875, to enable the company to also offer passenger services alongside its freight operations which, by now, had given the railway a sizeable presence in the village, including several sidings.

A decline in mineral traffic and passenger numbers saw regular passenger services cease in 1929. The last goods train left Parkend on 26 March 1976 and much of the track was dismantled.

The line was bought by the Dean Forest Railway Preservation Society, now based at Norchard. In 2004-2005 Parkend station was extensively reconstructed, and it reopened 26 December 2005. Diesel Railcars ran the service in December 2005 and then Steam services have run into Parkend since 25 March 2006. It was then officially opened, by the Princess Royal, on 19 May 2006.

The station has two platforms, a water column, footbridge, goods shed, level crossing and a signal box (ex Maesmawr). On the 'Down' Platform there is the main station building which has a ticket office and also sells some food & drink along with some gifts. Toilets are also part of this building. The level crossing gates at the north end of the station are reputedly the longest in Britain.

== Services ==
An extension to Beechenhurst is currently planned.

| Preceding station | Heritage railways | Following station |
|---|---|---|
| Terminus | Dean Forest Railway | Whitecroft towards Lydney Junction |
Proposed extension
| Beechenhurst towards Cinderford | Dean Forest Railway | Whitecroft towards Lydney Junction |
Disused railways
| Milkwall | Severn and Wye Railway; Later Severn and Wye Joint Railway (MR and GWR) | Whitecroft |

== See also ==
- Dean Forest Railway
- Severn and Wye Railway
