= Bream, Gloucestershire =

Village in Gloucestershire, England

Coordinates: 51.7498°N 2.5740°W

Bream
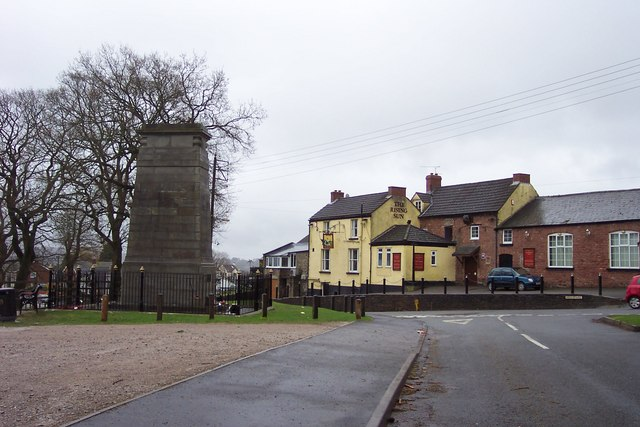

- Location within Gloucestershire
- Population: 4,812
- OS grid reference: SO604059
- Civil parish: West Dean
- District: Forest of Dean
- Ceremonial county: Gloucestershire
- Region: South West
- Country: England
- Sovereign state: United Kingdom
- Post town: LYDNEY
- Postcode district: GL15
- Dialling code: 01594
- Police: Gloucestershire
- Fire: Gloucestershire
- Ambulance: South Western
- UK Parliament: Forest of Dean

Bream (historically known as Breem) is a village in the Forest of Dean, west Gloucestershire, England. The village is located near the Lyd river and within the Forest of Dean coalfield. In 2025, the population was approximately 4,812.

== Governance ==
Bream is a part of the Forest of Dean constituency for General Elections. The current MP is Matt Bishop, who was elected when the seat was won by Labour Party from the Conservative Party in the 2024 General Election.

Bream is located in the Blakely and Bream ward for Gloucestershire County Council elections. The current councillor is Beki Hoyland (Green) who won 1,501 votes (40%) in the 2025 local election.

Simon Wendland (Reform UK) came second, having won 1,177 votes (31.4%) and Richard Thomas (Conservative) came third, with 611 votes (16.3%).

== History ==
=== Early History ===
Human activity at Bream dates back to the Iron Age, when iron ore was being mined in the local area. Mining expanded once the Romans brought improved excavation techniques and smelting.

The village itself is said to have initially emerged as a clearing in the Royal Forest used for hunting for deer and boar by King John when he resided at St Briavel's Castle.

The first dwellings in Bream were recorded in 1452. In 1505, the St. James' church, Bream or St. James chapel as it was then known, was built. The first house at Maypole was recorded to have been built in 1637, and would later become the New Inn. In 1712, the population of Bream was 300. Later, in 1822, the church was restored and expanded.

=== Dean Forest Riots ===
Bream was central to the Dean Forest Riots over the Dean and New Forests Act of 1808, which sought to enclose large amounts of the forest in response to a shortage of naval timer. This would have limited ancient freeminer and grazing rights in the area. Warren James, who lived in Bream from 1812, led the opposition. The riots culminated in the tearing down of enclosing fences but was ultimately suppressed by heavily armed soldiers from Doncaster and 180 infantry later Plymouth.

James was sentenced to death for his involvement in the riots however this was later altered to expulsion to Australia. Following a petition from foresters back in Dean, James was officially pardoned but chose to remain in Hobart, Tasmania where he died in 1841.

=== Changes in industry ===
The main employment in the village in the past was coal mining, farming, and forestry. Following changes to industry, the last mine in Bream, the 'Princess Royal' was closed in 1962.

Employment in the village has significantly changed since the closure of the mines however the village still has 17.2% employed in skilled trade occupations compared to the national average of 10.2%. The percentage whose highest educational qualification is an apprenticeship (8.0%) is also above the national average of 5.3%.

Bream is one of the largest villages in the Forest of Dean District with a population of just over 4,800 as of January 2024. It is just one of a number of settlements which make up the Forest Ring of settlements on the fringes of the statutory Royal Forest. Positioned on the southern edge of the forest core between the towns of Lydney and Coleford, the village is set on a ridge of high ground, falling away on three sides.

== Sport ==
Bream has a rugby union team (Bream RFC) which plays in the Counties 2 Gloucestershire league. The eighth division of league rugby union in England. The club was founded in 1878 and is one of the oldest in Gloucestershire.

The club moved to its present site in 1960 having previously been based at the nearby Rising Sun. The playing fields were purchased by the club in 1967, although they had been used by the club for many years previously.

Bream Sports Club (a members club based in the village) hosts cricket and association football as well as community events featuring live entertainment, such as 'Bream Summer Show' and 'BreamFest'.

== Education ==
Bream C of E primary school was rated good in all areas in 2024 by Ofsted.

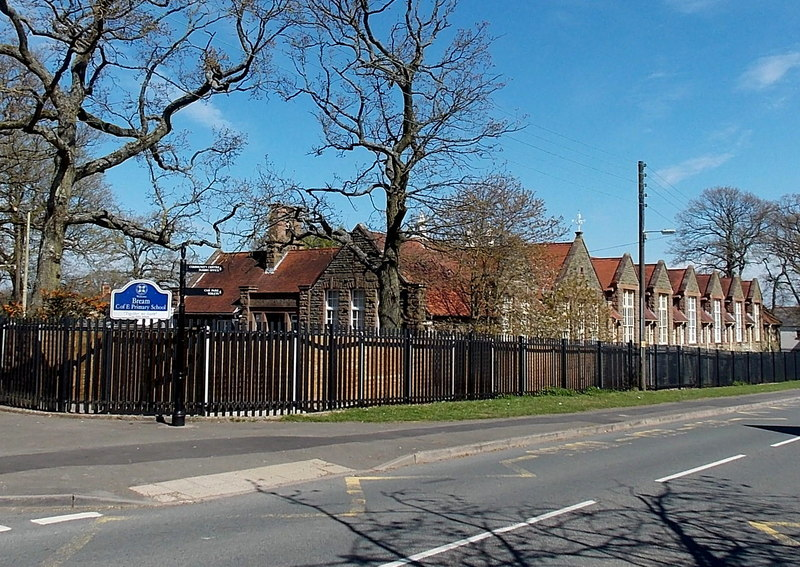
Bream Church of England Primary School

This follows 22 years of not achieving a good judgement and having been rated inadequate in 2019. Bream joined the Severn Federation Academy Trust in 2021, a multi-academy trust consisting six primary schools in Gloucestershire.

Schools local to the area also include Pillowell Community Primary School and Ellwood Community Primary School.

== Transport ==
Bream is located about 4 miles (6.4 km) from the A48 in Lydney which provides road connections to Gloucester in the east and Chepstow to the west.

Bus services into the village mainly serve Lydney, its railway station and bus station, as well as Gloucester.

The Lydney Railway Station on the Gloucester-Newport line serves the village with half-hourly services to Cheltenham Spa and hourly services to Cardiff Central.

== Notable residents ==
- Wayne Barnes (born 1979) - International rugby union referee. Lived in Bream and played for Bream Rugby Club.
- Warren James (1792–1841) - Miners' leader who led the Foresters to action against the Crown, in 1831. Lived in Bream.
- Ron Moore - rugby union (RU) and rugby league (RL) footballer of the 1930s for Bream RFC (RU), Wakefield Trinity, and Bramley lived in Bream.
- William "Billy" Stone - rugby union (RU) and rugby league (RL) footballer of the 1910s, and 1920s for Bream RFC (RU), Great Britain (RL), England, and Hull F.C. lived in Bream.
- Poppy Moffatt, entrepreneur. Lived in Bream.
- Grace Sutherland, entrepreneur. Lived in Bream.
