= Henry Sargant Storer =

British artist and engraver

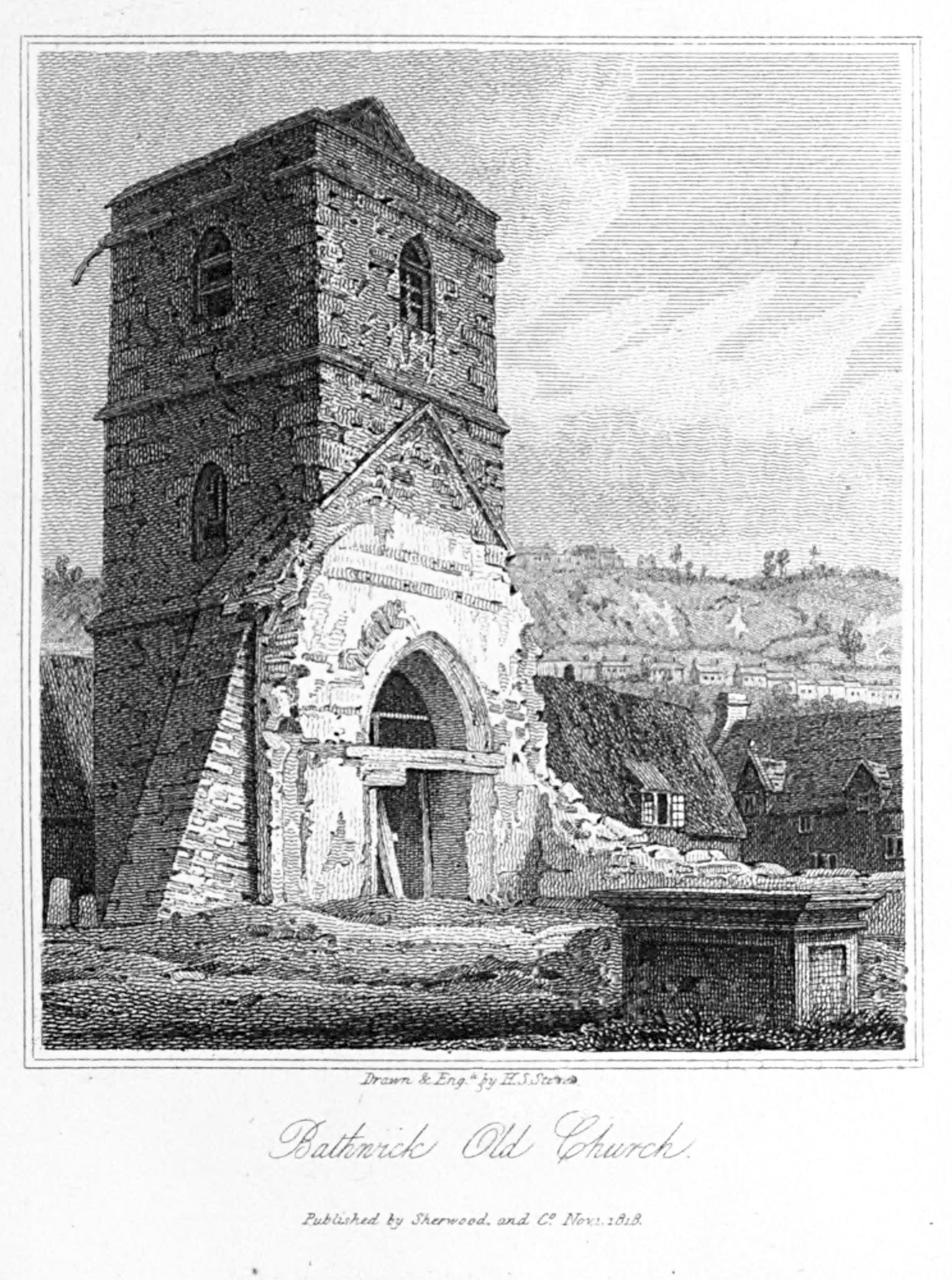
Bathwick Old Church (1818) by Henry Sargant Storer

Henry Sargant Storer (13 February 1796, Clerkenwell – 8 January 1837, London) was a British artist and engraver. He was the son of James Sargant Storer, and exhibited drawings at the Royal Academy from 1814 to 1836.

== List of works ==
- The Cathedrals of Great Britain, 4 vols., 1814–1819
- Delineations of Fountains Abbey, 1820
- Delineations of Trinity College, Cambridge, c. 1820
- Views in Edinburgh and its Vicinity, 1820
- The University and City of Oxford displayed, 1821
- Delineations of Gloucestershire, 1824
- The Portfolio: a collection of Engravings from Antiquarian, Architectural, and Topographical Subjects, 4 vols., 1823–24.
- Thomas Kitson Cromwell's History of Clerkenwell, 1828
- Walks through Islington, 1835
- The plates to Pierce Egan's Walks through Bath, 1819
- A view of Christ's College, Cambridge for the Cambridge Almanack, 1822.
