= St Briavels Castle =

Grade I listed castle in Forest of Dean, United Kingdom

- Gloucestershire, England
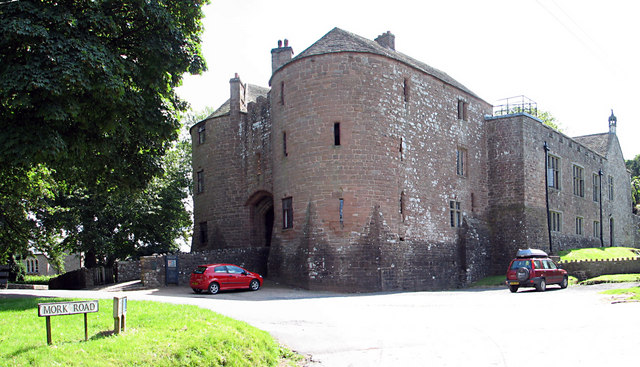
- St Briavels Castle.

Site information
- Type: Bailey
- Owner: English Heritage
- Controlled by: English Heritage
- Condition: Inhabited and used as a Youth Hostel

Location
- Shown within Gloucestershire.
- Location within Gloucestershire
- Coordinates: 51.7380°N 2.6405°W
- Grid reference: grid reference SO5575404632

Site history
- Materials: Old Red Sandstone and Limestone

St Briavels Castle (most likely named after Saint Brioc) is a moated Norman castle at St Briavels in the English county of Gloucestershire. The castle is noted for its huge Edwardian gatehouse that guards the entrance.

St Briavels Castle was originally built between 1075 and 1129 as a royal administrative centre for the Forest of Dean. During the 13th century the castle became first a favourite hunting lodge of King John, and then the primary centre in England for the manufacture of arrows for use with the longbow, the predominant missile weapon of the English in the later medieval period, and quarrels, large numbers of which were required for crossbows in medieval warfare.

The castle was transferred many times between royal favourites in the 14th and 15th centuries and slowly declined in appearance and importance. St Briavels Castle became used primarily as a court and as a notorious debtors' prison, conditions being documented by the prison reformer John Howard in 1775. Following local riots and a parliamentary investigation in the 1830s, reforms in the 19th century brought an end to the castle's use as a prison.

Extensive renovation at the turn of the 20th century allowed St Briavels Castle to be taken over as a Youth Hostel in 1948. It remains in this role today, owned by English Heritage and open to the public. The castle is classed as a Grade I listed building and as a Scheduled Monument.

== Architecture ==
St Briavels Castle is located on a spur dominating a position above the River Wye, on the western edge of the Forest of Dean. The castle is predominantly built of local old red sandstone and limestone. The castle site is surrounded by an in-filled moat; now a garden, the moat was originally wet and fed by a spring underneath the moat itself.

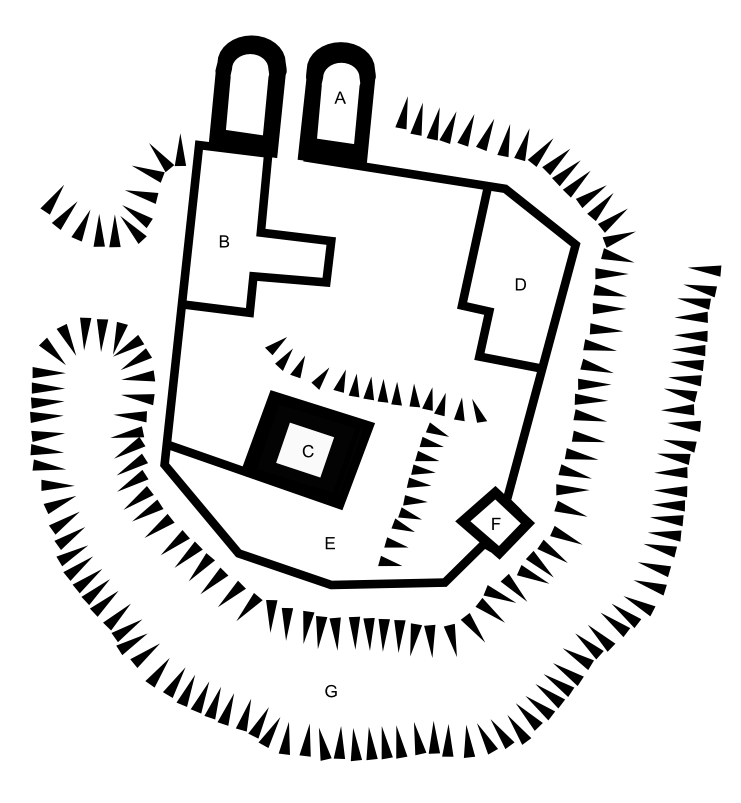
A diagram of St Briavels Castle in the early 14th century. Key: A: gatehouse; B: King's chambers and chapel; C: keep; D: hall range; E: the Peel; F: tower; G: moat.

The castle keep, which collapsed and was demolished in the 18th century, was originally a square Norman design, 15.6 m by 13.9 m (51 ft by 45 ft) in size, built on a motte of clay and stone. Intact, it would have been approximately 20 m (66 ft) tall, and would have resembled the keeps at Goodrich Castle and White Castle, both of a similar period and design in the region.

The keep was protected by the stone curtain wall that still survives today, forming the castle bailey. Its irregular polygonal plan suggests that it was built on the site of an earlier earthwork. It originally had a small round tower protecting the south-east corner and probably a gateway in the south wall alongside the keep. Other demolished buildings included a forge and assorted buildings along the north-east of the bailey. A set of medieval domestic buildings still stand along the north-west side of the bailey, however, including a hall, solar and chapel, originally providing accommodation for the castle constable and the King. These buildings were restored in the 19th century to their current condition. Some features, including the hall range, fireplace and capitals appear to date from the 13th century. The hall and solar form a two-storey building 23 m by 10 m (75 ft by 33 ft) wide, alongside the 14th century chapel, which still incorporates later 17th century adjustments and windows. At one end of the domestic range is the famous "Forester's Horn" chimney, crested with the forest warden's horn, a symbol of Forest Law and the castle's authority. The buildings include a sunken pit prison; graffiti dated 1671 show that it was still in use for that purpose at that time.

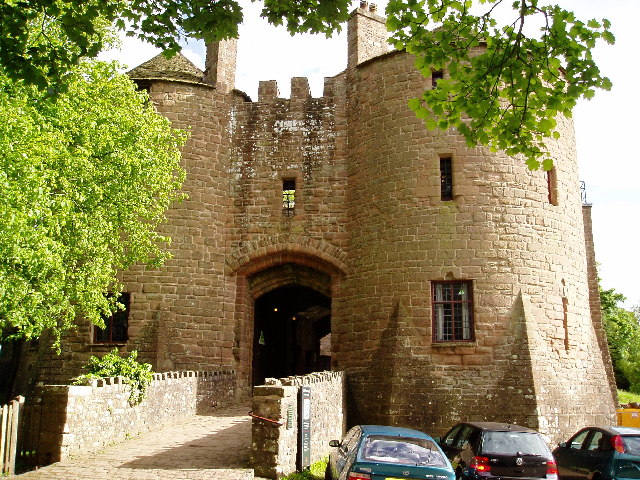
The Edwardian castle gatehouse.

The gatehouse of St Briavels Castle is described in Pevsner's Buildings of England as "magnificent... a very fine example of the royal masons' work of the period." It is a massive structure of two large D-shaped towers flanking a wide gate passage 14.8 m (48 ft) long, and linked above by a large room. This sort of gatehouse is sometimes termed a keep-gatehouse or gatehouse-keep because of the massive size and defences on both the inner and outer sides of the building. The first gatehouse of this sort was built at Caerphilly Castle; other examples exist in North Wales and at Tonbridge Castle. Uniquely, St Briavels' gatehouse is protected with three sets of portcullises – although some gatehouses, such as Harlech and Beaumaris Castle were built for slots for three, they were only installed with two. A notable feature is the existence of smaller portcullises to defend the doorways from the passage to the porters' lodges. The gatehouse was originally taller than it is today and the entrance would also have included a drawbridge, removed during the 20th century.

The base of the gatehouse is defended from undermining by large "spurs". This design feature is characteristic of castles in the Welsh Marches, including Goodrich and Tonbridge Castle, but unlike these castles depends on a solid octagonal, rather than square, based interacting with the form of the circular towers. The gatehouse is well defended, except for the upper windows at the rear; the upper floors were designed for high status guests and these windows would have provided adequate light for the chambers. The south-east of the gatehouse is relatively modern, however, having been rebuilt after a past collapse.

=== 11th and 12th centuries ===
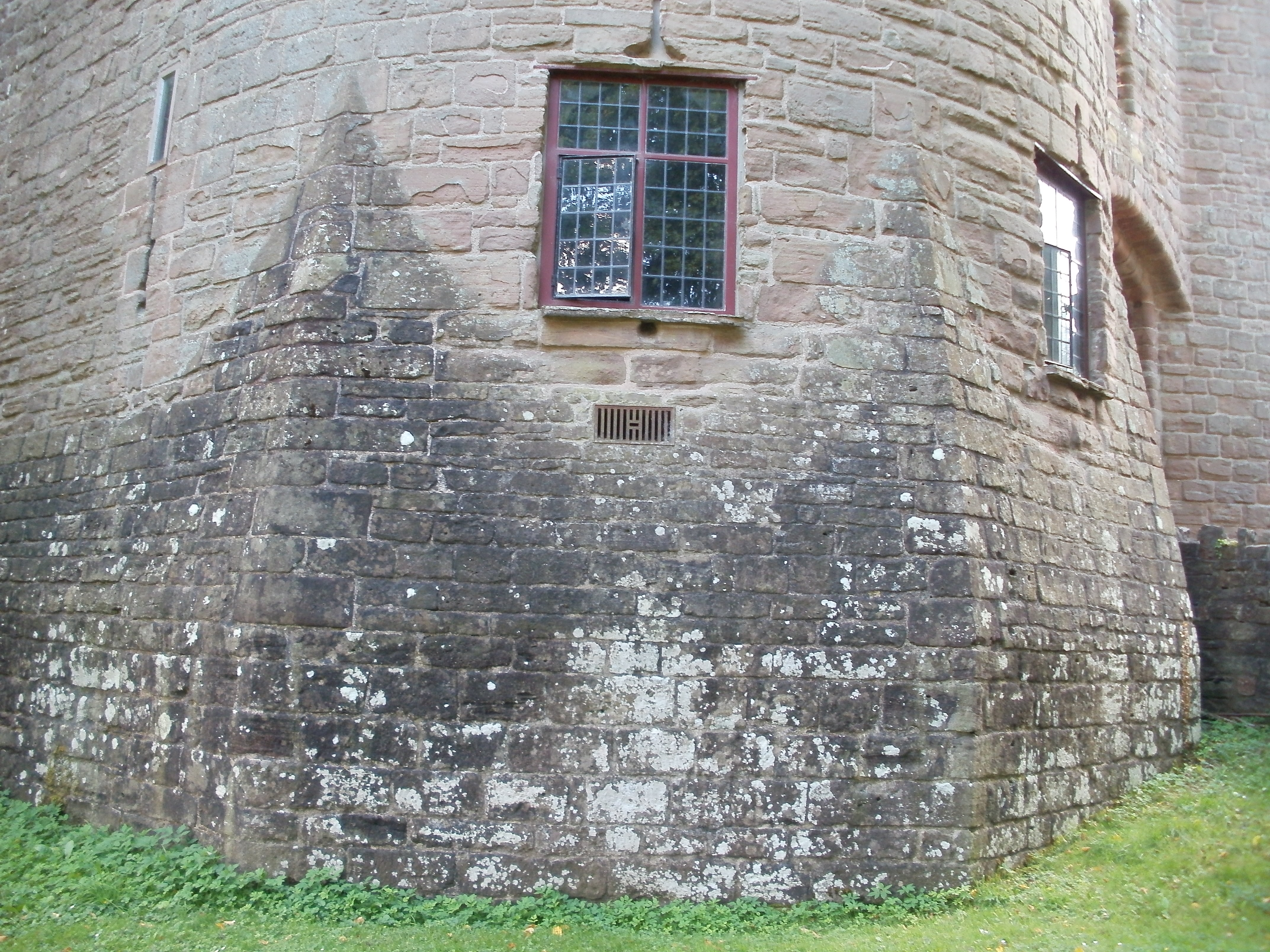
The octagonal "spurs" designed to prevent undermining.

St Briavels Castle appears to date from Norman times, although the village itself predates the Norman period. The area was acquired by William FitzOsbern, the first Earl of Hereford in 1067, who built a number of castles across the region, including Chepstow, Monmouth, Clifford and Wigmore. It does not appear that FitzOsbern built a castle on the St Briavels site, however, and the revolt of FitzOsbern's son, Roger de Breteuil resulted in the village being taken into the possession of the royal bailiffs of the Forest of Dean.

St Briavels Castle was constructed sometime between 1075 and 1129 by royal mandate, although the precise date is uncertain. Walter de Gloucester, the Sheriff of Gloucester and his son Miles de Gloucester made St Briavels Castle the administrative centre of the Forest of Dean. The location of the castle placed it well behind the English border, in an area with little Welsh presence before the invasion, and it therefore appears to have been established for the purposes of royal governance, rather than to protect the Welsh Marches to its west. Equivalents elsewhere in the south-west include Restormel Castle and Lydford Castle in Devon and Cornwall, both regional royal administrative centres. One alternative view, however, sees St Briavels as intended to protect the Severn estuary to the south, along with the royal castles of Bristol and Gloucester. This early castle was of motte and bailey design, the keep probably of wood.

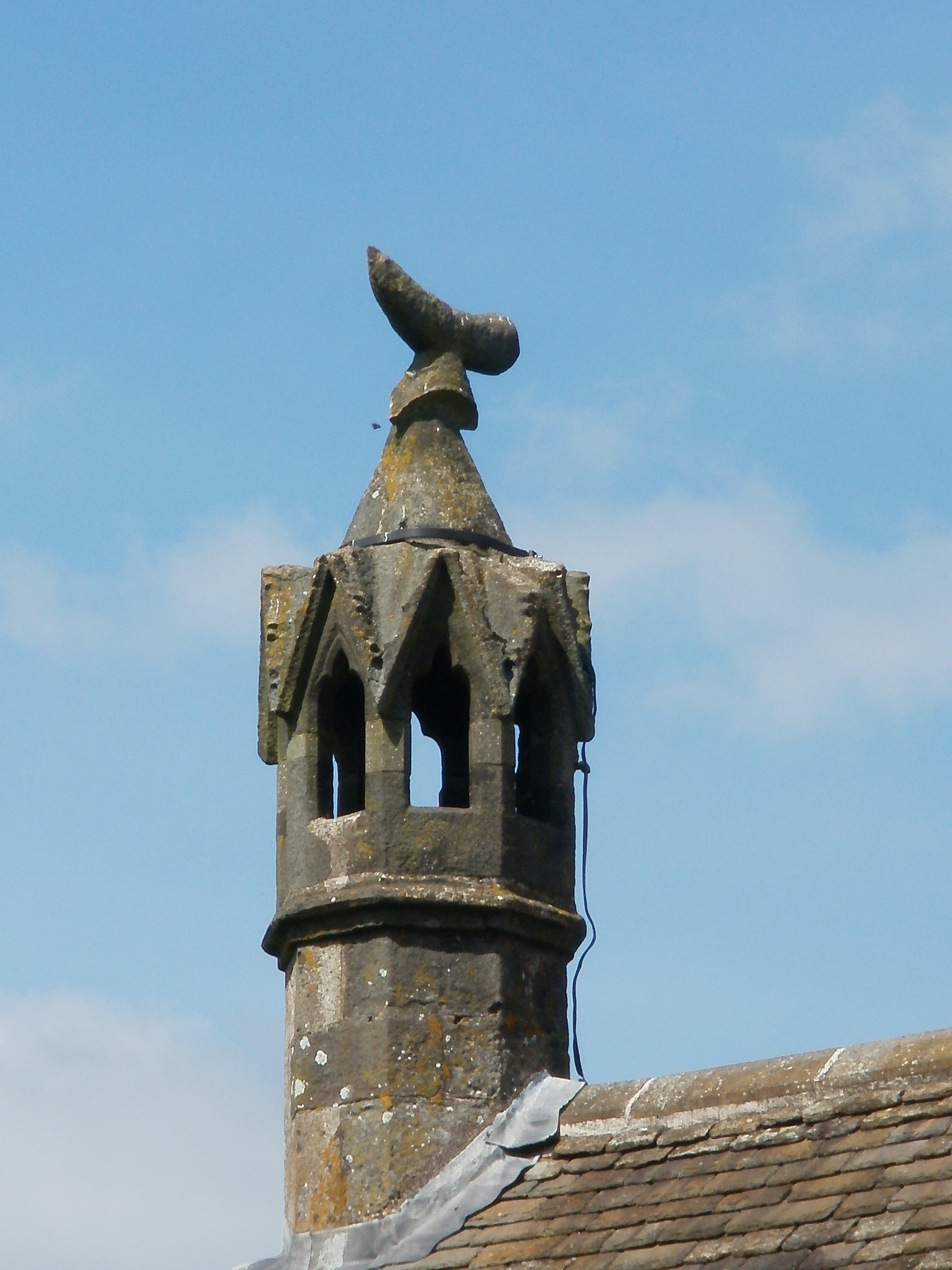
The famous "Forest Horn" chimney of St Briavels Castle.

Miles and his partner Pain fitzJohn strengthened their hold on the Welsh border during the last years of Henry I, but after the king's death in 1135 England descended into the civil war of the Anarchy, as factions loyal to King Stephen and the Empress Matilda fought for control of the country. Fitz John was killed early in the fighting, but Miles declared in favour of Matilda and took control of the castle in his own right. In 1141 the Empress confirmed Miles as the Earl of Hereford and formally granted him St Briavels Castle. Under Miles, the castle escaped the worst of the fighting of the Anarchy. Miles' son, Roger Fitzmiles continued to hold the castle into the reign of Henry II, the empress' son, but a confrontation with the king resulted in it being removed from the earldom and taken back into royal ownership, once again as part of the Forest of Dean. Henry II rebuilt the castle keep in the 1160s, replacing the older wooden structure with stone.

Royal forests in the early medieval period were subject to special royal jurisdiction; forest law was "harsh and arbitrary, a matter purely for the King's will". Forests were expected to supply the king with hunting grounds, raw materials, goods and money. The Forest of Dean could be used for hunting, but was more important to the king as a major metalworking centre, thanks to the plentiful supply of trees for making charcoal and the iron deposits in the limestone stone of the region. The iron goods constructed locally were stored at the castle before being shipped to other royal locations. The quantities being produced were substantial – in 1172, for example, Henry II received 100 axes, 1,000 picks, 2,000 shovels and 60,000 nails from St Briavel Castle. Richard I took 50,000 horseshoes on crusade with him from St Briavel. The constable of St Briavel Castle had wide-ranging responsibilities within the Forest, including managing the rights and privileges of the iron-workers, exercised through the Miners' and the Hundreds Court of the castle.

=== 13th century ===
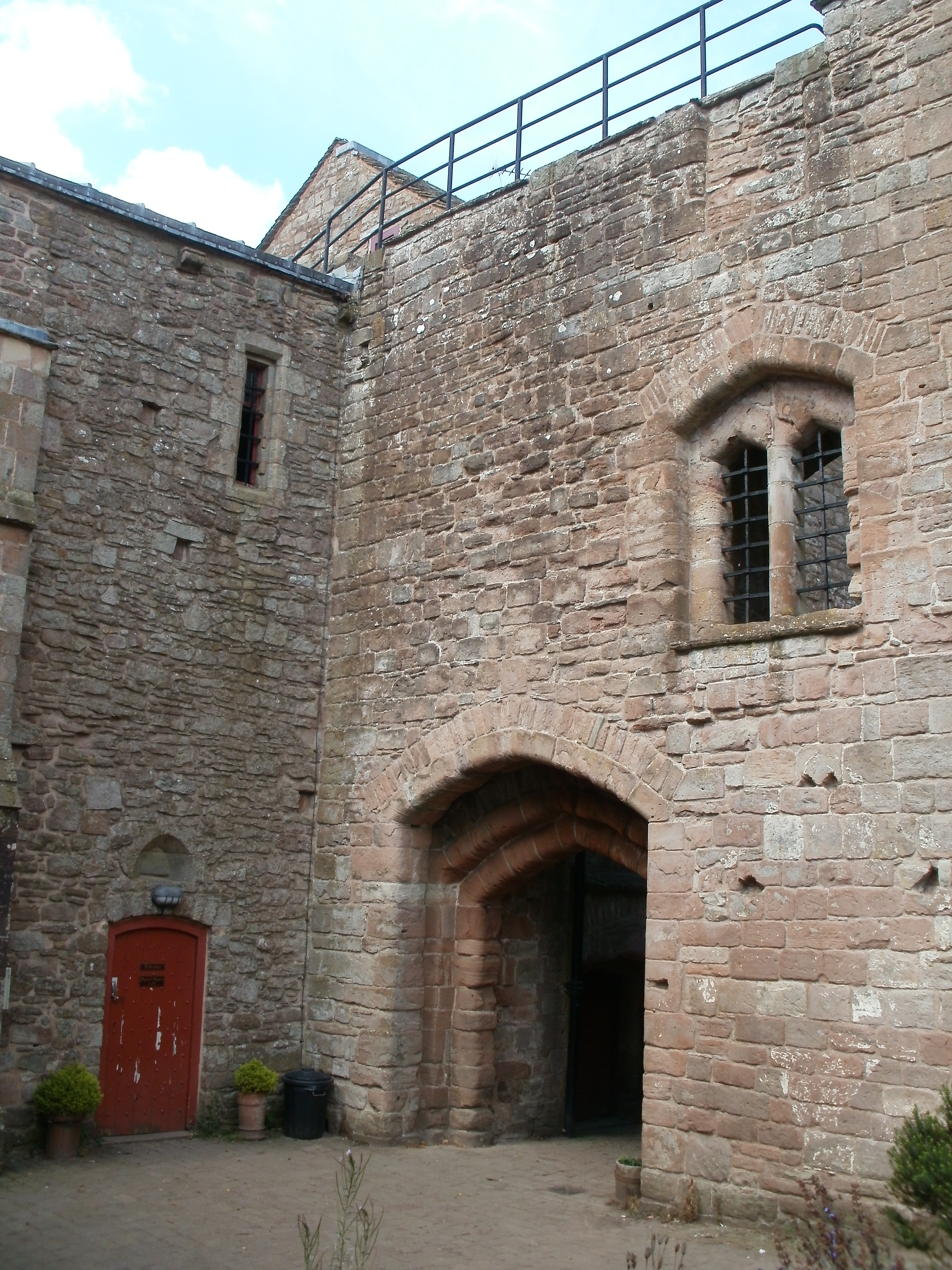
The inner face of St Briavels Castle gatehouse.

King John enjoyed regular hunting in the Forest each November, and used St Briavels Castle as his base for such trips. The king entertained the Welsh lord Gruffyd ap Cadwallon at the castle in 1207. This royal interest resulted in further building works and substantial expenditure, with £291 being spent in the next four years. A stone curtain wall replaced an earlier wooden one between 1209–11, complete with a tower and gateway. Inside the bailey a number of buildings suitable for use by the king as a lodge were constructed. A wooden chapel was built within the castle in 1236–7. The castle expansion may have been funded by the increased taxes from iron-working across the areas, and by the end of John's reign, the castle was almost in its mature form.

In 1217 the Charter of the Forest was passed, in part to mitigate the worst excesses of royal jurisdiction. The forest laws, however, did allow for a very wide range of fines to be imposed on local peasants who broke the numerous edicts in place to protect both wildlife and the trees in the forest. The courts held at St Briavels Castle imposed a relatively large number of fines, or amercements, for both illegal wood-cutting and the poaching of venison during the period. The castle also began to be used a prison shortly afterwards, partially for forest trespassers and for those who could not pay the required fines.

After King John's death, however, St Briavels Castle became the primary centre for English quarrel manufacture. The crossbow was an important military advance on the older short bow and was the favoured weapon by the time of Richard I – many crossbows and even more quarrels were needed to supply royal forces. Crossbows were primarily built at the Tower of London, but St Briavels Castle, with the local forest to provide raw materials, became the national centre for quarrel manufacture.

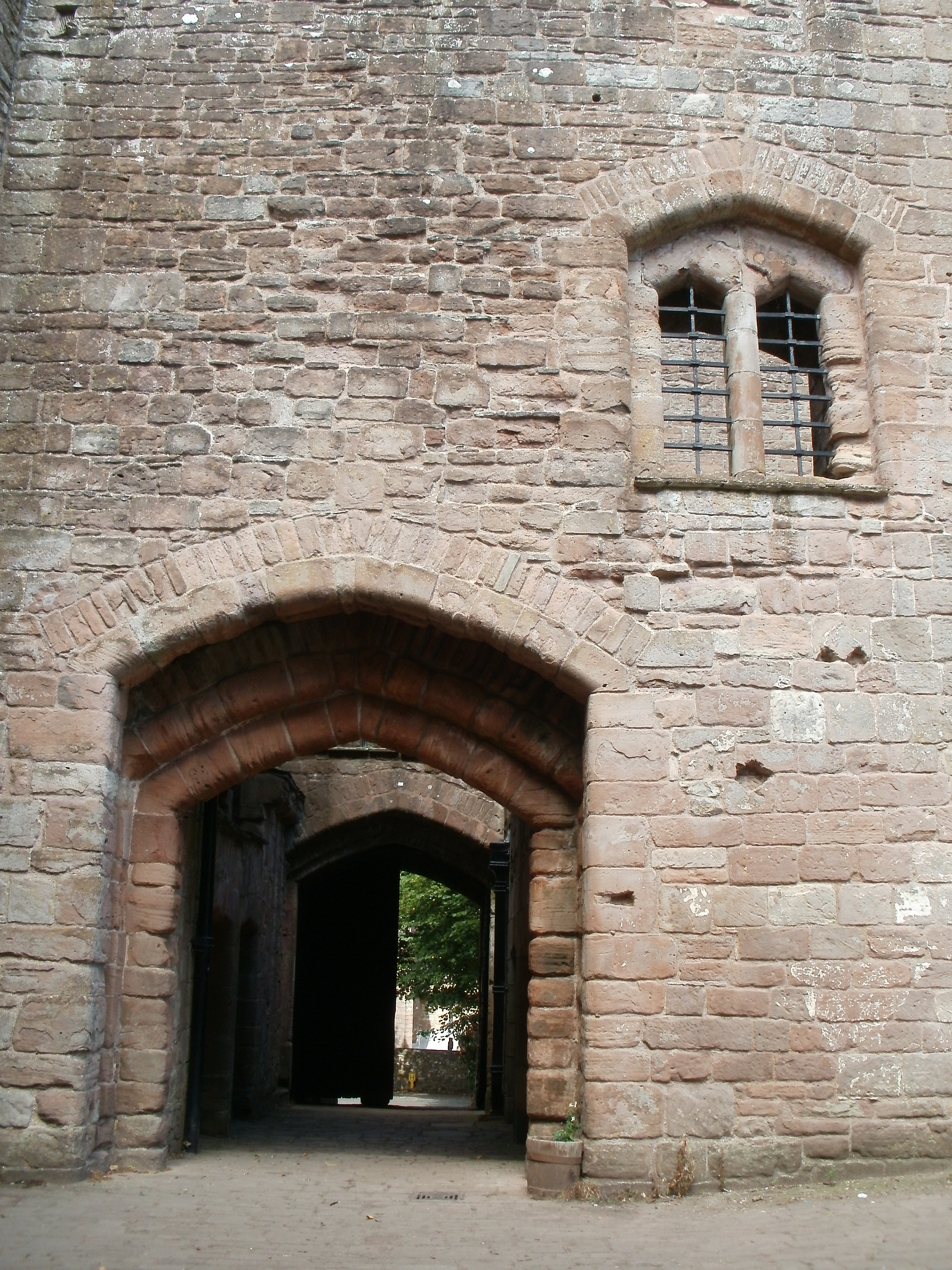
The gatehouse passageway, uniquely defended with three portcullises.

In 1228 John Malemort, William the Smith and William the Fletcher arrived at the castle and began production operations at a forge built within the bailey. A production level of 120,000 quarrels in a 120-day period was achieved by 1233, with men like Malemort being able to produce up to 100 quarrels a day. Quarrels were then put into barrels and shipped across the kingdom in large quantities. Other iron from the castle was sent to build siege engines in Hereford. The manufacturing capability of St Briavels Castle gave the king a distinct advantage over potential baronial enemies, with the supply of arms from the castle to Marcher Lords threatened by the Welsh being one of the levers of royal power during the period.

Now a centre for arms manufacture, the castle was made more secure, with a new defensive ditch, freshly repaired walls and a new chapel. The castle was garrisoned with royal troops during the uprising of Richard Marshal against Henry III in 1233–4, suggesting it had considerable military value at this time. Another indicator of the military importance of the castle and the surrounding forest was the £20 fee each year being paid to the constable of the castle by 1287, on a par with the much larger castles of Rhuddlan or Nottingham.

Under Edward I, the massive gatehouse was built to protect the castle entrance, including special protection against undermining. There has been speculation that the royal architect James of Saint George may have been responsible for the building work, which occurred between 1292–3 at a cost of £477. The reason for the king extending the castle at this time is unclear, as the castle was relatively far from the Welsh border and in no particular risk of attack. One popular explanation is that given the quantities of weapons and money being stored at the property by this time, the gatehouse was designed to improve the internal security of the castle; the presence of the additional portcullises would also support this explanation. In 1300, the old wooden chapel was rebuilt in stone and in 1310, an extension to the castle wall was constructed at a cost of £40; called 'the Peel', this followed the line of the old motte and gave additional protection to the keep.

=== 14th–17th centuries ===
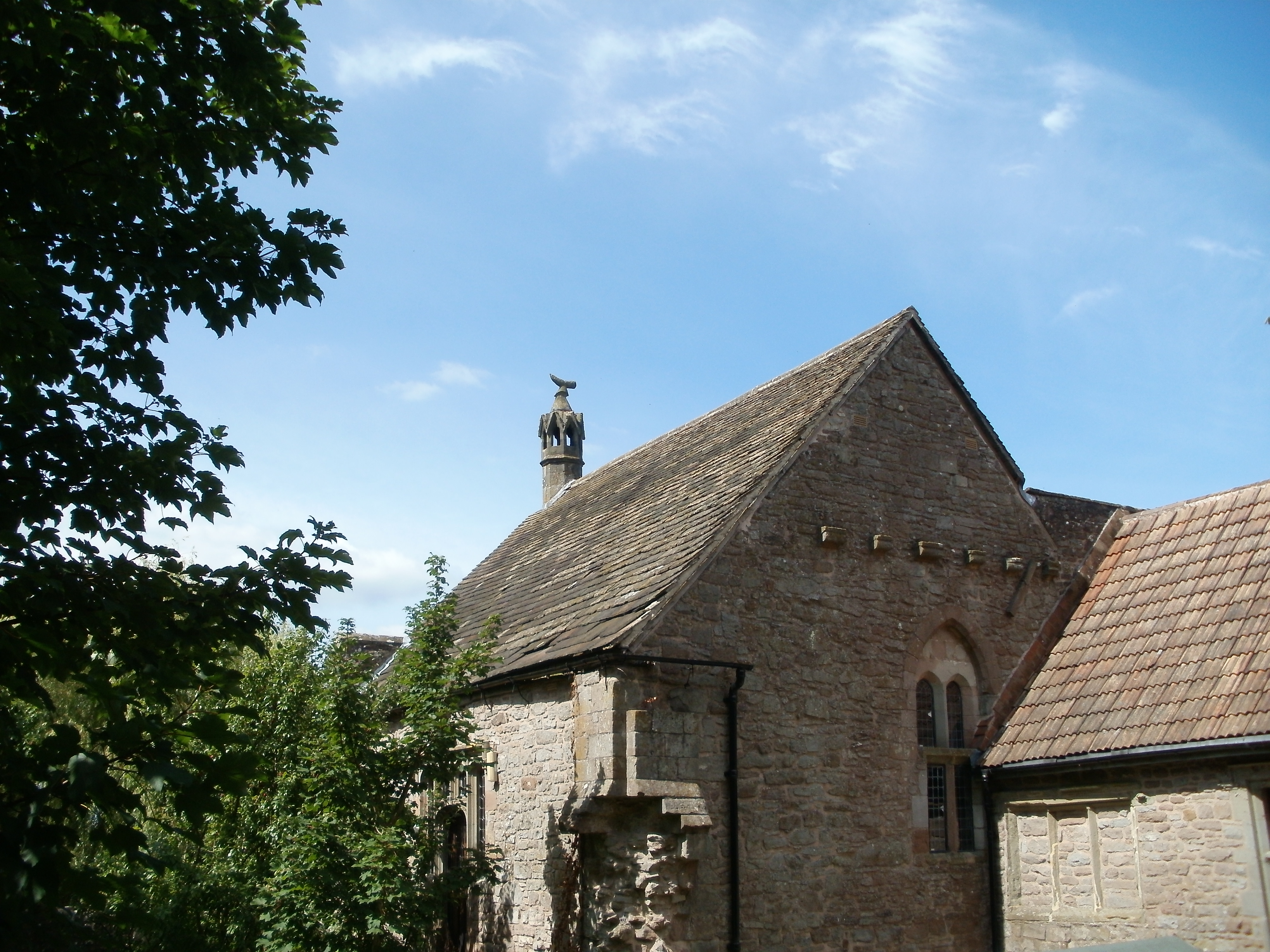
St Briavel's Castle chapel, redesigned in the 17th century

St Briavels Castle remained an important location in the reign of Edward II, as the Welsh Marches were a key region in the wars between the king, his favourites and various noble factions during the period. Roger d'Amory was the constable of the castle during the early years of Edward's reign. D'Amory was a royal favourite and Edward II visited the Castle several times, with an extensive renovation of the rooms and quarters occurring during this time. Around £500 was spent on the work, a substantial sum.

D'Amory was supplanted in the king's favour by Hugh Despenser the Younger, and d'Amory fought against the king in the Despenser War of 1321-22. After the war, Edward placed the Marches under the control of the Despensers, with Hugh Despenser the Elder taking particular responsibility for St Briavels. The Despensers appointed Robert Sapy as the keeper of St Briavels and the other confiscated castles across the Marches. Violence began to break out across the region in response to the Despenser's harsh rule, and Sapy's deputy was attacked in July 1325 on his way back from St Briavels Castle to London; his eyes were torn out, his arms and legs broken and all his records and money stolen. Edward and the Despensers were deposed shortly afterwards by Edward's wife, Isabella of France. Isabella set about expanding her own lands after her victory, and took St Briavels Castle and various other royal castles into her own possession. When Isabella herself was overthrown by her son, Edward III, in 1330 the castle then reverted to the crown.

Towards the end of the 14th century, England saw increasing conflict between the rival Yorkist and Lancastrian factions. St Briavels Castle passed back and forth between the senior nobility on either side, but without playing a major part in the conflict itself. The castle was initially given to King Edward's son Thomas, Duke of Gloucester; with the fall of Thomas from favour after his uprising against Richard II, Thomas le Despenser received a life grant of the castle in 1397, as part of his reward for serving Richard. With Thomas' own fall from power under Henry IV, the castle was then given to Henry's son, the Duke of Bedford. Henry Beauchamp, the Duke of Warwick and a close friend of Henry IV, then acquired St Briavels Castle and the Forest of Dean around 1445. William Herbert was rewarded with the castle in 1467 for his support for Edward IV and the Yorkist faction during the Wars of the Roses; he was then executed by the Lancastrian Richard Neville, Earl of Warwick, who took the castle for his own. Warwick died himself at the Battle of Barnet in 1471, but after being briefly held by Robert Hyet, Henry VII restored St Briavels Castle to Neville's widow, Anne Neville, 16th Countess of Warwick. With Anne's death in 1492, the castle passed into the control of Thomas Baynham.

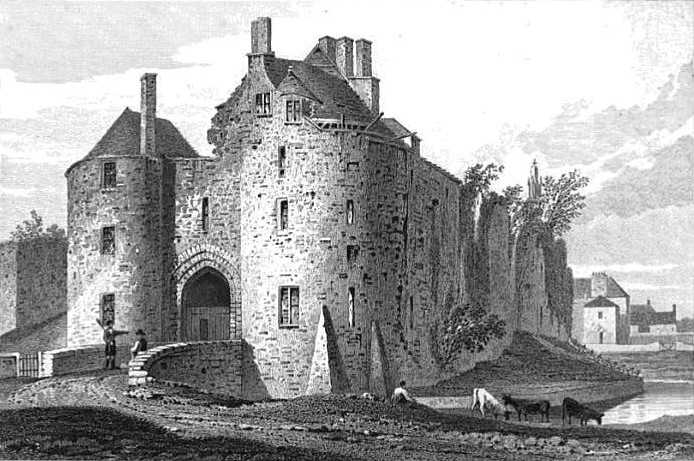
St Briavels Castle in 1823

By this time, however, St Briavels Castle had been in a slow period of decline for many years, similar to that of several other royal castles in the region, including Bristol and Gloucester. Minor improvements were made, including various light windows added to the internal buildings in the 15th century, and extensive restyling of the chapel in the 17th century, but not to the extent of those castles successfully converted to more luxurious dwellings.

Under James I and Charles the castle was traditionally granted to the Earls of Pembroke. By the time of the English Civil War, St Briavels Castle was held by Philip Herbert, the 4th earl and a friend of the king's. Philip Herbert sided with Parliament, however, and St Briavels' played little part in the conflict. With the Restoration and the return of Charles II to power in 1660, the castle was removed from the Earls of Pembroke and given instead to Henry, Lord Herbert of Raglan for life. After Henry's death, Duke of Beaufort was granted the property; after the disgrace of the Duke of Beaufort a few years later, the castle changed hands again, with the subsequent owners being more modest figures in English public life than had been the case in previous years.

=== 18th and 19th centuries ===
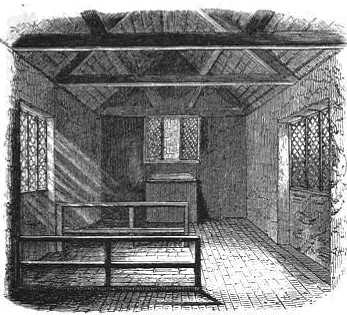
The courtroom at St Briavels Castle in early Victorian times.

In the 18th century many of the buildings inside the bailey were knocked down and the more valuable materials, including the lead from the roof, recycled. The keep partially collapsed in 1752, with the remainder falling down in 1777. Victorian writers blamed both the progress of time and the theft of stones by local peasants for the collapse. The famous "forester's horn" chimney was moved from its original location to the west side of the building between 1783 and 1824. Whilst not achieving the picturesque status of other ruined castes in the area, Georgian visitors noted the "beautiful and romantic scenery that surrounds these ruins".

The castle was now principally a prison and a court, still operating under the authority of the constable and the Forest Law originally established in 1217. The remaining buildings inside the bailey were converted into a courtroom and jury room, with the west side of the gatehouse being used as a jail for detaining prisoners. St Briavels Castle was primarily a debtors' prison – in England up until the Debtors' Act 1869 (32 & 33 Vict. c. 62), individuals unable to pay their debts or fines could be detained in prison indefinitely to encourage payment. The conditions in the castle prison became increasingly notorious after a visit from the prison reformer John Howard in 1775 as part of his research for the first edition of his book The State of the Prisons, published two years later. Howard found the prison "greatly out of repair", with the two inmates locked in a single room without exercise for the best of a year, with no fresh water, financial support or firewood. Graffiti on the stone walls of the castle jail includes the mournful inscription by a prisoner of the period "For I have been here a great space; And I am weary of the place."

In 1831 there were extensive riots in the Forest of Dean, led by Warren James. After the intervention of the military, the rioters were dispersed and order restored, but a range of complaints were levied about the enforcement of the local laws on miners and metal-workers. There had been attacks against St Briavels Castle by discontented locals before during the 1780s, but the degree of violence in this case was much greater. An act of Parliament, the Forest of Dean commissioners, etc. Act 1831 (1 & 2 Will. 4. c. 12), followed, establishing a number of commissioners who investigated local practices and recent events at the Castle.

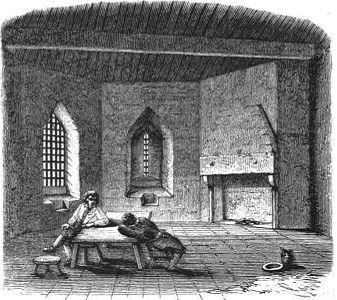
The notorious debtors' prison at St Briavels Castle in early Victorian times.

The debtors' prison at the castle came in for particular scrutiny. It emerged that out of the 402 cases brought before the court at St Briavels' Castle, 397 of them were for extremely small sums of debt of £5 or less (£373 in 2009 prices), increasingly unacceptable in Victorian eyes. A penalty of up to £7 (£522 in 2009 prices) was also being charged for each case, making the process extremely onerous for the local poor being prosecuted in this way. The investigation found that the keeper of the debtors' prison, which could hold up to six inmates at a time, was appointed by the constable, and made part of his income by charging each prisoner one shilling a week for the use of the beds in the prison; with no other public funding, prisoners depended on friends or relatives for food and other essentials, or from donations from their original parishes.

The castle prison was found to still be in a very bad condition. The commissioners noted how the prison had "only one window, which is one foot wide and in a recess. It does not open.... There is a door at the outer end of the passage, and in it a hole which is considered necessary for air... The privy is a dark winding recess... It leads to a hole going down to the bottom of the building, which is always inaccessible for cleaning, but which until six years ago had a drain from it to the moat; the air draws up from it into the passage and the room. There is no water within for the prisoners' liberty, and they are obliged to get some person to fetch it."

St. Briavels Small Debts Court Act 1842
- Act of Parliament
- Parliament of the United Kingdom
- Long title: An Act to abolish the Court of Saint Briavel's, and for the more easy and speedy Recovery of Small Debts within the Hundred of Saint Briavel's, in the County of Gloucester.
- Citation: 5 & 6 Vict. c. 83
- Territorial extent: United Kingdom

Dates
- Royal assent: 5 August 1842
- Commencement: 5 August 1842 (Note: Section 1.)
- Repealed: 1 January 1970

Other legislation
- Repealed by: County Courts Act 1846; Statute Law (Repeals) Act 1969

Status: Repealed

Text of statute as originally enacted

Prison reforms followed, including improving the conditions of the castle facilities, although visitors continued to note how the castle was "patched and cobbled like a worn-out shoe". In 1838 the role of constable was transformed into the Chief Commissioner of Woods and Forests. The court and jury rooms were turned into a local school, although occasional Courts of Attachment were held in the chapel and the castle retained its function as a prison until 1842, when St Briavels Court and its prison were abolished by the St. Briavels Small Debts Court Act 1842 (5 & 6 Vict. c. 83), which ordered the remaining inmates were transferred to the prison at Littledean. The court was replaced by a new court of requests that sat in Coleford and Littledean.

== Today ==
The gatehouse and the buildings inside the bailey were made habitable again in 1906 and became a youth hostel in 1948. In 1961 the moat was partly infilled and turned into a garden. The castle is classed as a Grade I listed building and as a scheduled monument. The site as a whole remains open to the public, managed by English Heritage.

== See also ==
- Castles in Great Britain and Ireland
- List of castles in England
- Lydford Castle, also used for forest courts

== Bibliography ==
- Birrell, Jean. "Forest Law and the Peasantry in the Later Thirteenth Century," in Coss and Lloyd (eds) 1988.
- Brayley, Edward William and William Tombleson. (1823) A Series of Views of the Most Interesting Remains of Ancient Castles of England and Wales. London: Longman.
- Brown, James Baldwin. (1823) Memoirs of the Public and Private Life of John Howard, the Philanthropist, 2nd edition. London: Thomas.
- Coss, Peter and S.D. Lloyd (eds). (1988) Thirteenth Century England II Proceedings of the Newcastle Upon Tyne Conference 1987. Woodbridge, UK: Boydell Press. ISBN 978-0-85115-513-5.
- Curnow, P.E. and E.A. Johnson. (1985) "St Briavels Castle," in Chateau Gaillard: études de castellologie médiévale. Caen: Centre de Recherches Archéologiques Médiévales. ISBN 978-2-902685-01-1.
- Dunn, Alaistair. (2003) The Politics of Magnate Power in England and Wales, 1389-1413. Oxford: Oxford University Press. ISBN 978-0-19-926310-3.
- Emery, Anthony. (2006) Greater Medieval Houses of England and Wales, 1300–1500: Southern England. Cambridge: Cambridge University Press. ISBN 978-0-521-58132-5.
- Fisher, Chris. (1981) Custom, Work and Market Capitalism: the Forest of Dean Colliers, 1788-1888. London: Croom Helm. ISBN 978-0-7099-1001-5.
- Fryde, Natalie. (2004) The Tyranny and Fall of Edward II 1321-1326. Cambridge: Cambridge University Press. ISBN 978-0-521-54806-9.
- Hicks, Michael. (2002) Warwick the Kingmaker. Oxford: Blackwell. ISBN 978-0-631-23593-4.
- House of Lords. (1838) The Sessional papers of the House of Lords: Volume XI, the Prisons of England; Prisons of Ireland. London: HM Stationery Office.
- Huscroft, Richard. (2005) Ruling England, 1042-1217. Harlow: Pearson. ISBN 978-0-582-84882-5.
- King, David James Cathcart. (1988) The Castle in England and Wales: an Interpretive History. Beckenham, UK: Croom Helm. ISBN 978-0-918400-08-6.
- MacKenzie, James Dixon. (1896/2009) The Castles of England: Their Story and Structure. General Books LLC. ISBN 978-1-150-51044-1.
- Nicholls, Henry George. (1858) The Forest of Dean: an Historical and Descriptive Account. London: John Murray.
- Nicholls, Henry George. (1863/2009) The Personalities of the Forest of Dean. Fineleaf Editions. ISBN 978-0-9534437-2-7.
- Pettifer, Adrian. (1995) English Castles: A Guide by Counties. Woodbridge: Boydell Press. ISBN 978-0-85115-782-5.
- Pounds, Norman John Greville. (1990) The Medieval Castle in England and Wales: a social and political history. Cambridge: Cambridge University Press. ISBN 978-0-521-45828-3.
- Pugh, Ralph B. (1968) Imprisonment in Medieval England. Cambridge: Cambridge University Press.
- Remfry, P.M. (1995) Saint Briavels Castle, 1066 to 1331. Worcester, UK: SCS Publishing. ISBN 1-899376-05-4.
- Rickards, George Kettilby. (1842) The Statutes of the United Kingdom of Great Britain and Ireland, Volume 82. London: Her Majesty's Printers.
- Rudge, Thomas. (1803) The history of the county of Gloucester brought down to the year 1803. Gloucester, UK: Harris.
- The Saturday Magazine. (1838). No. 413, December 1838. London: Parker.
- Society for the Improvement of Prison Discipline and for the Reformation of Juvenile Offenders. (1827) The Seventh Committee Report. London: Cornhill.
- Storer, James. (1808) Antiquarian and Topographical Cabinet, Containing a Series of Elegant Views of the Most Interesting Objects of Curiosity in Great Britain. London: Clarke.
- Thomas, William Heard. (1839) Tinterne and its Vicinity. Bristol: Hamilton and Adams.
- Thompson, M. W. (1991) The Rise of the Castle. Cambridge: Cambridge University Press. ISBN 978-0-521-08853-4.
- Urban, Sylvanus. (ed). (1832) The Gentleman's Magazine, and Historical Chronicle. London: Nicholls.
- Verey, David. (1970/1992) The Buildings of England: Gloucestershire: the Vale and the Forest of Dean. London: Penguin Books. ISBN 0-14-071041-8
- Vicker, Kenneth H. (1961) England in the Later Middle Ages. London: Methuen.
- Weir, Alison. (2006) Queen Isabella: She-Wolf of France, Queen of England. London: Pimlico Books. ISBN 978-0-7126-4194-4.
