= Thomas Cromwell (antiquary) =

English dissenting minister and antiquarian

Thomas Kitson Cromwell (1792–1870) was an English dissenting minister and antiquary.

== Life ==
Born on 14 December 1792, at an early age he entered the literary department of the publishers Longmans.

Brought up a member of the Church of England, of which his elder brother was a clergyman, Cromwell became about 1830 a Unitarian; and, being ordained, was from 1839 minister of Newington Green Unitarian Church, where he officiated for twenty-five years. He also held during the greater part of his ministry the office of clerk to the local board of Clerkenwell, from which he retired with a pension.

In 1864 he resigned the pulpit at Stoke Newington, and soon afterwards took charge of the old Presbyterian congregation at Canterbury, over which he presided till his death on 22 December 1870. He was buried on the 28th of that month in the little cemetery adjoining the chapel. During the last two years of his life he had acted as honorary secretary of the Birmingham Education League. By his wife, the daughter of Richard Carpenter, J.P. and D.L. for Middlesex, he had no issue.

== Works ==
In 1816 he published a small volume of verse, The School-Boy, with other Poems, which was four years later followed by privately printed copies of Honour; or, Arrivals from College: a Comedy. The play had been produced at Drury Lane on 17 April 1819, and was twice repeated,. Oliver Cromwell and his Times, London, 1821 (2nd ed. 1822) was criticised by Thomas Carlyle (Cromwell's Letters and Speeches, 2nd ed. ii. 161 note.) A second drama, The Druid: a Tragedy, 1832, was never acted.

In December 1838 Cromwell became a Fellow of the Society of Antiquaries, and a few years before his death accepted a Ph.D. from the University of Erlangen. Besides contributions to the Gentleman's Magazine, Chambers's Journal, and other periodicals, he supplied the letterpress for James Sargant Storer's Cathedral Churches of Great Britain, 1814–19, and also for Excursions through England and Wales, Scotland, and Ireland, a series published in numbers, London, from 1818.

His other works are:

- Excursions in the County of Essex, 2 vols. London, 1818 & 1819.
- Excursions in the County of Norfolk, 2 vols. London, 1818 & 1819.
- Excursions in the County of Suffolk, 2 vols. London, 1818 & 1819, illustrated by Thomas Higham.
- Excursions on the County of Sussex, London, 1822.
- History and Description of the ancient Town and Borough of Colchester, 2 vols. London, 1825.
- History and Description of the parish of Clerkenwell, London, 1828.
- Walks through Islington, London, 1835.
- The Soul and the Future Life, London, 1859, on the materialist theories of Joseph Priestley.

He is also thought to be the author of:

- The Lives of Eminent and Remarkable Characters, born or long resident, in the counties of Essex, Suffolk & Norfolk, London, 1820.
