= Thomas Higham (artist) =

Thomas Higham (11 February 1795 – 1844) was an English artist specialising in an antiquary and topographical engravings. The British Museum has a large collection of his work donated by his nephew William Aldis Wright.

Thomas Higham was born to Thomas Wright and Charlotte Aldis in Bramfield, Suffolk.

== Gallery ==
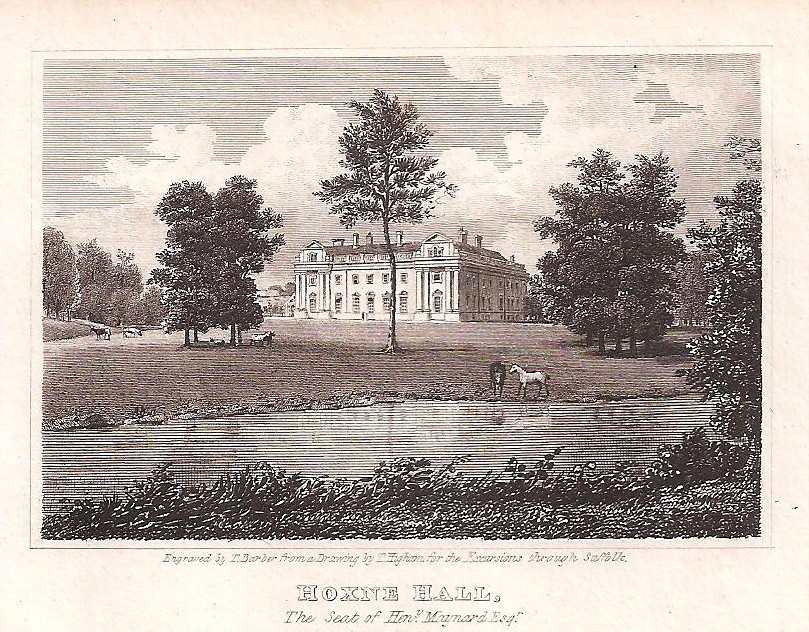
Hoxne Hall, from Excursions Through Suffolk, Vol. 1: Illustrated With Engravings by Thomas Cromwell
