= Mary Rose Young =

British ceramic artist

Coordinates: 51.76947°N 2.572879°W

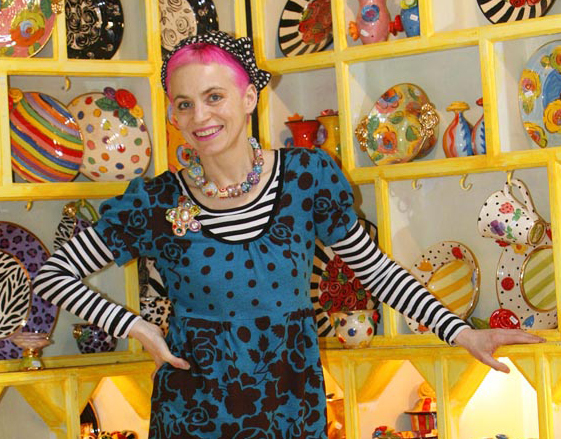
- Mary Rose Young
- Born: 1958 (age 67–68)
- Known for: Ceramics

Mary Rose Young is a ceramic artist who lives and works in the Forest of Dean, Gloucestershire, in the UK.

== Early life ==
Mary Rose Young was born near London in 1958. She studied ceramics at art college in Wolverhampton. Her first piece of her work to be featured in a magazine was a ceramic filofax.

== Career ==
After leaving art college, she developed an interest in producing items using a potters wheel. Applying the bright colour she had used earlier onto her newly thrown pots.

Working from home, she began selling pottery pieces from a barrow at the Dockside Arts Centre, in Bristol, from about 1985. Her earliest designs included the humorous 'frantic chicken' and a rose motif which seemed appropriate next to her name. The roses began to grow in a three-dimensional form on the rims of vases and on the handles of mugs, and she called the look 'Rose Encrusted'.

In 1986 production moved to a small pottery in the village of Parkend. Early recognition of her work at this time came in the form of a magazine article for South West Arts, an interview with Jan Leeming for TV, and acceptance by the Crafts Council for her application to exhibit at the Chelsea Crafts Fair.

In 1990 she relocated to Oak House, on the edge of Parkend, which she decorated in vivid colours to reflect her style. This attracted interior design magazines Metropolitan Home, World of Interiors, Elle Decoration, and others to publish features on Young and her home.

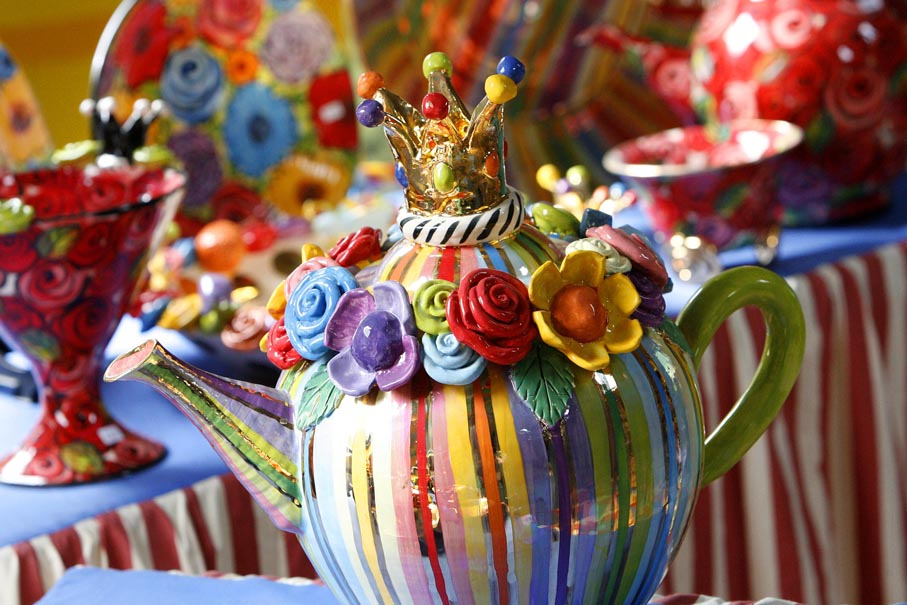
A teacup by Mary Rose Young

In 2007 she attracted new media attention after Ozzy Osbourne's Mary Rose Young teacup and saucer fetched $1,650.00 in a charity auction of his possessions.

In 2017, she opened the first annual 'Party in the Park!' festival in Lydney, Gloucestershire.
