= New Fancy =

Viewpoint and former colliery near Parkend, United Kingdom

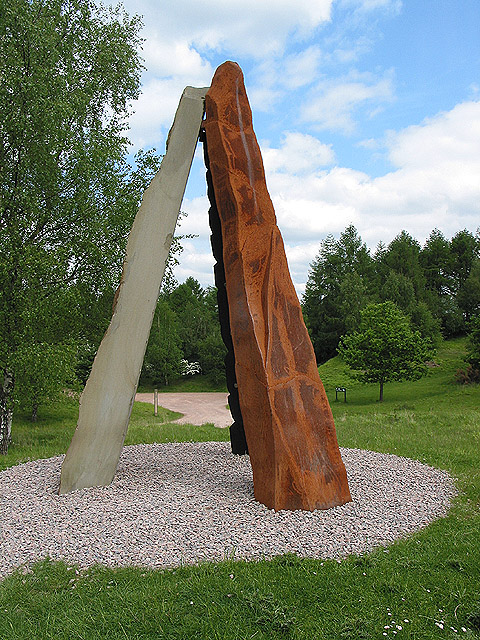
- Roll of Honour sculpture
- Interactive map of New Fancy
- Location: Parkend, Forest of Dean, Gloucestershire, UK
- Coordinates: 51.78335°N 2.5411°W
- Operator: Forestry England
- Status: Open all year

New Fancy was a colliery on the Forest of Dean Coalfield near Parkend in Gloucestershire, England. After the colliery closed its spoil heap was landscaped. The site has a picnic area, and viewing site from where goshawks can be seen. It is linked to the Forest of Dean Family Cycle Trail.

== History ==
New Fancy colliery was opened by Edward Protheroe in 1827, as part of the Park End Coal Company in the Forest of Dean. By 1860 it was owned by Sully & Company and in 1885 was sold to the Parkend & New Fancy Collieries Company. It remained in operation until 1944. In 1880 the colliery produced 8,382 tons of coal. In 1900 the colliery site contained a wooden headframe, a Cornish-type engine house with an external egg-ended boiler built in the 1840s and a hand-operated windlass for raising and lowering items in the shaft. The winding gear was converted to electricity in 1916. Its site is a scheduled monument.

== Bird watching ==
The top of the old coal mine spoil heap has been converted into a viewing site for birdwatchers, and gives panoramas over an extensive forested area. It is best known for viewing raptors, especially goshawks, best seen from late morning onwards in February and March. In February 1998, a female two-barred crossbill was present in a crossbill flock, drawing birdwatchers from across Britain.

== Sculpture ==
The Roll of Honour sculpture was commissioned by the Forest of Dean Local History Society to honour those who worked and were killed or injured in the mines and quarries of the Forest of Dean. It was constructed by Graham Tyler and John Wakefield and was unveiled in 2005. It consists of three elements - stone, iron (represented by rusted steel), and coal (represented by carved and blackened local oak) - and stands around 11 feet (3.4 m) high. Stainless steel discs set into the sculpture represent the tokens carried by miners to determine who was below ground in the event of accidents.

The Forest of Dean Geomap, a 900 square feet (84 m^{2}) sculpture of the geology and mines of the area, was unveiled at the New Fancy picnic site in May 2008. It was commissioned by the local history society, who received a grant from DEFRA’s Aggregates Levy Sustainability Fund, and was constructed by sculptor David Yeates of Mitcheldean before being assembled on site. The rock strata depicted are built from samples of the rock they represent. Metal discs represent the locations of the main iron and coal mines and quarries, with black lines to represent coal seams and white lines for railway routes. It is flat and polished, but not shiny, and is intended to be walked on.
