= Warren James =

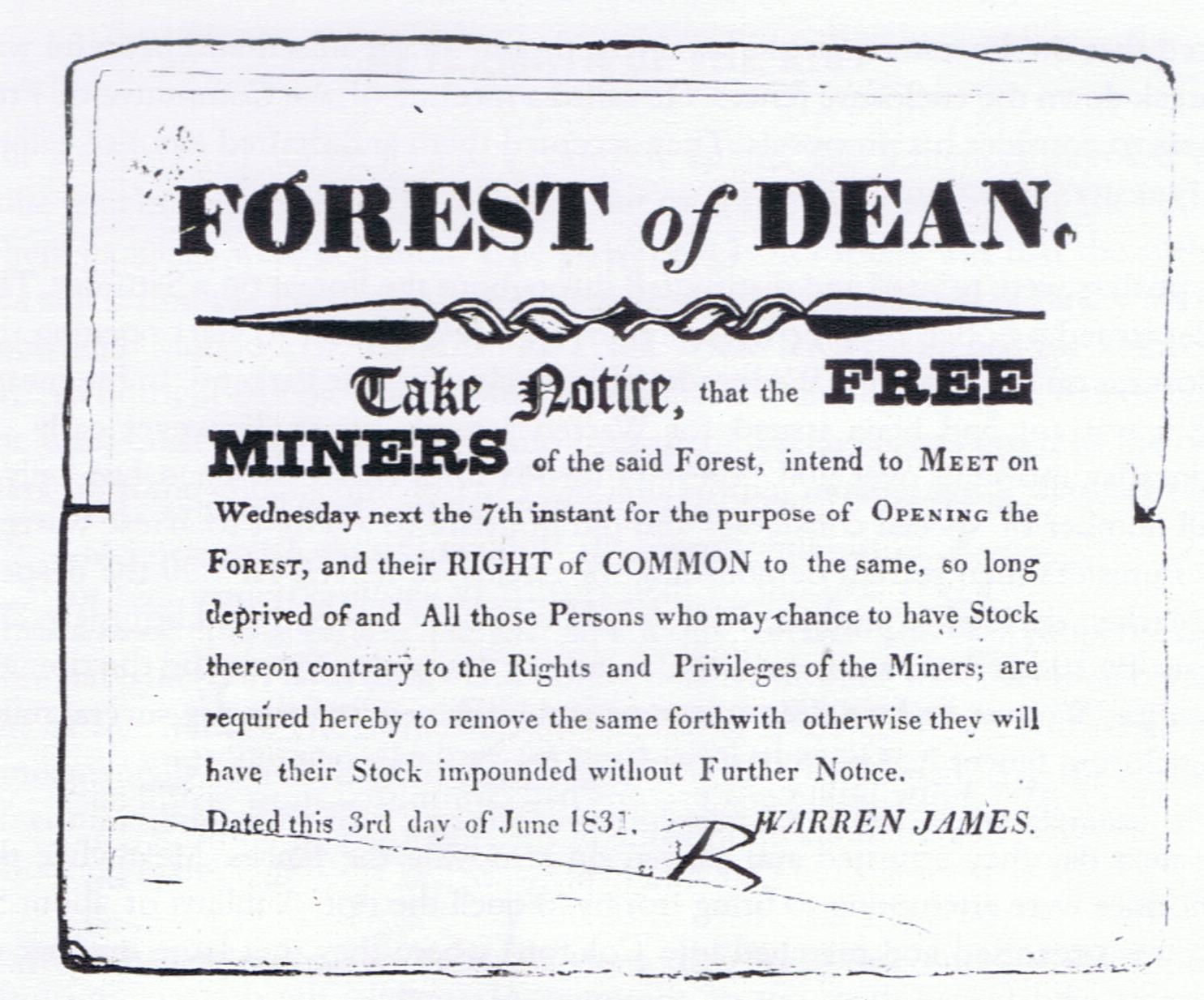
- Warren James' notice to the Free Miners
- Born: July , 1792; Parkend, Forest of Dean
- Died: 26 October 1841; Hobart, Australia
- Resting place: The Parish of Trinity, Hobart, Australia
- Occupation: Miner
- Known for: Miners' leader during the Dean Forest Riots

Warren James (1792–1841) was a rebel leader in the Forest of Dean, England.

As the Industrial Revolution began to take hold in the Forest of Dean, the Crown resolved to dilute the Foresters' freemining rights and introduce free-market forces to the area. Then, in 1808, Parliament directed that large areas of the Forest be enclosed, in order to satisfy an increased demand for naval timber.

Unable to compete with the outside industrialists, and denied their ancient rights to collect timber or graze animals in the enclosed areas, many Foresters descended into abject poverty. Unrest grew and Warren James emerged as a populist leader. In 1831 he led a group of up to 3000 Foresters in open revolt against the Crown, tearing down around 60 miles of fencing in an attempt to retake possession of the enclosures. Warren James was tried and sentenced to death, though this was commuted to transportation to Tasmania. He was pardoned five years later, but, unable to return home, he died in Hobart in 1841. His actions have inspired many other campaigns over the years and he remains one of the most significant figures in Forest of Dean history.

== Early life ==
James's father, also Warren James (1751–1809), married Ann Kear (1755–1836) in 1777. At first, they lived in a rented cottage in Bream, but, in 1782, they moved to an encroachment cottage, which they had built on land between Parkend and Whitecroft. A map dated 1787 shows the family house as being on the southern edge of Parkend, and describes it as a 'Turf' cottage, built on encroached land, and valued by the Crown at 15 shillings per year. Warren James (the younger) was born in July 1792, and was baptised at Bream Chapel on 29 July 1792. He was the fourth son, and sixth born, of nine children.

The younger James appears to have had no formal education, although later documents show that he could read and write as an adult. Along with his six brothers, he followed his father to become a miner at an early age.

Little is known of his family life, though the family were undoubtedly impoverished. Encroachment cottages were illegally built single storey, built of loose stones and covered with turf. They had no windows, only a low door, a crude fireplace with chimney, and a floor paved with stones. The constant threat was that the authorities could destroy their home and remove them from the land. James's house was destroyed and the family removed from the land in 1813, the land being forested after the removal. Aged 20 or 21, James moved with his mother to Bream. He never married.

== Background to the Dean Forest Riots ==
The Forest of Dean is home to a range of natural resources, primarily timber, coal and iron ore. These had been exploited on a small scale since before Roman times, but the possibilities of large scale extraction had not escaped the attention of the Crown. Free-mining rights had been granted to foresters at least as far back as 1244, but there had been a long tradition of disputes between the Crown and foresters over these rights. In 1612, the Earl of Pembroke attempted to enclose extensive areas of forest. In an effort to preserve their rights, the foresters took him to the Exchequer Court and won. There had also been previous riots, such as those which took place in 1631, when Sir Giles Mompesson built three new coal mines.

As the Industrial Revolution began to take hold, the Crown became more determined than ever to introduce the free market into the forest, and with it the right of outside industrialists to own land and mineral rights. They began by outlawing the Mine Law Court in 1777, and physically destroying the Mine Law documents which constituted the laws by which the forest miners governed themselves. Soon industrialists from outside the area began opening large iron and coal mines. The Free Miners found it difficult to compete with these and often ended up working as waged labourers for the new owners.

In 1808, Parliament passed the Dean and New Forests Act 1808 in response to a severe shortage of naval timber. The act included the provision to enclose 11,000 acres (4,452 ha) of the forest. Responsibility for the execution of this part of the Act fell to a young, newly appointed deputy surveyor named Edward Machen. He established his office at Whitemead Park, in Parkend, and in 1814 he enclosed and replanted Nagshead, the main woodland of Parkend. By 1816, all 11,000 acres (45 km^{2}) had been enclosed.

Ordinary foresters were already poverty stricken, but now their plight had grown worse. They were denied access to the enclosed areas and so were unable to hunt in them or remove timber. In particular, they lost their ancient grazing and mining rights. Unrest was growing, but at first there was no organised resistance as the foresters had been told that the fences would be removed after 20 years, once the oaks were mature enough to withstand grazing. In 1828 and 1829, the Foresters petitioned to have the fences removed, but were turned down. In 1830, the 'Committee of Free Miners' chose Warren James to petition the Chief Commissioner and others in London. A petition from James, opposing the commission's parliamentary bill, was presented to the House of Commons on 11 June 1830, but foundered.

After further efforts to have the fences removed failed, James finally called the Free Miners to action. A notice, dated 3 June 1831, was distributed and instructed Free Miners to meet on the following Wednesday "for the purpose of opening the Forest". James and Machen knew each other well, as both were regular churchgoers at Parkend. On Sunday 4 June, they held a public meeting outside the church gates in Parkend. It was a final attempt to resolve the matter peacefully, but they could agree on nothing.

The date given on the notice is "Meet on Wednesday next the 7th instant for the purpose of Opening the Forest...." Wednesday was in fact the 8th, but the wording may only be confusing in the context of modern-day interpretation. In any case, it was on the 8th that they met.

== The riots ==
Machen confronted James at Park Hill enclosure, between Parkend and Bream, but James, who was leading a group of over 100 foresters, proceeded to demolish the fences there. Machen, and about 50 unarmed Crown Officers, were powerless to intervene. He returned to Parkend and sent for troops. On the Friday, a party of 50 soldiers arrived from Monmouth, but, by now, the number of Foresters had grown to over 2,000 and the soldiers returned to their barracks. By Saturday night, there was scarcely a mile of unbroken fence in the forest, but the next day, a squadron of heavily armed soldiers arrived from Doncaster and the day after, another 180 infantrymen arrived from Plymouth.

The Foresters' resistance soon crumbled. Most melted away into the forest and returned home. Warren James was arrested, and committed to trial at Gloucester Assizes on Monday, 13 August 1831.

== Trial of Warren James ==
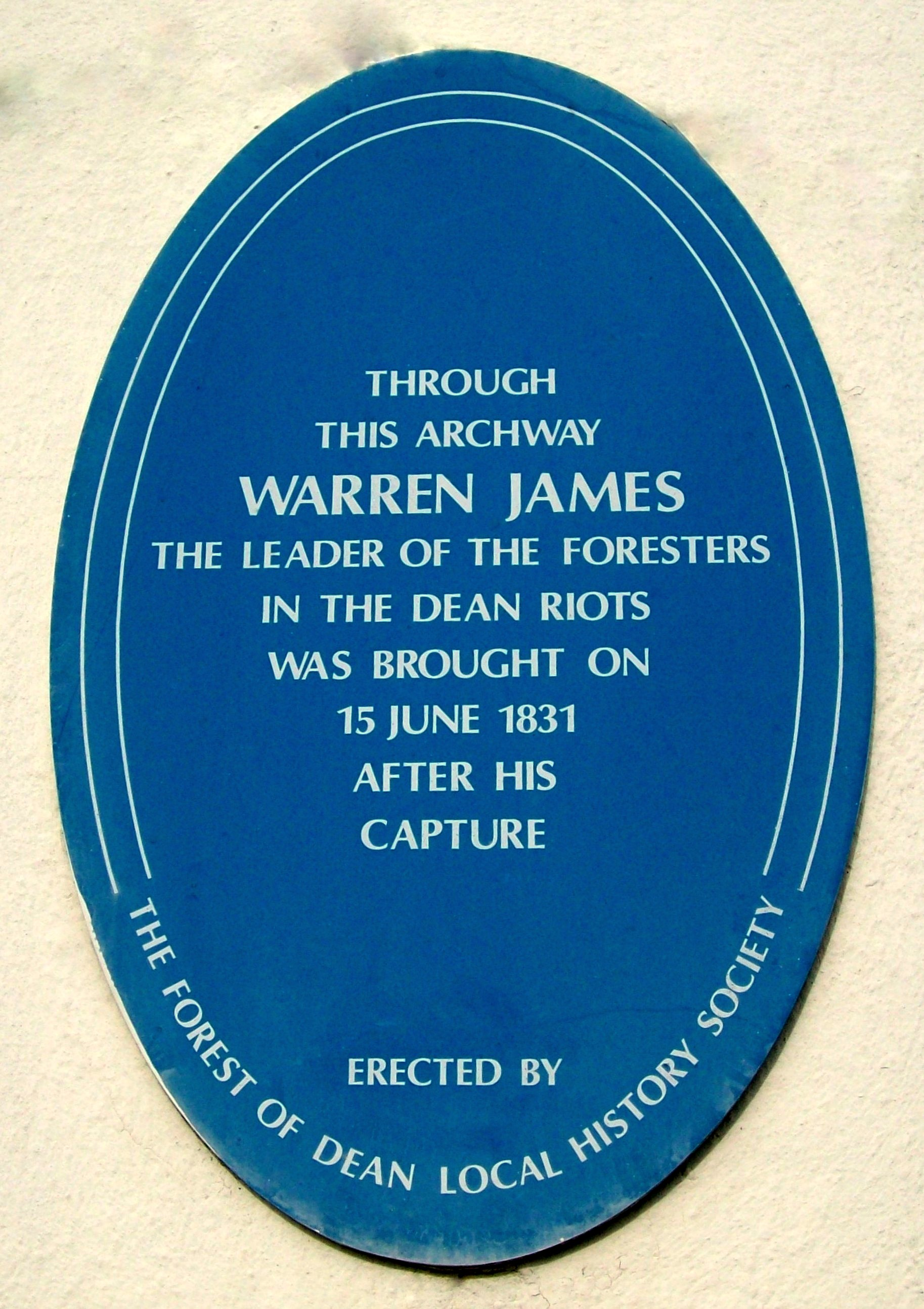
Forest of Dean Local History Society plaque on the wall of The Angel Hotel, Coleford.

Machen was the first, and chief witness at the trial. He spoke about the notice James had issued, and how he had, in turn, issued his own notice cautioning that such action was illegal. He referred to his meeting with James, on the Sunday, and said that James had claimed possession of a document which proved the enclosures were unlawful. Machen went on to say that, on Wednesday morning, (the day of the riot) he had gone to James's house in the morning, asking him to produce the document. James replied that it was in his house and said he would fetch it "and in a minute or two returned, with a pick axe on his shoulder."

Machen then described how he and another magistrate had followed James to the enclosure at Park Hill, how he had warned him again, how James had made the first 'blow', and how he (Machen) had eventually read the Riot Act. After listening to several more witnesses, the jury found James guilty of felony under the Riot Act, but made a plea for clemency on the grounds of his previous good character.

The judge, Mr Justice Patteson, sentenced James to death, but, within two weeks, this was commuted to transportation for life. James was sent to Van Diemen’s Land, modern day Tasmania.

Of the others who were arrested, one other was also sentenced to death, but this, too, was later commuted to transportation. Nine people were sentenced to imprisonment, for periods of up to two years, and several others received smaller sentences or fines. Around a hundred others elected to voluntarily rebuild the enclosures, rather than be charged with rioting.

== Time in Australia ==
The conditions on transport ships were notoriously bad and convicts frequently died en route. James arrived in Tasmania on 14 February 1832, and was assigned to a working party attached to the Public Works Department in Hobart.

It seems that he kept his head down for four years, but on 19 January 1836, he was sentenced to a week's imprisonment for 'neglect of duty and insolence to a magistrate'. Then on 24 February 1836, he was sentenced to thirty six lashes and sent to work in a coal mine near Port Arthur, for 'gross contempt towards the commandant when addressing the prisoners'.

Meanwhile, back in the Forest of Dean, the foresters, supported by Machen, had been petitioning for his pardon. This was granted on 16 February 1836, but didn't reach (or wasn't granted to) James until 13 September, and was given without free passage home.

James decided to stay in Van Diemen's Land, though his reasons are unknown. Certainly, he would have been unable to pay for the passage without assistance, and by now he was also in poor health. It also seems that he had cut himself off from his family and friends, as he apparently had had no contact with them since leaving England.

James died in rented rooms in Argyll Street, Hobart, on 26 October 1841. A moving account of his last few days was given by his landlord, William Overell, at the inquest. In it he describes James's terrible condition and how he had refused medical attention. The coroner recorded the death as being due to "Atrophy of the belly" and "very acute inflammation of the liver".

== Physical appearance ==
No photographs of James exist, but the following description of him, aged around 40, is given on a prison document:

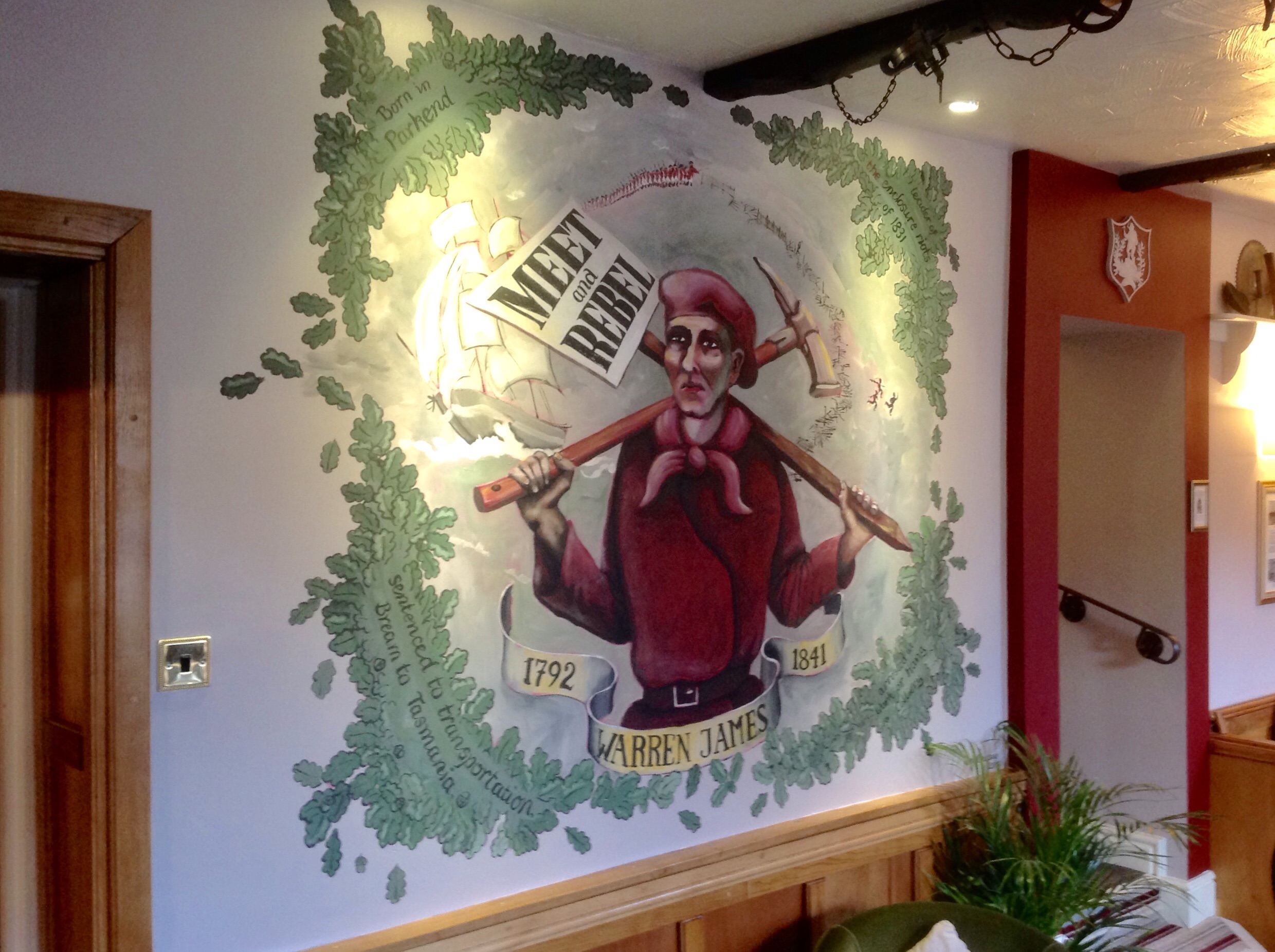
Stylised mural of Warren James at The Fountain Inn, Parkend.

- Height – 5 feet 3 inches
- Complexion – dark
- Head – round
- Hair/Whiskers – black to grey
- Visage – oval
- Forehead – long, sloping back
- Eyebrows – brown
- Eyes – hazel
- Nose – sharp
- Mouth – large
- Chin – medium
- Remarks – stout

Although conjecture, he may also have looked young for his age, as the same document describes him as being 30 on arrival in Tasmania, when he was in fact 40.
