= James Sargant Storer =

James Sargant Storer (1771–1853) was an English draughtsman and engraver.

== Life ==
Storer was born in 1771, and devoted himself to the production of works on topography and ancient architecture, the plates in which he drew and engraved himself on a small scale. From 1814 James Storer worked wholly in conjunction with his eldest son Henry, whom he outlived. He died at his house at Islington on 23 December 1853, and was buried beside his son at St. James's Chapel, Pentonville.

== Works ==
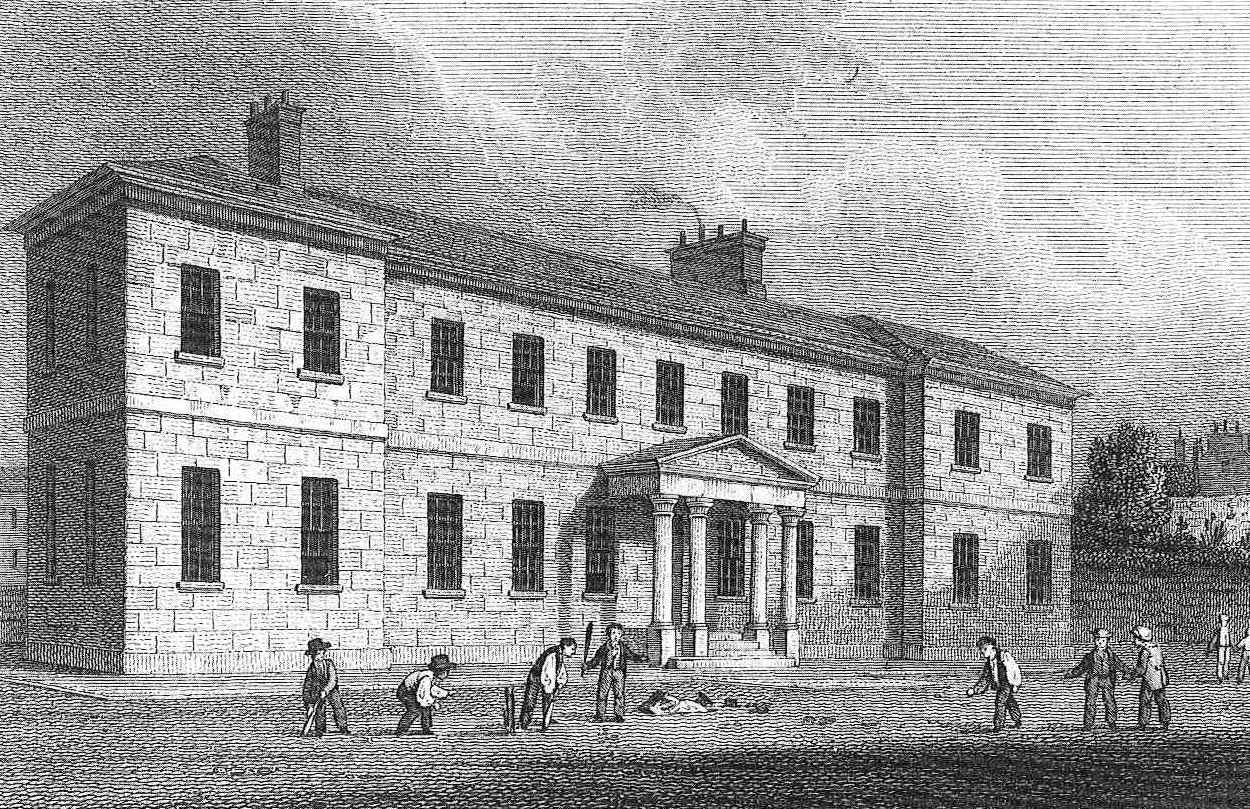
The Royal High School, Infirmary Street, Edinburgh, as it was before 1829; by James Sargant Storer and Henry Sargant Storer.

For some years he was associated with John Greig, another topographical artist. In collaboration they published:

- Cowper illustrated by a Series of Views, 1803;
- Views in North Britain illustrative of the Works of Burns, 1805;
- Views illustrative of the Works of Robert Bloomfield, 1806;
- Select Views of London and its Environs, 1804–5;
- The Antiquarian and Topographical Cabinet, 10 vols., with five hundred plates, 1807–11; and
- Ancient Reliques, 1812.

He was one of the artists employed on John Britton and Edward Wedlake Brayley's Beauties of England and Wales, 1801–1816.

== Family ==
The eldest son, Henry Sargant Storer (1795–1837) was also an engraver, and produced with his father:

- The Cathedrals of Great Britain, 4 vols., 1814–1819;
- Delineations of Trinity College Cambridge, c. 1820.
