= Cinderford New railway station =

Former railway station in England

Cinderford New
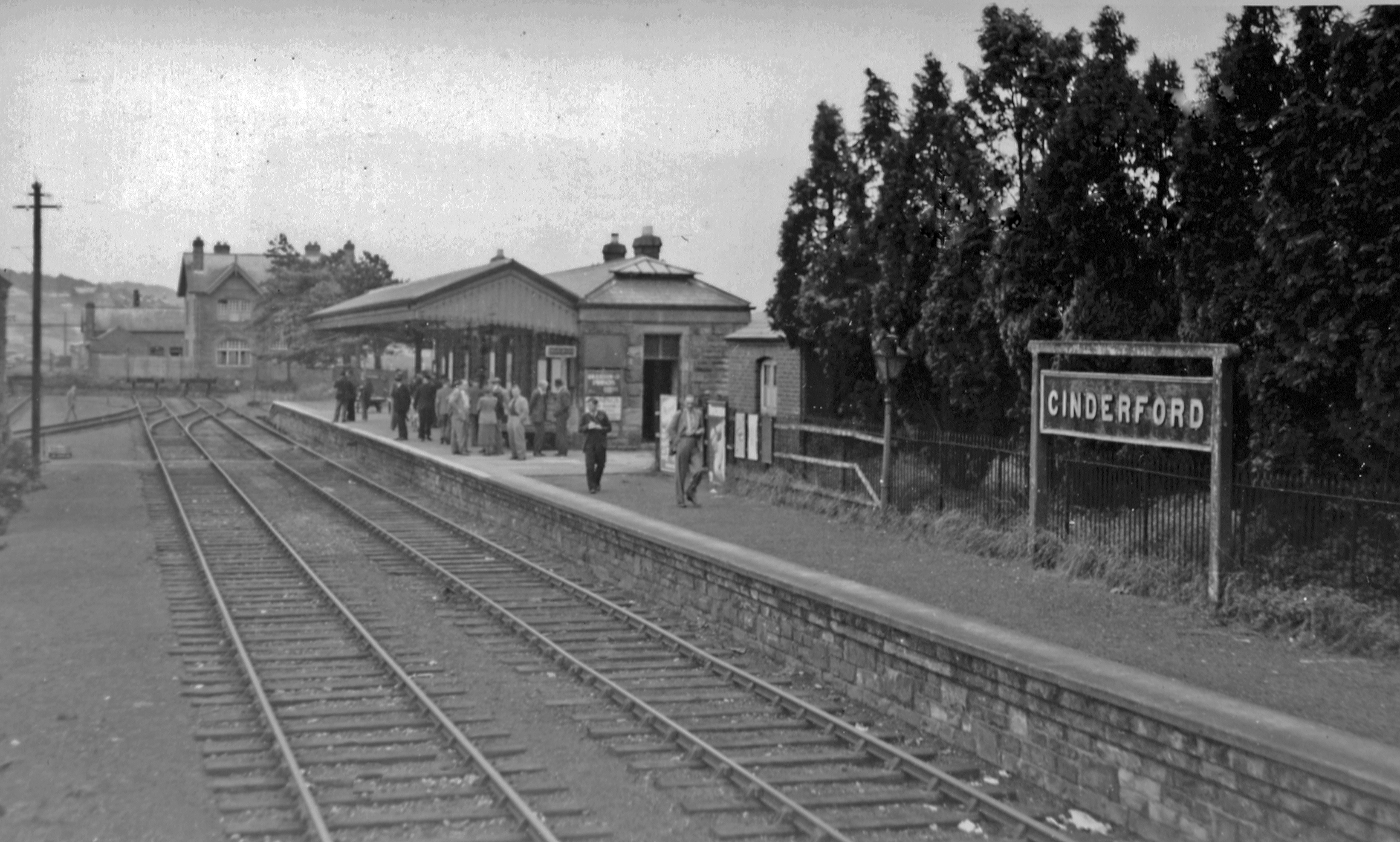
- In 1950

General information
- Location: Cinderford, Forest of Dean; England
- Coordinates: 51.8248°N 2.5067°W
- Grid reference: SO652141
- Platforms: 1

Other information
- Status: Disused

History
- Original company: Severn and Wye Railway/Great Western Railway joint
- Pre-grouping: S&WR/GWR joint
- Post-grouping: S&WR/GWR joint

Key dates
- 2 July 1900: Station opened
- 3 November 1958: Station closed
Location

Cinderford New railway station was a railway station that was opened by the former Severn and Wye Railway to serve the mining town of Cinderford.

The station was later operated by both the Midland Railway and Great Western Railway after a loop to the station, via Cinderford Junction from the Forest of Dean Branch (ex Bullo Pill Railway) at Bilson was constructed.

== History ==
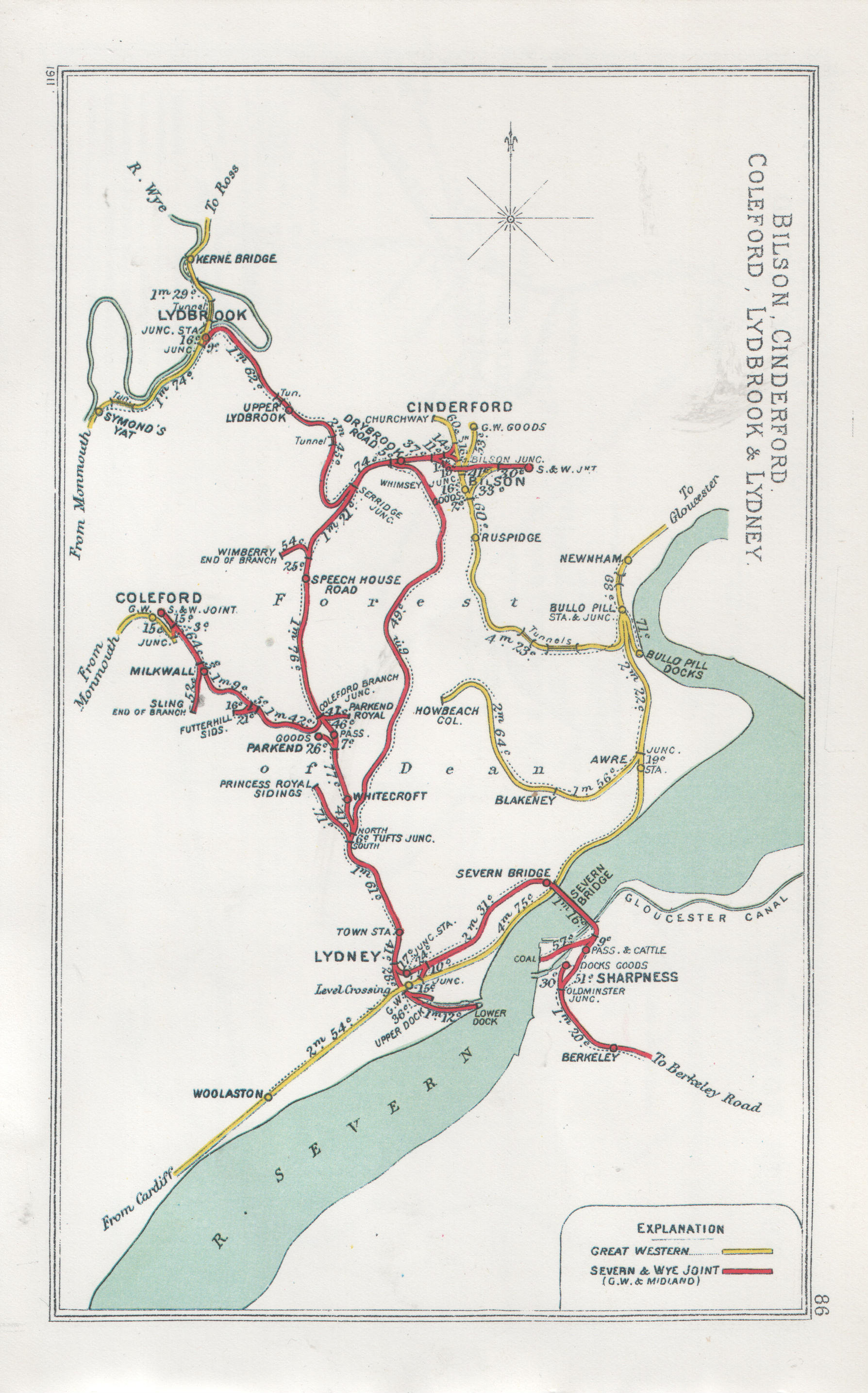
A 1911 RCH map of railways in the vicinity of Cinderford.

The station was located at about 6 miles (9.7 km) from Newnham.

The first idea of a railway station at Cinderford was pressed as early as 1876, however construction on a station did not begin until 1898.

The station was opened for passengers on 2 July 1900 by the Severn and Wye Railway, with the first train being an excursion to Weston-Super-Mare via Parkend, Lydney and the Severn Railway Bridge.

A loop from Bilson junction was completed in April 1908 with a ruling gradient of 1 in 51 over a distance of approximately 30 chains (0.60 km), connecting the former Forest of Dean Railway and the Severn and Wye Railway in a terminus station.

Before this station was opened, Bilson Halt on the Forest Of Dean Branch temporarily served the town from August 1907 until the opening of the loop which connected the two railways.

The last day of passenger services was 1 November 1958. The 14:52 Newnham to Cinderford train consisted of four coaches hauled by a GWR 5700 Class pannier tank locomotive No. 7750 built at Swindon Works. The locomotive collected a Siphon-G from the goods siding at Cinderford (outgoing traffic from Rosedales plastics) and then formed the 16:08 return service to Newnham.

The station remained opened for goods traffic until the line was finally closed in 1967.

== Services ==
Preceding station	Disused railways	Following station
Drybrook Road; Line and station closed	Severn and Wye Railway	Terminus
Bilson Halt; Line and station closed	Great Western Railway; Bullo Pill Railway	Terminus
