= Coleford railway station =

Coleford railway station may refer to:

- Coleford railway station (Coleford Railway)
- Coleford railway station (Severn and Wye Railway)
