= Milkwall railway station =

Disused railway station in Gloucestershire

Milkwall

General information
- Location: Milkwall, Forest of Dean; England
- Coordinates: 51.7807°N 2.6017°W
- Platforms: 1

Other information
- Status: Disused

History
- Original company: Severn and Wye Railway/Great Western Railway joint
- Pre-grouping: S&WR/GWR joint
- Post-grouping: S&WR/GWR joint

Key dates
- 9 December 1875: Station opened
- 8 July 1929: Station closed
Location

Milkwall railway station is a disused station on the former Severn and Wye Railway. It served the village of Milkwall, Gloucestershire, England. The station opened in 1875 and was closed only in 1929 due to lack of passenger use. The line remained in use for goods traffic until the line was closed from Parkend to Coleford.

Today the site of the station is now occupied by an engineering company and the trackbed is now a cycle track from Coleford to Parkend.

== Services ==
Preceding station	Disused railways	Following station
Parkend	Severn and Wye Railway; Later Severn and Wye Joint Railway (MR and GWR)	Coleford (Severn and Wye Railway)
