= Bilson Halt railway station =

Disused railway station in Cinderford, Forest of Dean

Bilson Halt

General information
- Location: Cinderford, Forest of Dean; England
- Coordinates: 51.8236°N 2.5144°W
- Grid reference: SO647137
- Platforms: 1

Other information
- Status: Disused

History
- Original company: Great Western Railway
- Pre-grouping: Great Western Railway
- Post-grouping: Great Western Railway

Key dates
- 3 August 1907: Station opened
- 6 April 1908: Closed to regular services
- 2 April 1917: Regular services resumed
- 1 October 1920: Closed to regular services
- March 1930: Regular services resumed
- 1944: Station closed
Location

Bilson Halt railway station is a disused railway station opened on the former Bullo Pill Railway, later known as the Great Western Railway Forest of Dean Branch.

== History ==
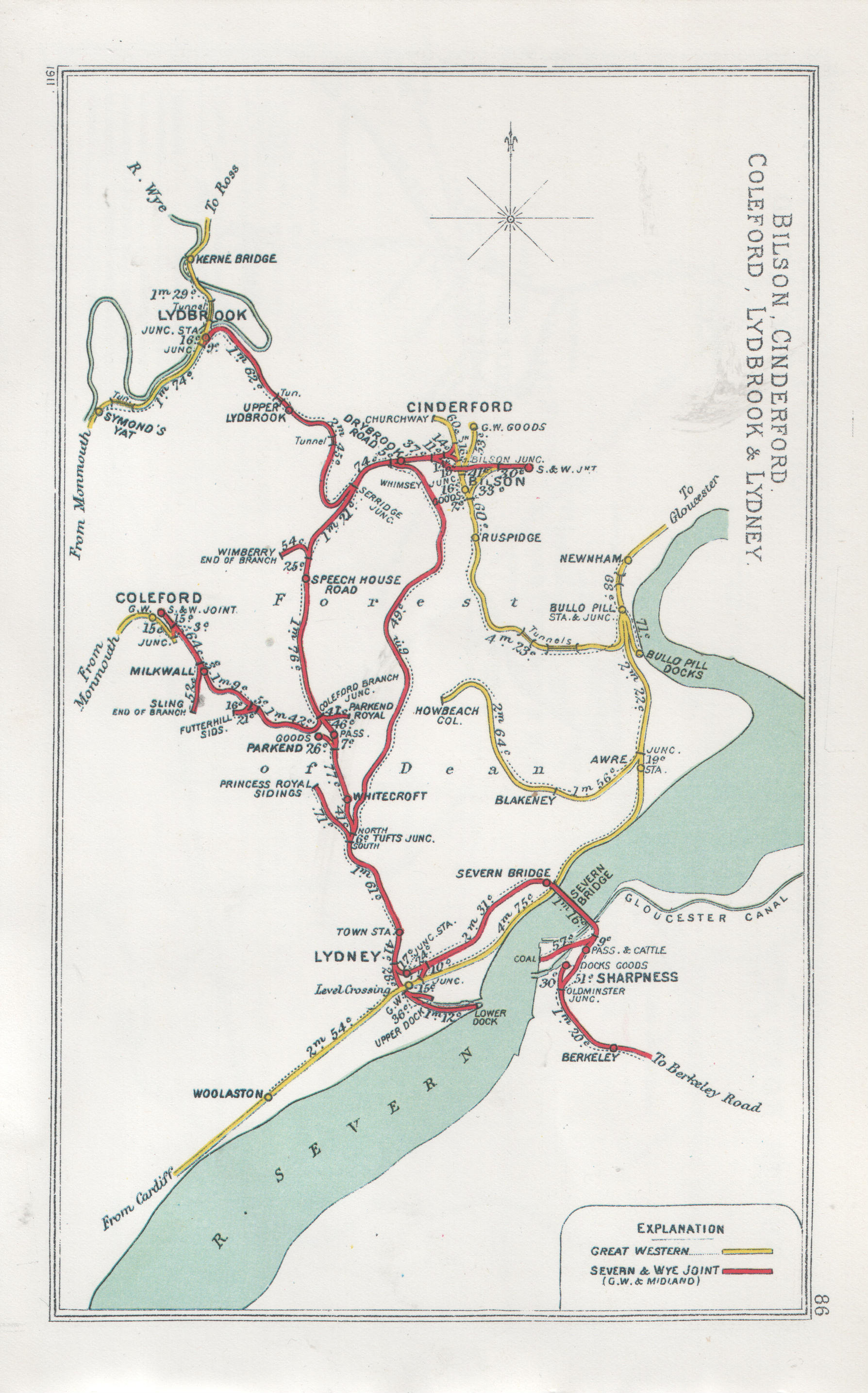
A 1911 RCH map of railways in the vicinity of Bilson Halt

The Halt, which was just to the south of Letchers Bridge and Bilson Junction/Yard was located about 4 miles 61 chains (7.7 km) from Newnham on a 1 in 1280 gradient.

The station opened for passenger services when they were introduced in August 1907, the low platform was constructed from wood and two pagoda style buildings were provided from the outset.

The Halt temporarily served Cinderford until the Bilson loop was opened which allowed trains to run into the Severn and Wye station that was closer to the town.

The halt remained in unadvertised use until 1944, when it was finally removed.

== Services ==
Preceding station	Disused railways	Following station
Ruspidge Halt; Line and station closed	Great Western Railway; Bullo Pill Railway	Whimsey Halt; Line and station closed
Ruspidge Halt; Line and station closed	Great Western Railway; Bullo Pill Railway	Cinderford New; Line and station closed
