= Drybrook Road railway station =

Former railway station in England

Drybrook Road
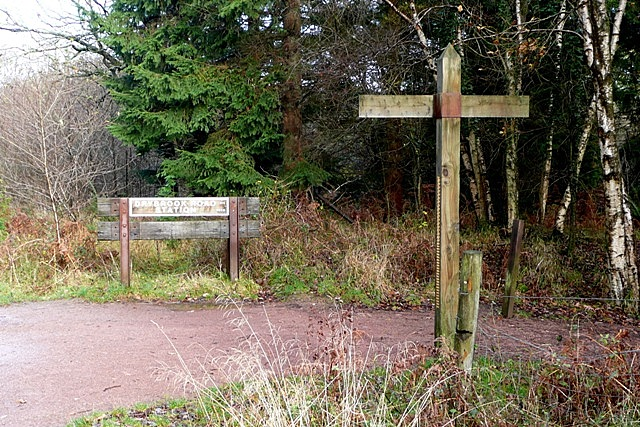
- Present day station sign in the Forest of Dean

General information
- Location: Drybrook, Forest of Dean; England
- Coordinates: 51.8279°N 2.5333°W
- Grid reference: SO633144

Other information
- Status: Disused

History
- Original company: Severn and Wye Railway
- Pre-grouping: Severn and Wye and Severn Bridge Railway
- Post-grouping: Severn and Wye and Severn Bridge Railway

Key dates
- 23 September 1875: opened
- 8 July 1929: closed
Location

Drybrook Road is a closed station on the Cinderford to Coleford direct railway line in the Forest of Dean in Gloucestershire, near the village of Drybrook. The former station was on the former Severn and Wye Railway system. It opened in 1875 and closed in 1929.

In the early 20th century the station was used to load timber from the local forest. In 1903 a coal train was involved in an accident at Drybrook.

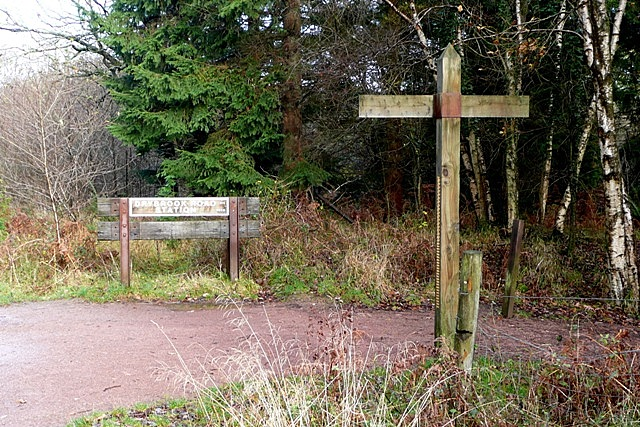
Drybrook Road station sign.

== Services ==
Preceding station	Disused railways	Following station
Serridge Platform; Line and station closed	Severn and Wye Railway	Cinderford New; Line and station closed
Serridge Platform; Line and station closed	Severn and Wye Railway	Upper Lydbrook; Line and station closed
