= Sling, Gloucestershire =

Village in Gloucestershire, England

Coordinates: 51.769°N 2.604°W

Sling
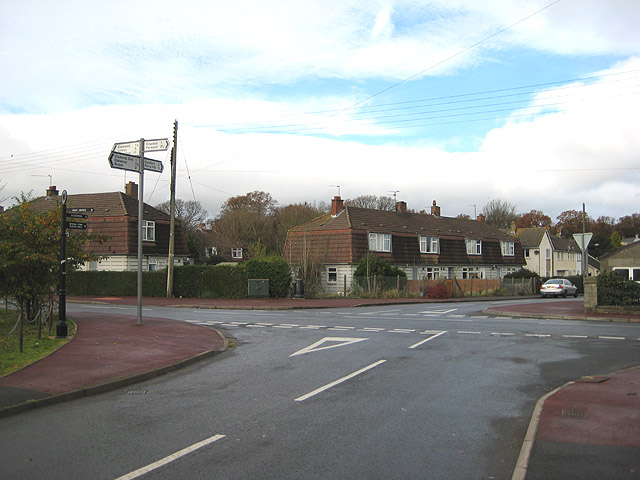

- Location within Gloucestershire
- OS grid reference: SO583079
- District: Forest of Dean
- Shire county: Gloucestershire
- Region: South West
- Country: England
- Sovereign state: United Kingdom
- Police: Gloucestershire
- Fire: Gloucestershire
- Ambulance: South Western
- UK Parliament: Forest of Dean

Sling is a village in Gloucestershire, England. The village is located between Clearwell and Bream. It is just south of the village of Milkwall.

== History ==
The hamlet of Sling derives its name from a local iron ore mine. In 1838 G. E. Jackson, a Birmingham ironmaster, sank "Old Sling" ore mine below old workings at Clearwell Meend. It was one of the larger iron ore mines in the Forest of Dean, and in the mid-1860s it employed nearly 100 people. The mine had closed by 1921.

A factory for repairing boilers, F. E. Watkins Limited, was founded at Sling in 1942, and was still operating in the late 1960s when it also made machine tools and employed around 150 people. The factory used to announce shift starts and ends using a World War 2 air raid siren until the late 1970s.

In the 18th and 19th century there were just a few scattered cottages in the area. Two of the cottages, in the fork of a road to Parkend, were later occupied by a beerhouse called the Miners' Arms. Another building nearby adopted that name by the late 1870s and remains an inn today. Several more cottages were built before the 1920s when the growth of Sling began around the crossroads formed by routes from St Briavels to Parkend and from Bream to Coleford. A memorial hall built at Sling around 1921 was superseded by a new Miners' Welfare institute in 1931. It later became a social club.
