= Lower Lydbrook railway station =

Disused railway station in Lydbrook, Gloucestershire

Coordinates: 51.8480°N 2.5867°W

Lower Lydbrook

General information
- Location: Lydbrook, Gloucestershire; England
- Platforms: 2

Other information
- Status: Disused

History
- Original company: Severn and Wye Railway
- Pre-grouping: Severn and Wye Railway

Key dates
- 23 September 1875: Opened
- 1 April 1903: Closed
Location

Lower Lydbrook railway station served the civil parish of Lydbrook, Gloucestershire, England, from 1875 to 1903 on the Severn and Wye Railway.

== History ==
The station was opened on 23 September 1875 by the Severn and Wye Railway. Access to the station was difficult because there was no access via road and passengers had to cross a steep footbridge to get to it. At the beginning of 1903, it was downgraded to an unstaffed request stop and it closed three months later on 1 April 1903.

Preceding station	Disused railways	Following station
Lydbrook Junction; Line and station closed	Severn and Wye Railway	Upper Lydbrook; Line and station closed
