= Milkwall =

Village in Gloucestershire, England

Coordinates: 51.776°N 2.604°W

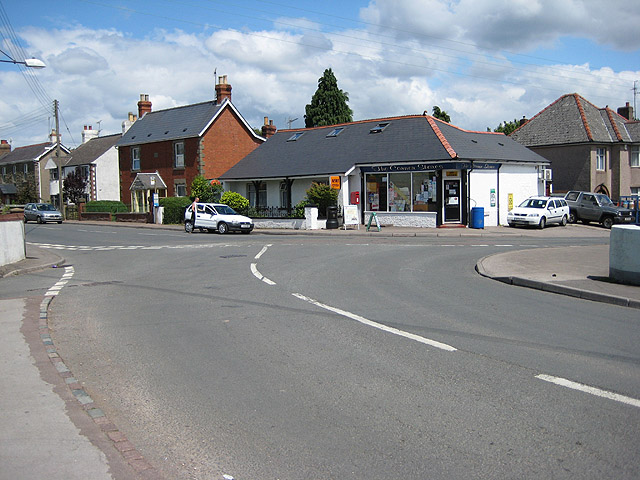

- Location within Gloucestershire
- OS grid reference: SO582092
- District: Forest of Dean
- Shire county: Gloucestershire
- Region: South West
- Country: England
- Sovereign state: United Kingdom
- Police: Gloucestershire
- Fire: Gloucestershire
- Ambulance: South Western
- UK Parliament: Forest of Dean

Milkwall is a village in the Forest of Dean in Gloucestershire, England. It lies between the village of Sling to the south, and the town of Coleford to the north. Milkwall, strictly speaking, lies South of Station Rd in the parish of West Dean, whereas Tufthorn is North of Station Rd in the parish of Coleford.

Near Milkwall is Perrygrove Railway – a private heritage railway, and Puzzlewood – an ancient woodland site.

== History ==
There was at least one dwelling at Milkwall, situated on the Forest boundary in 1628. The earliest houses at Milkwall were within the parish of Coleford with just a few houses on the extraparochial Crown land.

There was some mining in the 17th century when a drift mine was being worked at Milkwall. Mining for iron ore was taking place in the 1820s when Edward Protheroe opened up ore mines near Milkwall. In the mid-1860s, Easter, a deep mine at Milkwall, employed around 50 men and boys.

An early tramroad to serve the mines, was built by the Severn & Wye tramroad company to connect to their junction at Parkend. In 1875, the Severn & Wye constructed a railway to Coleford. It left the main line at Parkend and in places shadowed the Milkwall branch tramroad. A station was provided at Milkwall for this branch line.

The production of lime, which during the 19th century was used as flux in local ironworks as well as for farming and building, also took place in Milkwall. There were engineering works at Milkwall belonging in 1889 to Tom Morgan which continued casting metals after World War I. A colour (pigment) factory was started at Milkwall in 1926 – it employed 7 people in 1965, when in addition to processing oxides mined elsewhere it ground coal for use in the paper and fibreboard industries and in drills.

A beerhouse (later to become the Tufthorn inn) opened at Milkwall by the late-1870s. A wooden village hall was built after World War I and a recreation ground was laid out in the mid-1930s. An association football club had its own ground by the later 1950s. A social club built at Milkwall by 1959 was later enlarged.
