= Upper Lydbrook railway station =

Disused railway station in Lydbrook, Gloucestershire

Upper Lydbrook

General information
- Location: Lydbrook, Gloucestershire; England
- Coordinates: 51.8384°N 2.5757°W
- Grid reference: SO604156
- Platforms: 2

Other information
- Status: Disused

History
- Original company: Severn and Wye Railway
- Post-grouping: London, Midland and Scottish Railway

Key dates
- 23 September 1875: Opened
- 8 July 1929: Closed
Location

Upper Lydbrook railway station served the civil parish of Lydbrook, Gloucestershire, England, from 1875 to 1929 on the Severn and Wye Railway.

== History ==
The station was opened on 23 September 1875 by the Severn and Wye Railway. Behind the station was the goods yard. The layout of this was modified in 1891 to accommodate a nearby colliery that was opening. The roads nearby were modified twice to allow easier access. The station closed on 8 July 1929. The only trains after this date were excursions.

Preceding station	Disused railways	Following station
Lower Lydbrook; Line and station closed	Severn and Wye Railway	Drybrook Road; Line and station closed
