= Edward Protheroe =

British politician (1774–1856)

Edward Protheroe (1774–1856) was an English merchant, ironmaster and coal-owner in the Forest of Dean, and plantation owner in Jamaica. He served as Member of Parliament for Bristol from 1812 to 1820.

== Early life ==
He was the son of Philip Protheroe, a merchant and banker of Bristol, and his wife Mary Brain, daughter of Moses Brain who was another Bristol merchant. He was educated at Harrow School, and was admitted a fellow commoner of Magdalene College, Cambridge in 1792. He moved to Christ's College in 1793, and graduated B.A. in 1797.

== Family business ==
Edward Protheroe was the eldest son of Philip Protheroe I, who died in 1803; Sir Henry Protheroe (1777–1840), who owned land and enslaved people on Saint Vincent, and became a coal-owner in Pembrokeshire and Monmouthshire, and Philip Protheroe II (1781–1846), who had interests in numerous West Indian plantations, were younger brothers. Philip I had entered the West Indian sugar trade as apprentice to Mark Davis I, and became his partner c.1768. From 1776 he was in partnership with Mark Davis II, and Mark Davis I died in 1783, at which point Robert Claxton joined as a third partner, to form Davis, Protheroe & Claxton. Mark Davis II left the business. Edward Protheroe joined it in 1796, and the firm then traded as Protheroes and Claxton.

In 1808 Edward Protheroe left the family company. The company then split, into Robert Claxton & Son, and Protheroe & Savage, John Savage (1785–1870) being a Bristol sugar refiner who had become a partner. The latter company, under Philip Protheroe II and a cousin George Protheroe, went on to trade as Philip & George Protheroe.

== Civic Bristol ==
Protheroe served as Sheriff of Bristol, in 1797–1798. In 1804 he was President of the Anchor Society. He served as Mayor of Bristol in 1804–1805. In 1806 he laid the foundation stone of Bristol Infirmary.

== In politics ==
Protheroe stood for the Bristol constituency in the 1812 general election. Among the candidates, in the two-member constituency, were Sir Samuel Romilly, looking to escape Wareham, where John Calcraft acted as a borough-monger, and Henry Hunt. Richard Hart Davis, already in parliament for Colchester, was a Bristol merchant and banker, and a supporter of the Tory ministry, also standing for Bristol. Davis chose to ally with Protheroe as a moderate, and spent heavily at the election. Romilly had the support of the Bristol Independent Club, chaired by Robert Claxton; and Hunt the backing of William Cobbett. Hunt managed to string out the voting to 14 days, in an election marred by violence. But a number of significant supporters of Evan Baillie, the outgoing Whig member, rallied to Protheroe, who was elected behind Davis (2899 votes), with 2429 votes and ahead of Romilly on 1677. In the House of Commons he gave qualified support to William Wilberforce's abolitionist programme.

Standing again at the 1818 general election, Protheroe found he was under pressure: Hugh Duncan Baillie, son of Evan Baillie, was a candidate, and he came under attack from the reformers Edward Kentish and Thomas Stocking for failing to live up in parliament to Whig principles. He again came second to Davis. In the aftermath he quarrelled with his election committee, and did not stand again in the 1820 general election. His brother Henry published a pamphlet in 1819 giving Edward's side of the story.

== Property, the Forest of Dean and the Neath Valley ==
Philip Protheroe I left his estate to four sons and two daughters, with his son Edward receiving £20,000, and property near Bristol and at Westbury-on-Trym. Edward Protheroe in 1807 bought Over Court in Gloucestershire. It belonged to the Sitwell family of Derbyshire, who over a long period had leased it to tenants. His father had had work done on the house c.1800.

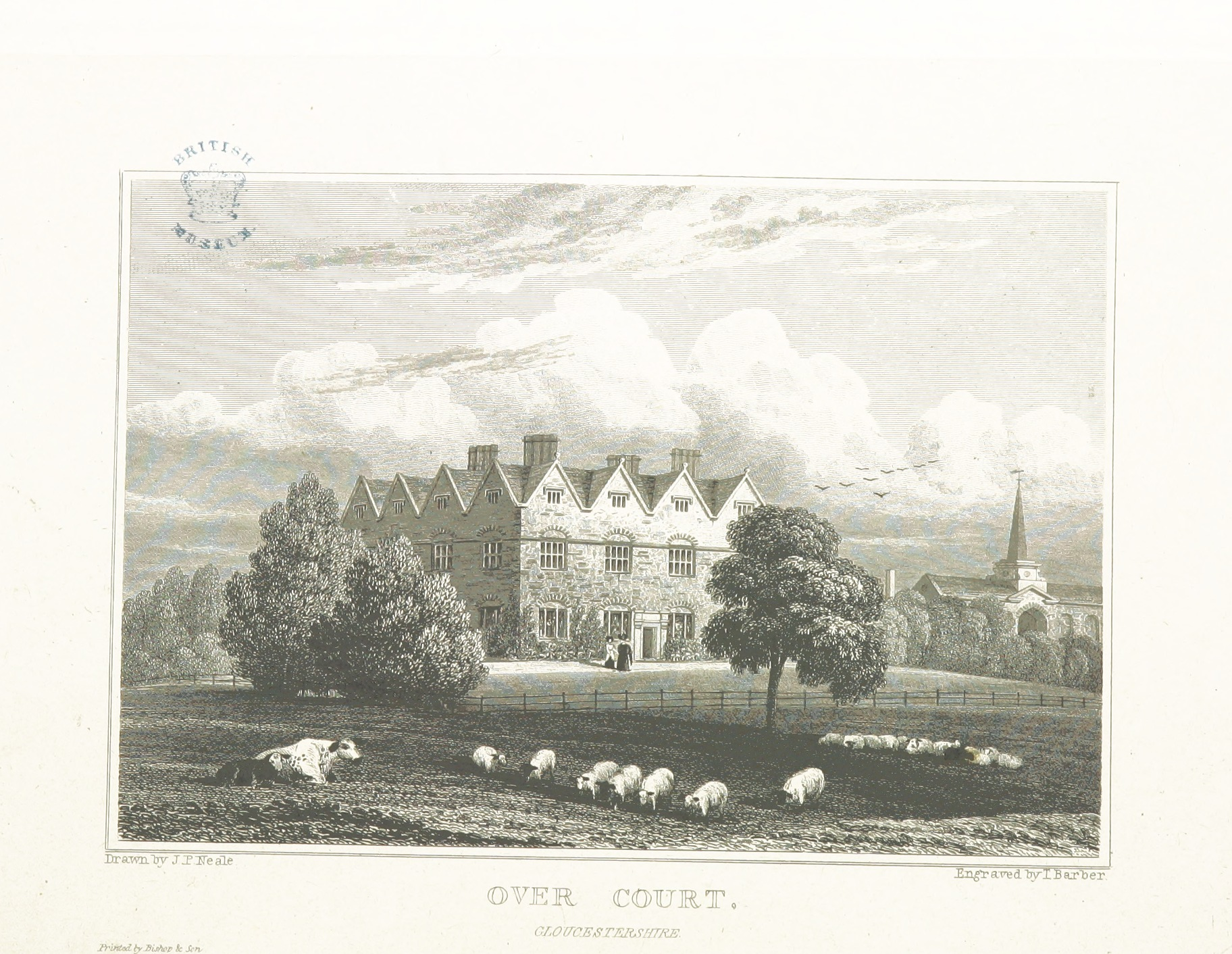
Over Court, Gloucestershire, 1824 engraving

In 1812 Protheroe made a substantial purchase of coal mines and ironworks in the Forest of Dean area, from his uncle John Protheroe. He invested in the Severn and Wye Railway. From 1821 he bought into the Thames & Severn Canal, and around 1826 he bought the Bullo Pill Railway and mines, via the Forest of Dean Railway company that he set up. He opened further collieries in the area, in 1827. Concurrently, he was developing coal mines in the Neath Valley, at Pwllfaron near Glynneath, Derlwyn Mawr, and Blaengwrach-Cwmgwrach.

== Family ==
Protheroe married in 1797 Ann Waterhouse; Edward Davis Protheroe was their son.
