= Coleford railway station (Severn and Wye Railway) =

Former railway station in England

Coleford (Severn and Wye Railway)

General information
- Location: Coleford, Forest of Dean; England
- Coordinates: 51.791712°N 2.615173°W
- Platforms: 1

Other information
- Status: Disused

History
- Original company: Severn and Wye Railway/Great Western Railway joint
- Pre-grouping: S&WR/GWR joint
- Post-grouping: S&WR/GWR joint

Key dates
- 1879: Station opened
- 1924: Station closed to passengers
Location

Coleford (Severn and Wye) railway station is one of two former stations that served the town of Coleford, Gloucestershire, England. The station was the northern terminus of the former Severn and Wye Railway.

The station opened in 1879 and was closed in 1924 to passengers due to lack of passenger use. The line remained in use for goods traffic until the line was closed from Whitecliff Quarry to Coleford in 1967.

Traces of the station have vanished under a car park but the trackbed is now a cycle track from Coleford to Parkend. The former Great Western Railway station has also vanished under a car park but the former goods shed now hosts a railway museum dedicated to the former railway lines around Coleford and the wider Forest of Dean.

== Services ==
Preceding station	Disused railways	Following station
Milkwall	Severn and Wye Railway; Later Severn and Wye Joint Railway (MR and GWR)	Terminus
