= Forest of Dean Railway =

Disused railway in England

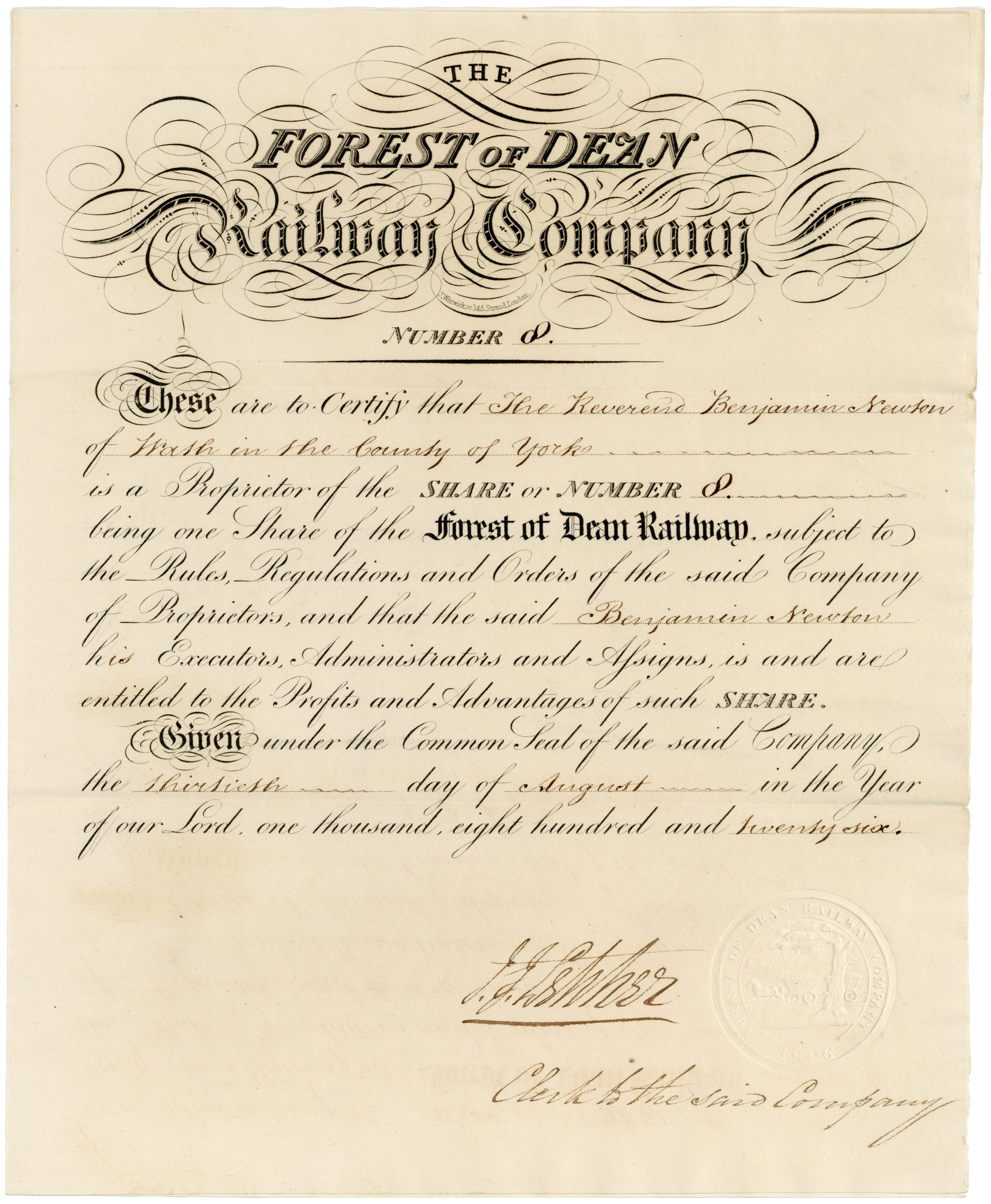
Founder share of the Forest of Dean Railway Company, issued on 30 August 1826

The Forest of Dean Railway was a railway company operating in Gloucestershire, England. It was formed in 1826 when the moribund Bullo Pill Railway and a connected private railway failed, and they were purchased by the new company. At this stage it was a horse-drawn plateway, charging a toll for private hauliers to use it with horse traction. The traffic was chiefly minerals from the Forest of Dean, in the Whimsey and Churchway areas, near modern-day Cinderford, for onward conveyance from Bullo Pill at first, and later by the Great Western Railway.

When the South Wales Railway was proposed in 1844, the FODR was awarded £15,000 to modernise its line and make a broad gauge edge railway in connection; the FODR was slow to implement this and in 1849 the South Wales Railway purchased the FODR outright, making it a branch of its own network. The line was steeply graded and difficult to work, and it was often congested due to heavy traffic.

In 1907 passenger traffic was instituted using railmotors, a low-cost means of carrying light passenger traffic, and for some time this was very successful. Trains ran from Whimsey, later extended northward to Drybridge on a contiguous line built by the GWR. Newnham was the main line junction station, although some branch trains ran through to Gloucester. As motor bus services became dominant, the passenger services became unprofitable and they were withdrawn in 1958. The network was closed completely in 1967 as mineral traffic ceased.

== First proposals for a tramroad ==
The Forest of Dean Coalfield had long been a source of mineral working, for iron ore and coal. Free Miners had statutory rights in the Forest, which protected them from external competition. However this limited the extent to which large scale operations could be undertaken. A number of short tramways were built in the Forest, but the road network was extremely difficult and transportation of mineral products to market was expensive and uncompetitive. Timber in the Forest was used for the construction of ships for the Royal Navy, and Crown Commissioners protected the forestry in a way that also impeded industrialisation of the mining.

The first railways—in fact plateways—in the Forest of Dean were designed to connect the rivers Severn and Wye, and it was not until 1806 that a serious proposal came forward to take minerals down the eastern area, southward along the Cinderford valley. That idea failed to progress, but the promoters together took land leases and announced that they would build a railway despite the setback. Work began on the line northward from Bullo Pill; no Parliamentary authority was needed as the land had been acquired.

== The Bullo Pill Railway Company ==
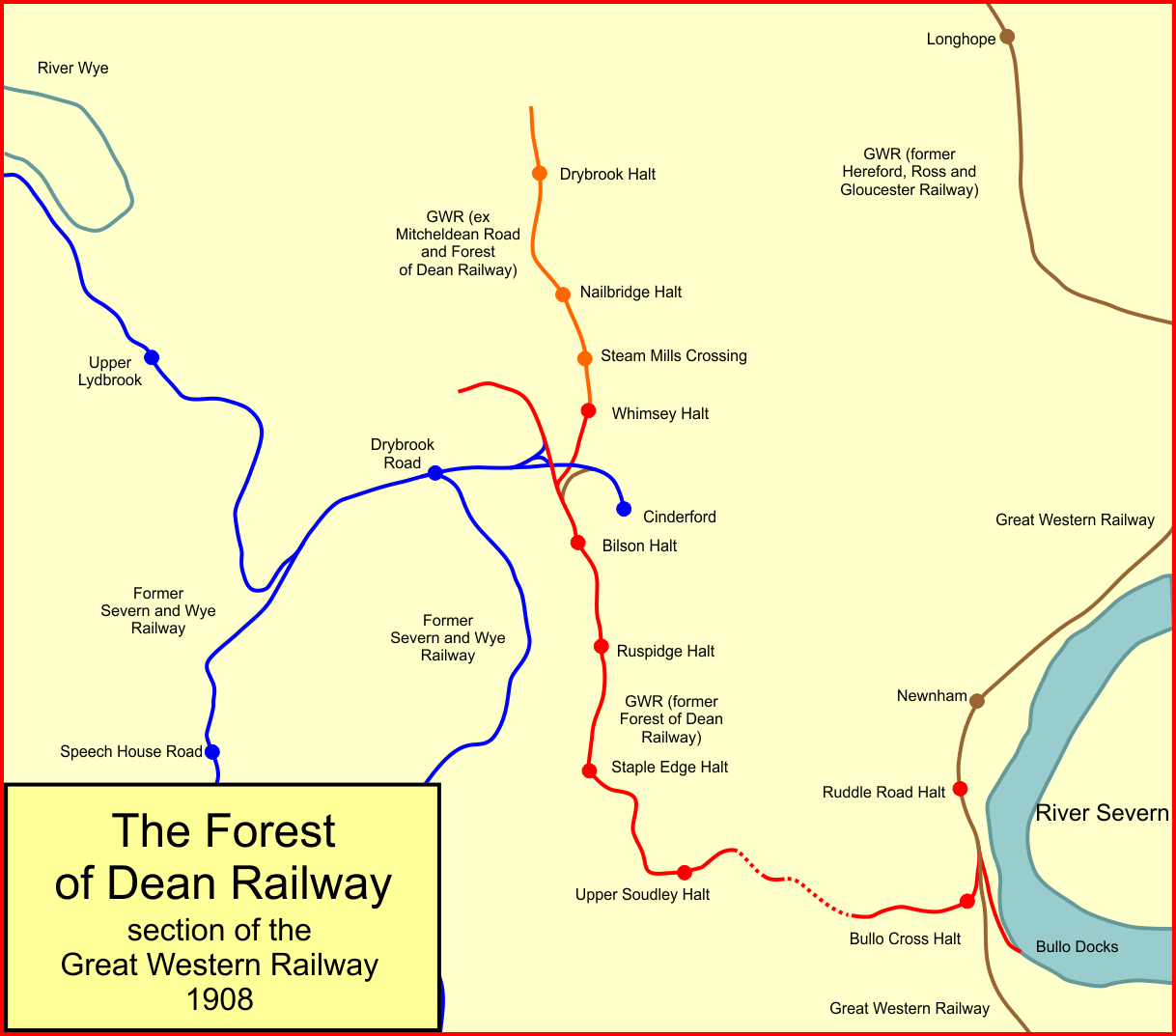
The Forest of Dean Railway network in 1908

Towards the end of 1808 a further bill was prepared to authorise a public railway or tramroad from the summit of the hill above Churchway Engine (north-west of present-day Cinderford) to Cinderford Bridge. This became the Bullo Pill Railway Act 1809 (49 Geo. 3. c. clviii) on 10 June 1809, which incorporated the Bullo Pill Railway Company. (Note: Or 5 May 1809, Carter.) There were several short branches serving mineral workings.

On 20 September 1809 a press report announced "the tunnel is completed through Hay-Hill to the Forest of Dean, which is connected with the River Severn, and a channel thus established, by which the valuable productions of the Forest may be brought to market with a feasibility hitherto unknown." The Haie tunnel, at 1,100 yards in length, was one of the earliest to be driven for a railway.

The Bullo Pill Railway was probably completed soon afterwards. The track was of the L-plate form in which plain wagons wheels could run, guided by the upstand of the L. There are uncertainties about the gauge, but four feet measured between the outer faces of the vertical flanges, is generally assumed.

The Whimsey branch was built about 1823, and Whimsey later became an important focal point for private tramroads running northwards.

== The Forest of Dean Railway takes control ==
Forest of Dean Railway Act 1826
- Act of Parliament
- Parliament of the United Kingdom
- Long title: An Act for maintaining an existing public Railway from the Summit of the Hill above Churchway Engine, in the Forest of Dean, to Cinderford Bridge, and for making public a private Railway from thence to the River Severn, at or near Bullo Pill all in the County of Gloucester; and for amending an Act of His late Majesty relating to the said Railways.
- Citation: 7 Geo. 4. c. xlvii

Dates
- Royal assent: 5 May 1826

Other legislation
- Amended by: Bullo Pill Railway Act 1809

By 1826 the Bullo Pill Railway was almost at a standstill and Edward Protheroe, a prominent coal-owner in the Parkend area and chairman of the S&WR, purchased the whole concern, including the Great Bilson colliery, selling the railway to a new company he formed, the Forest of Dean Railway Company, of which he was the chairman. The Forest of Dean Railway Act 1826 (7 Geo. 4. c. xlvii) was obtained on 5 May 1826 authorising the new company to purchase and maintain both the Bullo Pill Railway and the private line, and to make the latter public. The eighteen subscribers included Edward and three other Protheroes, and the capital was £125,000 in £50 shares. The maximum tolls were maintained over the BPR section, and tolls were laid down for the private section.

The line was in a poor state when the FODR company was formed in 1826, and it was probably then that a chaired form of track was introduced. The chairs weighed 11 lb; they had two bosses fitted into holes in the sleeper blocks, and a dovetail form seat, into which the plate was keyed with an iron wedge. These plates were still 3 feet long, and weighed about 50 lb.

In April 1833 the mild winter was blamed for a reduced demand for house coal which led to a low dividend of 13s per share. In July 1835 the shares (nominally £50) were quoted at £27, but a dividend of 13s per share was again paid. Four months later the figures were £28 and 15s respectively. By October 1837 trade was improving, and 19s per share was paid for the half year. In April 1838 a fall in trade produced a 17s dividend, but in the following year the directors noted with satisfaction how the Dean Forest (Mines) Act 1838 (1 & 2 Vict. c. 43) had stimulated mining and trading activity in the district, and in 1839 and 1840 the dividend was up to about 5%.

In October 1834 William Allaway asked the board for permission to use a locomotive on the tramroad. He enquired as to "the weight that six wheels would be allowed to carry", and he probably had in mind the six-coupled engines then being used on the Sirhowy Railway. He was told that the tramroad was not constructed for such engines, and that no "plans or proportions" had been submitted which would indicate what alterations might be necessary.

== Proposed duplication of the route ==
By 1836 the lack of a double line, and stoppages at the tunnel, were causing frequent complaints. A sub-committee was appointed and reported in October 1837 that growth in traffic would soon necessitate new provision, in particular for coastwise trade to the west. They suggested a railway from Cinderford Bridge to a new harbour at Brimspill, or Purton, and it was agreed that the chairman should write to Robert Stephenson, asking him to send a surveyor to prepare plans, "on the understanding that the chief superintendence of the undertaking will be entrusted to him, Mr Stephenson".

His report was read to the board on 12 April 1838. He stated that Brimspill was the natural outlet for that portion of the Forest. The new branch was to be 5 miles 68 chains long, and he estimated that the cost, including locomotives, other power and a stock of wagons, would be £40,000. The Crown authorities had approved the line, and it was hoped that iron, iron ore, and coal would be exported from the new harbour, while Bullo harbour would be retained for the existing trade. Stephenson's bill for the survey was £267 8s.

A Bill was introduced into Parliament for the new line from Cinderford Bridge, passing through two tunnels, and touching the village of Blakeney on the way to Brimspill. However the Bill was thrown out for failing to comply with standing orders; some buildings had been omitted from the plans and there was a discrepancy in the datum levels. The chairman, Protheroe, immediately wrote to Stephenson, but he was abroad and George Parker Bidder replied. Bidder could only plead the difficulty of complying with the new and complicated standing orders, and dismissed a 12 feet inaccuracy in a level as "purely clerical ... not significant". The company decided to re-apply for an act of Parliament, but the idea was overtaken by the idea of main line railways in the area.

== The South Wales Railway ==
The South Wales Railway was proposed in 1844, encouraged by the Great Western Railway; it was to run from Standish, south-east of Gloucester, to South Wales. There would have been a bridge across the Severn at Fretherne. However it was argued by opponents that this would impede shipping intending to reach Bullo Pill, and to avoid the opposition the promoters of the South Wales Railway agreed to purchase the Forest of Dean Railway for £30,000 and improve it, providing a new branch line to the Severn at Brimspill.

In the event, for unconnected reasons the South Wales Railway Act 1845 (8 & 9 Vict. c. cxc) authorised only the section westward from Chepstow, and the crossing of the Severn was omitted. Nevertheless, the South Wales Railway proprietors confirmed on 31 October 1845 the agreement for conditional purchase of the Forest of Dean Railway, the chairman stating that the cost would be £101,000.

The South Wales Railway introduced another Bill in 1847, seeking powers to convert the Forest of Dean Railway line to a broad gauge railway, but this was opposed by the Severn and Wye Railway on the grounds that the different gauge would prevent the interchange of traffic at Churchway. Daniel Gooch, for the SWR, agreed that they could preserve the tramroad down to Findall Mine level, near the tunnel, to meet S&WR objections to a break of gauge at Churchway. The South Wales Railway Amendment Act 1847 (10 & 11 Vict. c. cix) was passed on 2 July 1847, and the SWR was authorised to rent or purchase the FODR and to divert, widen and improve it, constructing a locomotive railway. The branch to Bullo Pill was to pass under the South Wales line, permitting direct traffic to the docks, with a spur to the main line.

== Acquisition of the Forest of Dean Railway ==
Isambard Kingdom Brunel, as engineer of the South Wales Railway, was not satisfied with the proposed conversion because of the steep gradients involved and the uncertainty as to whether the line might continue to be worked by horses. The South Wales Railway had priorities elsewhere, and the purchase and conversion by them was left in abeyance. The FODR meanwhile, with the promise of their concern being purchased, suspended any expenditure on maintenance or repairs.

This enabled the FODR to enhance its profits: in 1848 the FODR paid a dividend of 8%, but in September 1849 Brunel reported an interview with local traders, who "feared the trade would be seriously inconvenienced if not actually stopped, unless arrangements were made to keep the line in repair". The South Wales Railway board then authorised its solicitors to guarantee the average cost of one month's repair of the FODR. The following month it was reported that a bill had been filed by the FODR to enforce performance of the agreement, and the South Wales Railway thereupon requested Brunel to negotiate some arrangement with the FODR. On 7 November 1849 the South Wales Railway agreed to purchase the FODR for £90,000, to be paid on 27 January 1853. The South Wales Railway was considered to be in possession from 27 July 1849.

The South Wales Railway New Works Act 1851 (14 & 15 Vict. c. lii) was dated 3 July 1851, and it authorised the construction of a single-line broad-gauge locomotive railway from Churchway Engine and Whimsey to the main line (using parts of the tramroad), and a new wharves branch at Bullo; this was in substitution for the 1847 act. The South Wales Railway opened its line from near Gloucester to a temporary station at Chepstow East on 19 September 1851.

Brunel reported on 25 February 1852 that the contract for the enlargement of the FODR tunnel and the construction of another through Blakeney Hill, was to be let during the month. The final meeting of the FODR Company took place in London on Friday 10 September 1852. In February 1853 the conversion work was going ahead, but the enlargement of the tunnel was proving difficult, especially as the heavy winter coal traffic on the line had to be maintained during the work.

By February 1854 the operation of enlarging the old tunnel had been completed. The railway to Churchway and Whimsey, with the dock branch, was opened for coal traffic on Monday 24 July 1854, as a broad gauge branch of the South Wales Railway. The work had cost £120,000; the line was 7 miles 20 chains long, and the Bullo dock branch was 53 chains long. For some time to come Whimsey was regarded as the centre of the traffic activity on the line; Cinderford as a community had not yet developed significantly.

== Operation as a broad gauge railway ==
The broad-gauge railway was primarily intended to take the products of the Forest out of the district, but there was a large traffic between the works (principally iron-ore from the Parkend district, and coal from Wimberry, to the eastern furnaces) and several of the pits had only tramroad connections. The S&WR board agreed on 26 May 1854 to keep the tramroad open from the junction with the Lightmoor branch to Churchway and Whimsey "for the present", and the east–west traffic continued on the tramroad throughout until an interchange wharf was put in at Churchway. There loaded tram wagons were placed on broad-gauge flat wagons by turntable, for onward transit to Cinderford ironworks.

The steep gradients and the large number of sidings made operation of the former FODR network unusually difficult. The ruling gradient on the main stem was 1 in 48 near Upper Soudley, and 1 in 41 on the Churchway branch.

A former station master at Bullo Pill recounted the operations:

The single engine stationed at the junction did all the branch work and shunting and, north of Bilson, its duties included taking three empty wagons to Nelson colliery and collecting three laden ones, fetching wire from Churchway (whence it had been brought by tramroad from Lydbrook works), and carrying Edge Hill iron-ore from Whimsey (for Dowlais works). Coal traffic, averaging 40 wagons daily, was generally taken down to Bullo sidings in the afternoon, and on to Swindon next morning by two trains. Some 30 trucks of pig-iron, from Cinderford and Soudley, were brought down in the morning. No brake vans were used, and the three guards in charge of the trains rode on the tops of the wagons. The opening of Trafalgar, Foxes Bridge, East Slade and Stapledge collieries led to a down-going traffic of nearly 100 wagons.

The account recalls an instance when, a train of 99 wagons having been made up at Bilson, the yard was vainly searched for one more, and the guard had to leave with only ‘99 on’, to his great disappointment. This gross overloading led to an event in the autumn of 1863, when a train of 70 wagons broke in two near Shakemantle. On discovering the shortage, the driver stopped below Shakemantle siding, whereupon the 30 truant wagons ran into the train, creating a confusion of wreckage which took five days to clear. It also led to the limiting of trains to 45 wagons and the employment of a third locomotive, so that four trains a day could be worked down. Traffic continued to increase, and on most days a wire had to be sent to Gloucester for two special engines to clear Bullo yard. Occasionally, a train would take wagons to Grange Court, the guard riding on the last truck carrying a red flag and a supply of detonators. Later, broad-gauge trains were despatched in the evening to Salisbury via Swindon, avoiding the wait through the night at Bullo.

In 1867 traffic was worked by train staff and ticket, on weekdays only (always the practice), with a guard to every 15 wagons. Four locomotives were based at Bullo Pill and were respectively referred to as the Bullo Yard engine (which worked the docks branch), the Branch engine (which worked up to Bilson), the Forest engine (which worked north of Bilson, and returned to Bullo with the last train), and the spare engine.

Public goods stations were originally provided at Ruspidge and Whimsey, the former being called "Cinderford", from the settlement around Cinderford Bridge. A GWR circular of 26 November 1884 stated "It has been arranged to open the new goods station for Cinderford, which is situated at the Whimsey sidings on the Forest of Dean branch, on the 1st December and to call it 'Cinderford' instead of Whimsey. On and from the same date the present Cinderford station will be called 'Ruspidge'."

A public goods station was opened at Bilson in August 1862. In 1867 the Forest engine worked three trips for coal from Churchway and one ore trip from Whimsey, to Bilson. The branch engine worked seven trips down to Bullo Pill Jen, one a pick-up goods; there was also a short working down to Quidchurch to fetch ore back to Bilson, and a late trip if required leaving Bilson at 6.0 p.m. There were balancing workings, including two pick-ups which called at the various sidings as required; the journey time for a through train down from Bilson was usually 20 minutes (25 in the opposite direction), while the pick-ups were allowed one hour in each direction.

E Fletcher, the local traffic superintendent, stated in 1869 that about 1,500 tons passed down the branch daily, beginning early in the morning, but work ceased early in the afternoon "for want of sufficient traffic". He also mentioned that some of the collieries served—Churchway, Quidchurch, Spero, Bilson, Prospect, Winnings, Cinderford Bridge, Woodside and Paragon—had ceased work after the broad gauge line had been completed.

== Conversion to standard gauge ==
The Great Western Railway, as successor to the South Wales Railway from 1863, converted the gauge of the South Wales Railway line during the weekend of 11 and 12 May 1872. The former FODR line was converted at the same time.

On 15 September 1873 the triangular junction with the S&WR at Bilson Junction was opened for traffic. Brain's Tramway crossed both S&WR and GWR lines at the same point and the GWR erected a disc-and-crossbar signal which became famous as the last survivor of its type.

== Operation in 1895 ==
In 1895, the FODR main line was worked by train staff and ticket, supplemented by telegraph, in two sections, Bullo to Ruspidge and Ruspidge to Bilson. Due to the steep gradient, up trains were limited to 40 loaded wagons by day, 30 by night, reduced in bad weather, and had to stop at Ruspidge for pinning down of wagon brakes. They had to be drawn down the bank at not more than 10 mph, and no train of more than 20 wagons (or 25 with two engines) was to leave Ruspidge for Bullo unless the line was signalled clear all the way through, which could not be done within 25 minutes of any up passenger train being due on the main line.

The Churchway branch was worked by the Bilson shunting engine, as was the Whimsey branch, which at that time extended to Speedwell siding.

In the 1895 regulations, it was explained that at the level crossing with the Lightmoor colliery line, signals were provided for both lines, but the signalman had no communication along the line, and the crossing signals were not interlocked. "Mr Crawshay’s Engine Driver" was to maintain only such a speed as will enable him to pull up with certainty clear of the crossing, and every instance of his failing to do this must be reported by the signalman.

== Whimsey ==
When the broad gauge railway was completed and opened in 1854, Whimsey was one of the two northernmost points, the other being Churchway. The line terminated alongside Whimsey Colliery; however, this appears to have closed soon afterwards and it seems that most of the railway traffic originating here in the early days came from elsewhere. The original FODR tramroad from Bullo Pill had also terminated at Whimsey until it was extended by private tramroads to Nailbridge in 1834, and to Westbury Brook Iron Mine in 1842.

A northward extension from Whimsey to Speedwell siding was opened for mineral traffic in July 1885.

== Cinderford ==
The Severn and Wye Railway only reached a Cinderford station that was some distance from the settlement itself, and for many years this was a source of complaint. On 2 July 1900 an extension was at last made to a new Cinderford station, but no connection was made with the FODR line until 6 April 1908, when a 31-chain loop was brought into use, from Bilson Junction to Cinderford Junction; the disparity of levels was such that the connection rose towards Cinderford at 1 in 51. The GWR had asked for the junction in July 1907, offering to contribute to the cost of the station, and its expenses, in the ratio that GWR trains bore to the total number using it, two GWR "motor-car" units to be equivalent to one conventional S&WR train. (Note: The GWR had a half share of the Severn and Wye Company at that time; the other partner was the Midland Railway. The S&WR network kept separate accounts and the toll charge was therefore necessary.) The loop was authorised by the Great Western Railway (General Powers) Act 1909 (9 Edw. 7. c. lxxxiv) of 16 August 1909, and was used for many years by passenger trains only.

The Cinderford station was constructed on a lavish scale, and experience showed that its running cost was more than the income from the station supported. As early as May 1927 the station signal box at Cinderford (S&WR) was taken out of use, and in 1929 the S&WR passenger trains were withdrawn. A limited S&WR goods service continued until 25 July 1949, and the track was severed in 1951. In 1958, the FODR auto-trains were discontinued, and the station was closed to local parcels traffic as from 1 November 1962, although it remained in use for goods traffic.

The opening of Northern United colliery in 1935 produced new instructions for working the Churchway section. Loaded trains were limited to 40 ten-ton wagons or equivalent (soon amended to 35) throughout down to Bullo, while upgoing empties were limited to 23 as far as Bilson, and 15 on the Churchway branch. They were to be propelled up to the colliery from Bilson, with a brake van leading, the open end at the head, and the guard warning anyone on the line by means of a horn.

== Passenger traffic ==
The Bullo Pill Railway and its successor, the Forest of Dean Railway, were never seriously planned for passenger operation, although the possibility had been mentioned more than once.

By 1904 motor bus services in country districts began to be a real cause of competition for the railway. The GWR was seeking methods of catering economically for light passenger traffic, using steam railcars. These consisted of a passenger coach into which was built a four-wheeled steam locomotive, duplicate driving controls being provided at the opposite end from the locomotive. The very limited power of the small traction unit was always an issue, and on the steeply graded Forest of Dean Railway section it proved impracticable. Instead higher capacity units known as auto-trains, consisting of a tank locomotive coupled to one or two coaches were used. The coach remote from the locomotive had driving controls and a mechanical linkage enabled the driver to operate the locomotive regulator. Some configurations marshalled an intermediate trailer between the driving trailer and the locomotive, and in the extreme this could be done both ends of the locomotive, giving four passenger coaches.

On 1 November 1906, £14,956 was authorised for the "adaption of mineral lines in the Forest of Dean for passenger traffic". Work proceeded quickly with the construction of halts at Bullo Cross, Upper Soudley, Staple Edge, Bilson, Whimsey and Steam Mills.

The service was instituted on 3 August 1907, from Newnham to Steam Mills Crossing, with the intention of extending it to Drybrook, and to Cinderford (S&WJR). Five services were operated on weekdays, taking 29 minutes down to Newnham and 30 minutes on return. A short run was made from Bilson to Steam Mills and back early in the morning, and on Saturday there was a late evening service from Newnham to Whimsey. Halts were provided at Ruddle Road (on the main line), Bullo Cross, Upper Soudley, Staple Edge, Ruspidge, Bilson (Cinderford), Whimsey, and Steam Mills, and in the first six weeks’ working 20,824 passengers were conveyed, including 3,319 on August Bank Holiday. The patronage was far beyond the expectation of the promoters.

On 4 November 1907 the service was extended to Drybrook halt via Nailbridge halt, the basic service being six journeys each way, with extra short runs from Bilson to Drybrook, and Drybrook to Whimsey. On 6 April 1908 the Cinderford Loop was opened and the trains were extended to Cinderford station, from where they reversed back to Bilson Junction signal box before completing their journey. In November the platforms at Bullo Cross, Upper Soudley, Staple Edge, Nailbridge and Drybrook were raised from 1 ft 2 in. to 3 ft in height.

Workmen's cars were introduced on 4 January 1909 to convey colliers between Drybrook and Whimsey and Bilson halts, but notices dated July 1909 and subsequently make no reference to the Bilson halt which had, in fact, been closed from 6 April 1908. In June 1910, five hundred men from Lightmoor Colliery travelled to Blackpool (via Grange Court, Hereford, Crewe, Manchester and Wigan). Bilson was re-opened from 2 April 1917 and closed again from 1 October 1920, but unadvertised use was made of it in later years and it appeared in official timetable alterations in March 1930. It was finally removed in 1944. Ruddle Road halt, although on the main line a little south of Newnham, was served only by the branch trains. It was closed on 29 April 1917, due to disappointing patronage.

On 28 September 1910 the Board of Trade belatedly authorised the use of the branch for passenger traffic by means of "motor cars", also for excursion trains run between Cinderford and the main line, provided these did not call at the halts. By 1913 certain trains were running to and from Gloucester, and one had been extended to Grange Court, a pattern which was continued throughout the service, with Newnham bay platform becoming used less as more trains were extended to Gloucester.

The service between Cinderford and Drybrook was withdrawn from 7 July 1930, the last trip being on Saturday 5 July, whilst in December 1932 a Saturdays-only evening train from Cinderford to Gloucester was worked without a guard as an economy measure. The method of working in 1952 was thus: the auto set left Lydney at 7.20 a.m. for Grange Court, running thence to Cinderford (arrive 8.45) and leaving for Gloucester at 9.0 (arrive 9.43). The auto made two further trips to Cinderford and back, and on Saturdays only there were two evening trips each way between Cinderford and Gloucester, and an afternoon short working between Cinderford and Newnham only, connecting there with main-line trains. The stock was worked back to Lydney during the week as the 5.30 p.m. auto from Gloucester, but as empty stock on Saturday. The passenger service was withdrawn on and from 3 November 1958; the last run was on Saturday 1 November 1958.

No normal passenger trains were ever operated (apart from occasional excursions), and the auto-trains handled all the traffic.

== After 1918 ==
By the late 1920s the sheer volume of traffic in the movement of coal, and the corresponding flow of empty wagons, had created serious problems on the branch once again, this time complicated by the passenger service. Eastern United Colliery was in a fairly cramped position and had limited siding space, which required regular clearance, especially during the winter when the colliery was at full output. During the summer there was the problem of loaded wagons of coal awaiting orders. With such limited siding space, the colliery could not hold them and the GWR soon filled any available siding accommodation to capacity.

The output from both Eastern and Northern United Collieries kept the Forest of Dean branch very busy, but the somewhat restricted accommodation at Bullo Junction was critical. About 1932, additional loops were provided, but at the same time it was proposed to demolish the engine shed, extend the siding through it and extend the adjoining siding to provide accommodation for a further fifty wagons.

Despite the problems in coping with the output of the two new collieries at Eastern and Northern United, other traffic was in decline. Passengers were increasingly attracted to the more convenient motor bus services, and other collieries and industries were dwindling. Ruddle Road Halt had been closed on 29 April 1917 and Bilson Halt was closed again from 1 October 1920 although it reappeared in later timetables. The rest of the decade saw further economies in the face of increasing competition from motor buses in the Forest. On 17 May 1927 Cinderford signal box was closed, the signals taken out of use, and the line from Cinderford Junction to the terminus was worked on the one engine in steam principle.

== Closure ==
Drybrook Quarries were closed and the branch from Whimsey ceased to function in February 1953. The section from Churchway sidings, back to Bilson, closed on 28 December 1965, and the rest of the line, back to Bullo Pill, closed to freight on 3 August 1967. The Bullo Pill Docks line closed on 12 August 1963.

== Topography ==
=== Main line ===
Leaving the South Wales line at Bullo Pill West box (considered to be the zero point for mileages), and crossing the main road, Bullo Cross halt (32 chains) was on the down side, after which the line climbed to Hay Hill tunnel (1,064 yards). Less than 300 yards separated Soudley tunnel from Bradley Hill tunnel (299 yd) and beyond, on the up side, was a gated spur, Soudley siding, serving a small wharf by the road. Upper Soudley halt (2 m 17 ch) was on the up side. The line made a sharp turn northward at Scilly Point, and an early siding of that name served Findall iron-mine. Blue Rock tunnel (109 yards) followed, after which came Shakemantle siding, established by 1856 on the up side. This served the iron mine, and later the great limestone and dolomite quarries. The quarries had no road access as late as 1936, but for some years the siding, still partly laid with old broad-gauge bridge rail, was derelict.

At the northern Shakemantle connection a short siding on the down side, Quidchurch, served a wharf on which a tramway incline (probably rope-worked) from Quidchurch colliery terminated. Another curve, under a road bridge, brought the line to Eastern United colliery, near the site of Staple Edge brickworks, themselves served by sidings existing in 1856. The colliery sidings diverged from the passing loop, on the up side of which was Staple Edge halt (3 m 26 ch). The loop was opened on 14 December 1913 to serve the new colliery. Later, two sidings were added on the up side, for additional wagon storage, but they were probably never used and they were later removed. A small siding at Meerbrook was laid by 1878, on the down side, serving a tramroad spur from Staple Edge quarry.

At Cinderford Bridge the Speech House road was crossed on the level, with Ruspidge Halt (4 m 5 ch) immediately beyond on the down side. On the up side a single siding served the old goods shed. In 1925 an existing disused siding was extended to form a loop leading to two new sidings for obtaining ballast from the ironworks slag-tip. The replacement was lifted in 1939 but, long before, a short branch, built with the broad-gauge line but lifted after a few years, crossed the brook by a 3-arch stone bridge to Cinderford Bridge colliery.

Passing Cinderford ironworks site on the up side, there was Bilson Ballast siding, used as a runaway siding in 1895, the points for it being set by hand, unless a train was passing. Beyond this was the Lightmoor Colliery Railway ironworks branch and, adjacent on the up side, was Bilson halt. The colliery railway on the down side, with a loop siding, ran under Letcher's Bridge which, until 1929, carried the Crump Meadow tramroad. Bilson Yard (4 m 74 ch) had three long tracks giving access to the Churchway branch, with a separate line on the up side, which divided to form the Whimsey and Cinderford station branches.

There were other sidings for the Crump Meadow and Foxes Bridge collieries, the goods shed, and the Trafalgar colliery tramway, together with a spur off the Cinderford line, used as a rail- motor lay-by.

=== The Whimsey branch ===
The Cinderford line followed a sharp curve, past the site of Cinderford Junction (5 m 27 ch), to Cinderford station, formerly S&WR property. The Whimsey branch passed under the S&WR line, by the site of the Dam Pool, a relic of Cinderford ironworks; adjacent, on the up side, was a broad-gauge siding, probably called Spero.

On the down side again Broadmoor brickworks and Duck colliery (5 m 40 ch) were served by sidings until post-war years, and beyond was Whimsey Halt, opposite which, on the up side, was a short-lived broad gauge branch to Regulator Colliery. Whimsey goods station (5 m 60 ch), renamed Cinderford Goods in 1884, was on the up side. Behind it was a large sawmill, once served by a siding, and Berry, Wiggins & Co.'s depot, established in 1949 for transferring bitumen from rail tanks to road tankers. On the down side was Dowlais siding, with the wharf on which the tramroad from Edge Hill terminated.

Whimsey was the terminus of the branch from 1854 until the Mitcheldean Road line was built. The Mitcheldean Road and Forest of Dean Railway was authorised but ran out of money before completing construction, and it was acquired by the GWR. The GWR completed the construction but left it unused for some years, after which they opened the section from Whimsey to Speedwell sidings (6 m 63 ch) in July 1885. The extension to Drybridge followed in 1907 - 1908 on the introduction of passenger railmotors.

The continuation of the line was therefore a GWR construction, in adoption of the Mitcheldean Road and Forest of Dean Railway route. Steam Mills halt was on the up side beyond a level crossing, after which came a shallow embankment, a bridge across the tramroad, an unusual joint bridge taking the Trafalgar tramway and the railway under a road, a skew girder bridge across the tramway, and Nailbridge halt (up side). Immediately beyond the halt was a bridge carrying the Drybrook road, followed by Speedwell siding, a loop to the running line, serving the Speedwell Newbridge level. Though officially closed in 1897, activity continued thereafter and the siding connections were not finally taken out of use until 6 January 1938.

=== From Bilson Junction to Churchway ===
The FODR line continued northward to Churchway: the New Bowson Deep Coal Company had a siding, licensed in 1868, but this fell out of use and in 1925 Bowson N & S ground frames were opened, traffic being taken up to Churchway for running round, before continuing to Bilson.

Brickworks siding, on the up side, was put in to serve the small Hawkwell tinplate works, established in 1879 in connection with the existing Hawkwell colliery. In 1937 Brickworks siding (5 m 67 ch) was brought into use. The Northern United colliery was opened in 1935, when two ground frames were brought into use on the up side, one near Brickworks siding controlling outwards traffic and the other, nearer the branch terminus, controlling inwards empties. The private sidings, gravity-worked, covered part of the Hawkwell railway route, and further on crossed the site of East Slade colliery sidings which existed in 1856 but fell out of use, with the colliery, in about 1905. The terminus of the Churchway branch was a short loop; a private siding, long out of use, served the Nelson colliery and brickyard.

== Location list ==
=== Newnham to Whimsey ===
- Newnham; station on main line;
- Ruddle Road Halt; on main line but served only by branch line trains; opened 3 August 1907; closed 30 April 1917;
- Bullo Pill Junction;
- Bullo Cross Halt; opened 3 August 1907; closed 3 November 1958;
- Haie Hill Tunnel; 1,065 yards; called Bullo Tunnel by Cooke;
- Bradley Hill Tunnel; 299 yards;
- Upper Soudley Halt; opened 3 August 1907; closed 3 November 1958;
- Blue Rock Tunnel; 109 yards;
- Staple Edge Halt; opened 3 August 1907; closed 3 November 1958;
- Ruspidge Halt; opened 3 August 1907; closed 3 November 1958;
- Bilson Halt; opened 3 August 1907; closed 6 April 1908 except for miners' trains; reopened 2 April 1917; closed 1 October 1920 although miners' trains continued until 1930;
- Bilson Loop Junction; also known as Cinderford Junction;
- Whimsey Junction;
- Whimsey Halt; opened 4 November 1907; closed 7 July 1930;
- from here former Mitcheldean Road and Forest of Dean Railway route, built by Great Western Railway;
- Steam Mills Crossing; opened 3 August 1907; closed 7 July 1930
- Nailbridge Halt; opened 4 November 1907; closed 7 July 1930;
- Drybrook Halt; opened 4 November 1907; closed 7 July 1930.

=== Whimsey Junction to Churchway ===
- Whimsey Junction; above;
- Bilson South Junction;
- Bilson North Junction;
- Churchway.
