= Bullo Pill Railway =

Overview
- Status: Closed
- Locale: Gloucestershire

Service
- Type: Heavy rail
- Operator(s): Bullo Pill Railway, Great Western Railway, British Railways

History
- Opened: 1810
- Closed: 1967

Technical
- Track gauge: 4 ft 8 1/2 in (1,435 mm)
- Old gauge: 4 ft (1,219 mm); 7 ft 1/4 in (2,140 mm)

The Bullo Pill Railway was an early British railway, completed in 1810 to carry coal mined in the Forest of Dean Coalfield to a port on the River Severn near Newnham, Gloucestershire. It was later converted to a broad gauge steam line by the Great Western Railway, and was closed in the 1960s.

== Background ==
The Forest of Dean has been exploited since ancient times, not merely for its timber, but also for the minerals beneath. All the ingredients for iron-making exist and have been used since the Roman period. The Industrial Revolution brought increased demand for coal and iron, but the Forest, while having both in abundance, was at a disadvantage, being isolated from its potential markets with only a few frequently impassable roads linking it to the outside world. The hilly terrain was unsuitable for the canals of the type which were being built elsewhere, but in the first decade of the nineteenth century plans were laid for a number of horse-drawn railways to carry goods cheaply to the Rivers Severn and Wye.

== Development ==
Bullo Pill, on the Severn near Newnham, originally a small tidal creek off the main river used for boat building, was developed by building a dock basin with lock gates, and wharfs for loading goods for shipment. Coal and stone from the Forest could be loaded at the dock and exported on the Severn trows up or down the river. In addition there was a flow of barges carrying coal across the river to Framilode and then along the Stroudwater Canal to Brimscombe, Stroud and Chalford.

Bullo Pill Railway Act 1809
- Act of Parliament
- Parliament of the United Kingdom
- Long title: An Act for making and maintaining a Railway or Tram Road from the Summit of the Hill above Churchway Engine, in the Forest of Dean in the County of Gloucester, to a certain Place in the said Forest called Cinderford Bridge.
- Citation: 49 Geo. 3. c. clviii

Dates
- Royal assent: 10 June 1809

Text of statute as originally enacted

A private railway was built from Bullo Pill to Cinderford Bridge, a distance of nearly four and a half miles; when it was nearly complete, the Bullo Pill Railway Company applied for an act of Parliament in order to extend the railway a further two miles to the summit of the hill above Churchway Engine, and to make branches. Royal assent to the Bullo Pill Railway Act 1809 (49 Geo. 3. c. clviii) was given on 10 June 1809.

The railway was of approximately 4 ft gauge, laid as a plateway, with rails of L-shaped section, spiked to stone blocks. Rails were supplied by the Ayleford Foundry, near Soudley; a branch line was constructed from the foundry. All traffic was horse-drawn, using privately owned four-wheeled wagons of an approved type, with an oak underframe supporting a hopper-shaped body, and with unflanged cast-iron wheels. The line was single, with frequent passing loops.

The tunnel at Haie (or Hay) Hill was 1,083 yards long, completed in 1810; at the time it was the longest railway tunnel in the world.

From Bullo Pill the line heads west for a mile to the entrance of Haie Hill Tunnel; emerging at the far end at Lower Soudley. From there, it follows the Cinderford valley northward through Upper Soudley, Cinderford Bridge and Bilson to Churchway.

In 1811–12 there was an attempt to excavate a tunnel under the River Severn, apparently as an extension to the railway. The tunnel began on the bank between Bullo Pill and Newnham, and was intended to emerge on the far side near Arlingham. The tunnel had been extended 226 yards out, about halfway, but an inrush of water in November 1812 meant work was abandoned.

In 1812 the Severn and Wye Railway line was extended to meet the Bullo Pill Railway at Churchway, but there seems initially to have been little traffic passing between the two.

== The Forest of Dean Railway ==
By 1815, Bullo Pill was shipping up to 1,000 tons of coal and stone daily, but the end of the Napoleonic Wars brought about a recession, and by the 1820s the railway was a shadow of its former self. It was bought by Edward Protheroe, who introduced plans to revitalize it. A second act of Parliament, the Forest of Dean Railway Act 1826 (7 Geo. 4. c. xlvii) received royal assent on 5 May 1826; this turned the line into a public company, renamed the Forest of Dean Railway Company.

== Industry ==
The coming of the railway stimulated industry along its length, connected by sidings or short branches to the main line. There were collieries at Bilson, Crump Meadow, Churchway, Quidchurch, Foxes Bridge and numerous other locations, iron mines at Buckshaft, Shakemantle and St Annals, and stone quarries at Shakemantle and Staple Edge. Two major ironworks operated close to the railway at Cinderford and Soudley. Other industries included brickworks, chemical works, tinplate works and timber yards.

== Broad gauge conversion ==
The South Wales Railway (a subsidiary of the Great Western Railway) bought the Forest of Dean Railway in 1849; their main line was opened in 1851 between Gloucester and Chepstow, and sidings were built at Bullo Pill for transfer of goods.

The Forest of Dean line was surveyed by Isambard Kingdom Brunel in 1851 with a view to constructing a single-track broad gauge (7 ft 0¼ in) steam railway from the main line up to Churchway, with a branch to Whimsey. Although it approximately followed the line of the earlier railway, it was more heavily engineered with embankments, cuttings and tunnels, which tended to straighten out the earlier somewhat meandering course. Haie Hill Tunnel was enlarged, and new tunnels were dug at Bradley Hill (299 yards) and Blue Rock (109 yards). The new line, seven and a quarter miles long, opened on 24 July 1854. The South Wales Railway was officially amalgamated with the Great Western Railway on 1 August 1863. The line was converted to standard gauge in 1872.

In 1871 the Mitcheldean Road & Forest of Dean Junction Railway was formed to extend the line from Whimsey northwards to link up with the Hereford, Ross & Gloucester Railway at Mitcheldean Road; the line was taken over by the GWR in 1878 and completed, but never fully opened.

== Passenger traffic ==
From the late 1890s, shipments from Bullo Pill declined, and the last cargo of stone left the dock in 1926. The lock gates collapsed and the basin silted up. The coal-loading chute was eventually scrapped.

Passenger traffic on the line began on 3 August 1907, a rail motor service with halts at Bullo Cross, Upper Soudley, Staple Edge, Ruspidge, Bilson, Whimsey and Steam Mills Crossing. From 6 April 1908 the opening of a new length of track allowed trains to continue to the Severn and Wye Railway station at Cinderford.

The line closed to passengers from 1 November 1958, while goods traffic continued until the entire branch was closed on 1 August 1967.

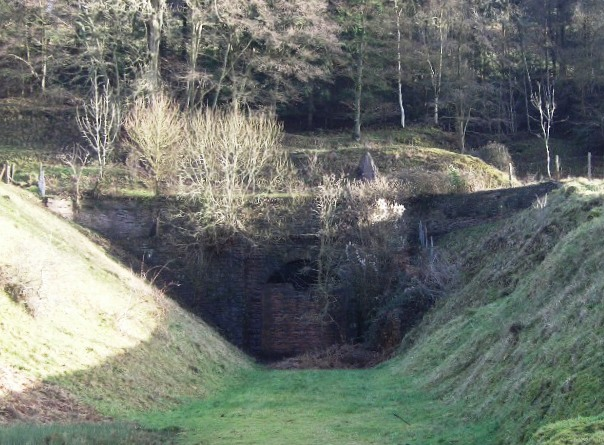
Western portal of Haie Hill Tunnel in 2006

== Surviving remnants ==
The track was lifted by the end of 1969, but much of the line can still be traced on foot. The original mines and industrial buildings have long disappeared, and the route is now mainly rural. Between Ruspidge and Bilson the route is now a linear park; sections of broad-gauge rail can be seen in use as fence posts. South of Ruspidge residential developments have encroached on the line, though the branch to Lightmoor Colliery can still be followed, and still retains many of its original stone sleeper blocks. Around Soudley the route is almost untouched and can easily be traced. The branch around Whimsey has largely been obliterated by roads and light industrial development. Between Haie Hill Tunnel and Bullo Pill, the line is mostly in private hands and has reverted to pasture, though the bricked-up tunnel entrance still exists.

In 1991 the dock at Bullo Pill was cleared of silt and new lock gates installed, but there remains little activity although some private boats are stored and refurbished there.
