= Berkeley railway station =

Disused railway station in Berkeley, Gloucestershire, England

Coordinates: 51.70081°N 2.45656°W

Berkeley
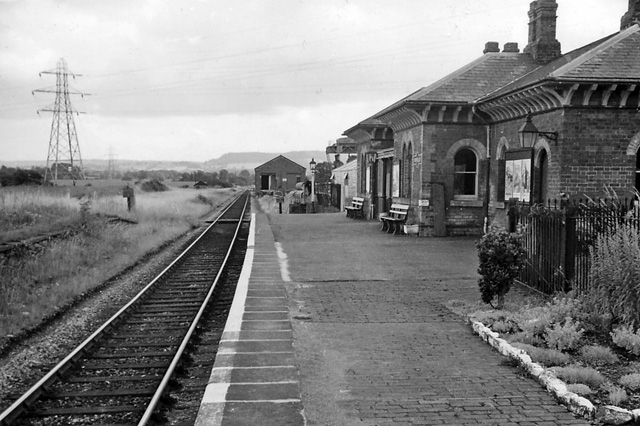
- Berkeley railway station in 1961

General information
- Location: Berkeley, Gloucestershire, Stroud; England
- Grid reference: SO685003
- Platforms: originally 2 later 1

Other information
- Status: Disused

History
- Original company: Midland Railway
- Pre-grouping: Severn and Wye and Severn Bridge Railway (GWR & MR joint line)
- Post-grouping: S&W&SBR

Key dates
- 1 August 1876: Opened
- 2 November 1964: Closed
Location

Berkeley railway station served the town of Berkeley in Gloucestershire, England. The station was on the Sharpness Branch Line, part of the Midland Railway (MR), which connected the Bristol and Gloucester Railway main line at Berkeley Road station with the docks at Sharpness.

== History ==
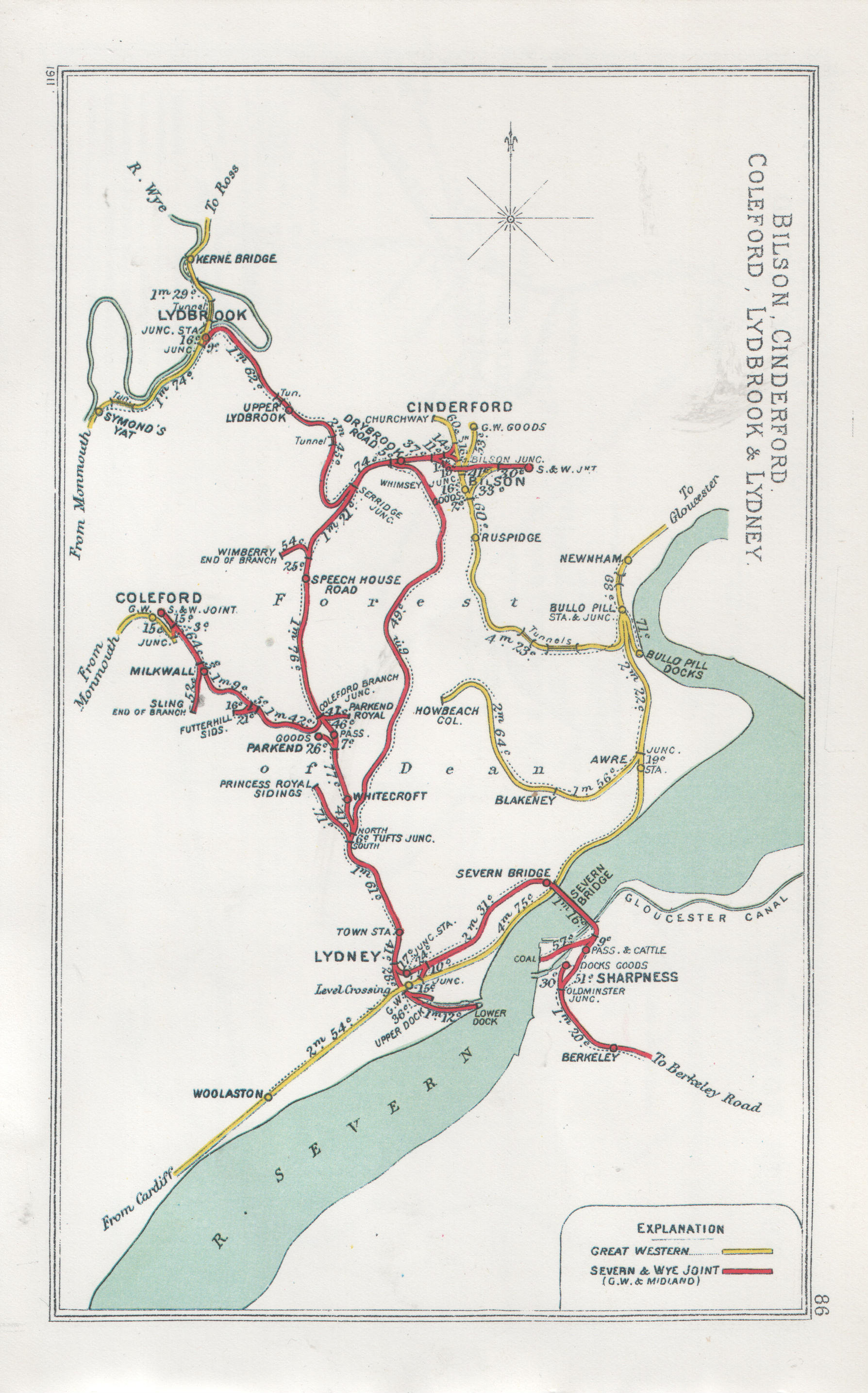
The area to the west, 1911

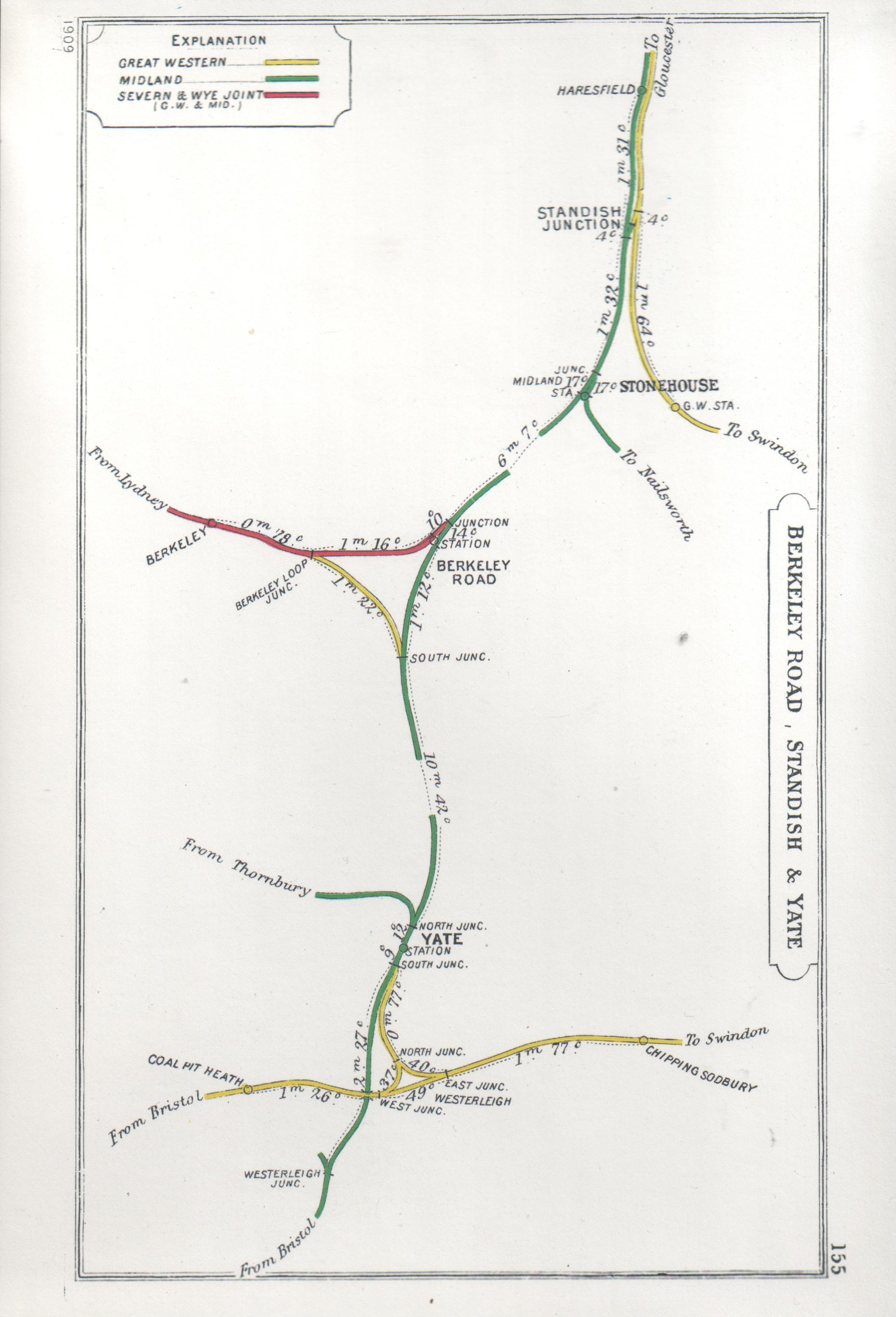
The area to the east, 1909

Railway Clearing House maps of railways in the vicinity of Berkeley

The Midland Railway's Gloucester & Berkeley New Docks branch, from Berkeley Road station to the docks at Sharpness, was authorised in 1872. On the same day, the Severn Bridge Railway was authorised, which would connect the Berkeley branch to the Severn and Wye Railway and Great Western Railway (GWR) at Lydney Junction. The branch line was opened to freight traffic in August 1875 with passenger services starting a year later. The station opened for passengers on 1 August 1876.

Before the branch line was built, Berkeley had been served by Berkeley Road, which was originally called "Dursley and Berkeley Road" and opened in 1844. It was two miles east of the town. Berkeley station was marginally more convenient: about a mile north of the town.

The Sharpness branch became a through-route from 1879 with the opening of the Severn Railway Bridge, connecting Sharpness with the Forest of Dean side of the Severn Estuary and enabling through services between Berkeley Road and Lydney Town railway station, some of which ran on to Lydbrook. Children from Berkeley attending school in Lydney were among the passengers.

Upon the opening of the Severn Bridge on 17 October 1879, the Severn Bridge Railway amalgamated with the Severn & Wye Railway, to form the Severn & Wye & Severn Bridge Railway. This got into financial difficulties in 1883, and on 1 July 1894, was sold jointly to the GWR and MR; the Sharpness branch was transferred to the joint committee at the same time.

The branch line was double track and the station building, built of brick, was on the down platform. There was a goods shed and a small goods yard just before the station on the line in from Berkeley Road. The line was later singled and the up platform (for trains towards Berkeley Road) was then redundant.

Through-services to Lydney on the line ceased abruptly in October 1960 when the Severn Railway Bridge was damaged beyond economic repair in a shipping accident. The station closed on 2 November 1964, when passenger services ceased on the Sharpness branch; goods facilities were withdrawn two years later. The station buildings were demolished though the stationmaster's house remains. A gantry crane was installed over a single remaining siding in the former goods yard to allow the loading of nuclear fuel flasks from Berkeley nuclear power station which saw regular, if infrequent, use. The power station was decommissioned in 1989 but the siding and crane remain in place. The track through the site remains as the Sharpness docks link is still open for very occasional freight services.

== Station masters ==
- circa 1881 Henry James Mabbett

== Services ==
Preceding station	Disused railways	Following station
Berkeley Road; Station closed	Sharpness Branch Line; Midland Railway	Sharpness; Station closed
