= Sharpness railway station =

Former railway station in England

Coordinates: 51.7228°N 2.4697°W

Sharpness

General information
- Location: Sharpness, Stroud; England
- Grid reference: SO676028
- Platforms: 2 (1 from 1931)

Other information
- Status: Disused

History
- Original company: Midland Railway
- Pre-grouping: Severn and Wye and Severn Bridge Railway (GWR & MR joint line)
- Post-grouping: S&W&SBR

Key dates
- 1 August 1876: First station opened
- 16 October 1879: Station resited on different line
- 2 November 1964: Second station closed
Location

Sharpness railway station served the village and docks of Sharpness in Gloucestershire, England from 1875 to 1964.

== History ==
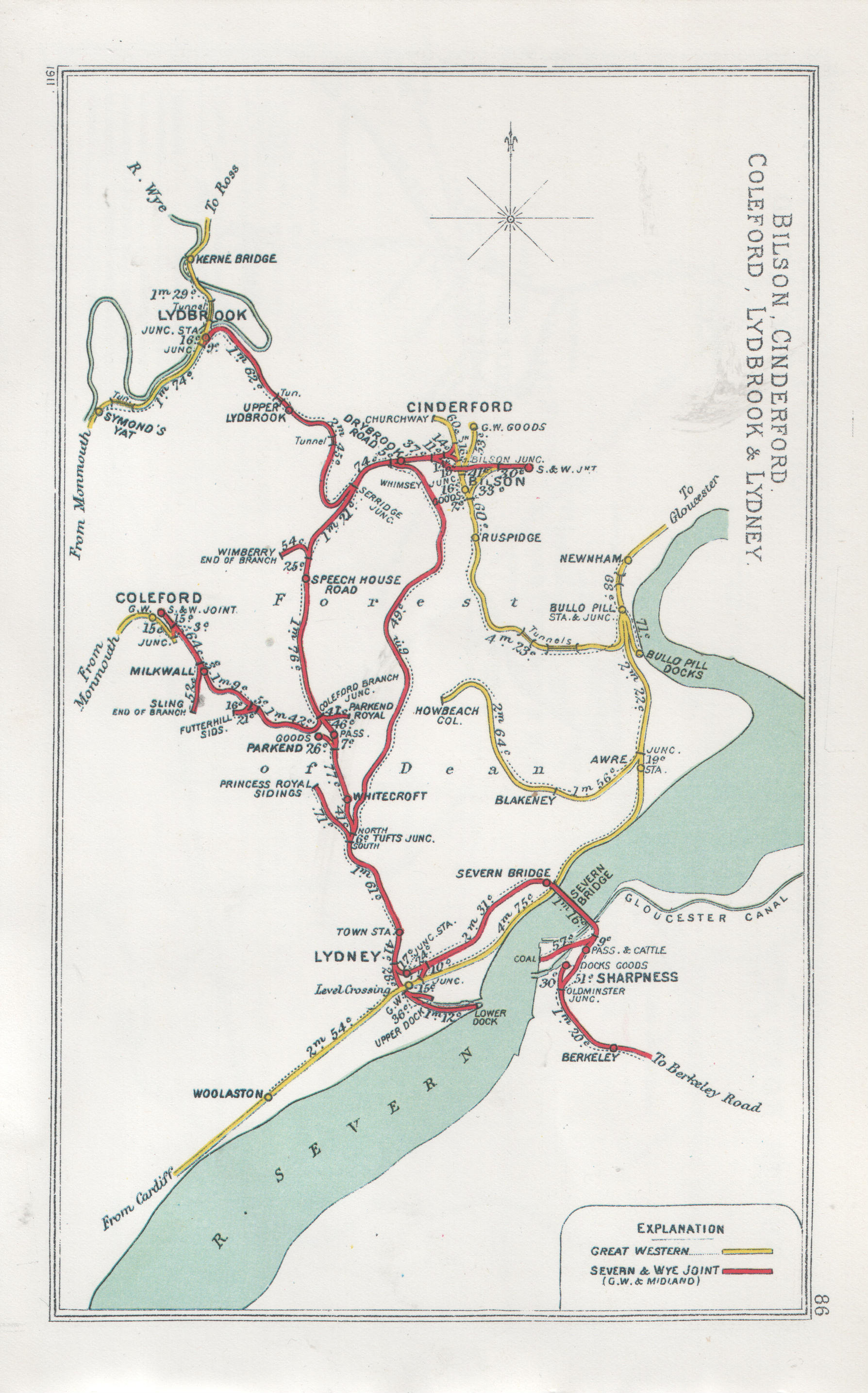
A 1911 Railway Clearing House map of railways in the vicinity of Sharpness

The station was on the Sharpness Branch Line, part of the Midland Railway, which connected the Bristol and Gloucester Railway main line at Berkeley Road station with the docks at Sharpness. The Sharpness New Docks and Gloucester and Birmingham Navigation Company started operation at Sharpness in 1874. The branch line was opened to freight traffic in August 1875 with passenger services starting a year later.

Sharpness station was originally a terminus for the passenger services and was no more than a temporary platform next to the docks. But in 1879, the Sharpness branch became a through-route with the opening of the Severn Railway Bridge, connecting Sharpness with the Forest of Dean side of the Severn Estuary and enabling through services between Berkeley Road and Lydney Town railway station, some of which ran on to Lydbrook. The new station, built on a curve, had a brick building on the "up" platform (towards Berkeley) and a small shelter on the down platform. Children from Sharpness attending school in Lydney were among the passengers. After 1931, the line was singled.

Through-services to Lydney on the line ceased abruptly in October 1960 when the Severn Railway Bridge was damaged beyond economic repair in a shipping accident, and Sharpness resumed its earlier status as a branch line terminus. Passenger services ceased on the branch in November 1964 and goods facilities were withdrawn in January 1966. The station buildings were demolished. The line to the docks is still open for very occasional freight services.

The Vale of Berkeley Railway Group has campaigned to restore the station and railway.

On 22 October 2019, Stroud District Council announced a draft plan to build a railway station in Sharpness, to support housebuilding plans.

== Services ==
Preceding station	Disused railways	Following station
Berkeley	Sharpness Branch Line	Terminus
Berkeley	Severn Bridge Railway	Severn Bridge
