= Severn Bridge railway station =

Former railway station in England

Coordinates: 51.7361°N 2.4825°W

Severn Bridge for Blakeney
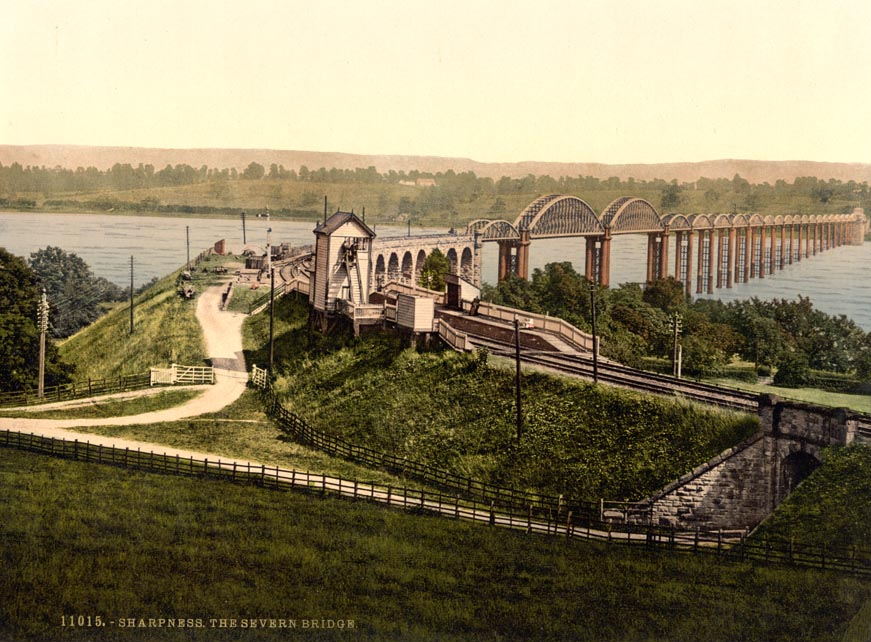
- Severn Bridge station and the Bridge

General information
- Location: Purton, Forest of Dean; England
- Grid reference: SO667043
- Platforms: 2

Other information
- Status: Disused

History
- Original company: Severn Bridge Railway
- Pre-grouping: Severn and Wye and Severn Bridge Railway (GWR & MR joint line)
- Post-grouping: S&W&SBR

Key dates
- 20 October 1879: Station opened
- 26 October 1960: services suspended
- November 1964: officially closed
Location

Severn Bridge railway station was a small station on the Severn Bridge Railway located close to the north west bank of the River Severn, 2 miles (3 km) northeast of Lydney in Gloucestershire, England.

== History ==
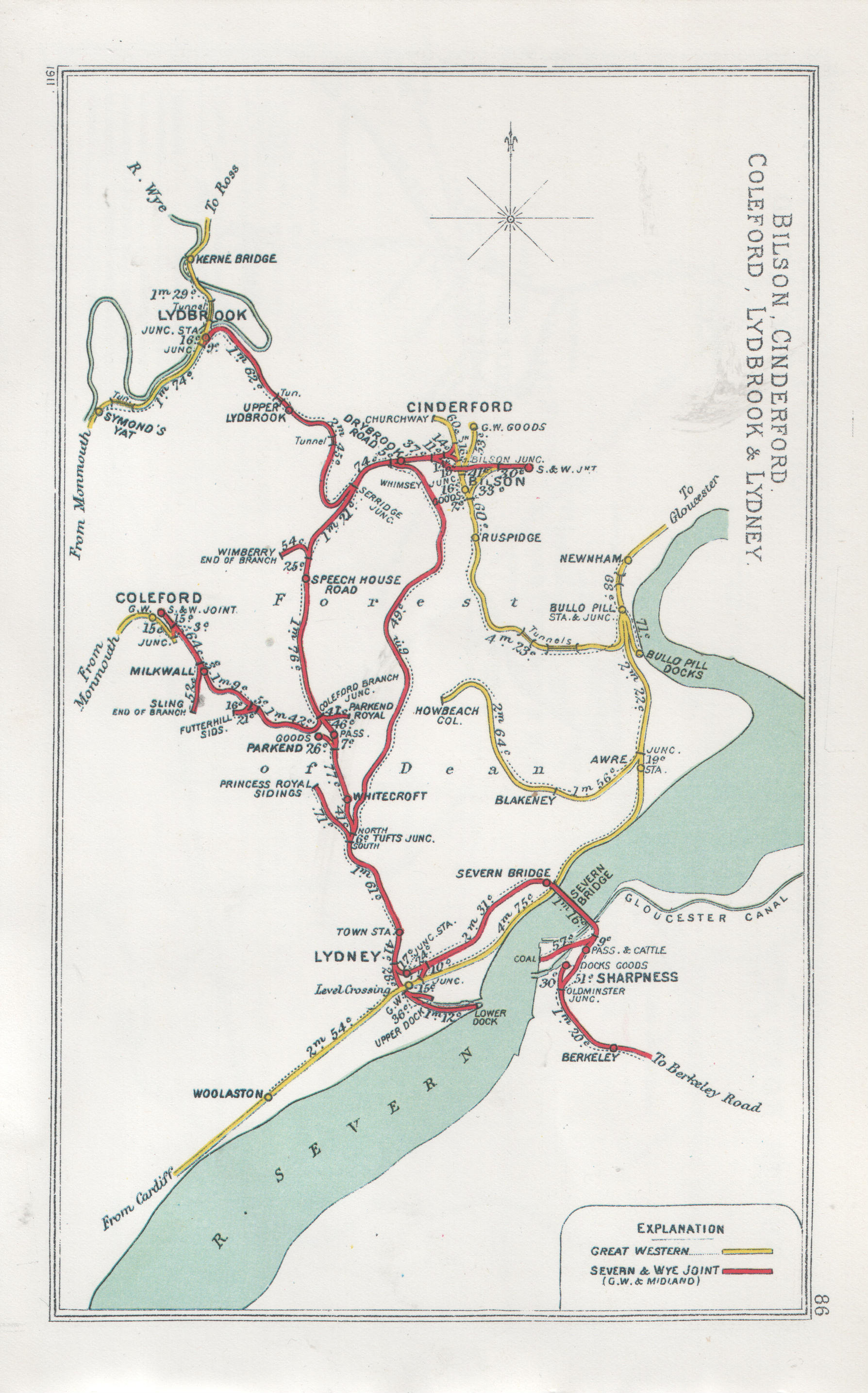
A 1911 Railway Clearing House map of railways in the vicinity of Severn Bridge

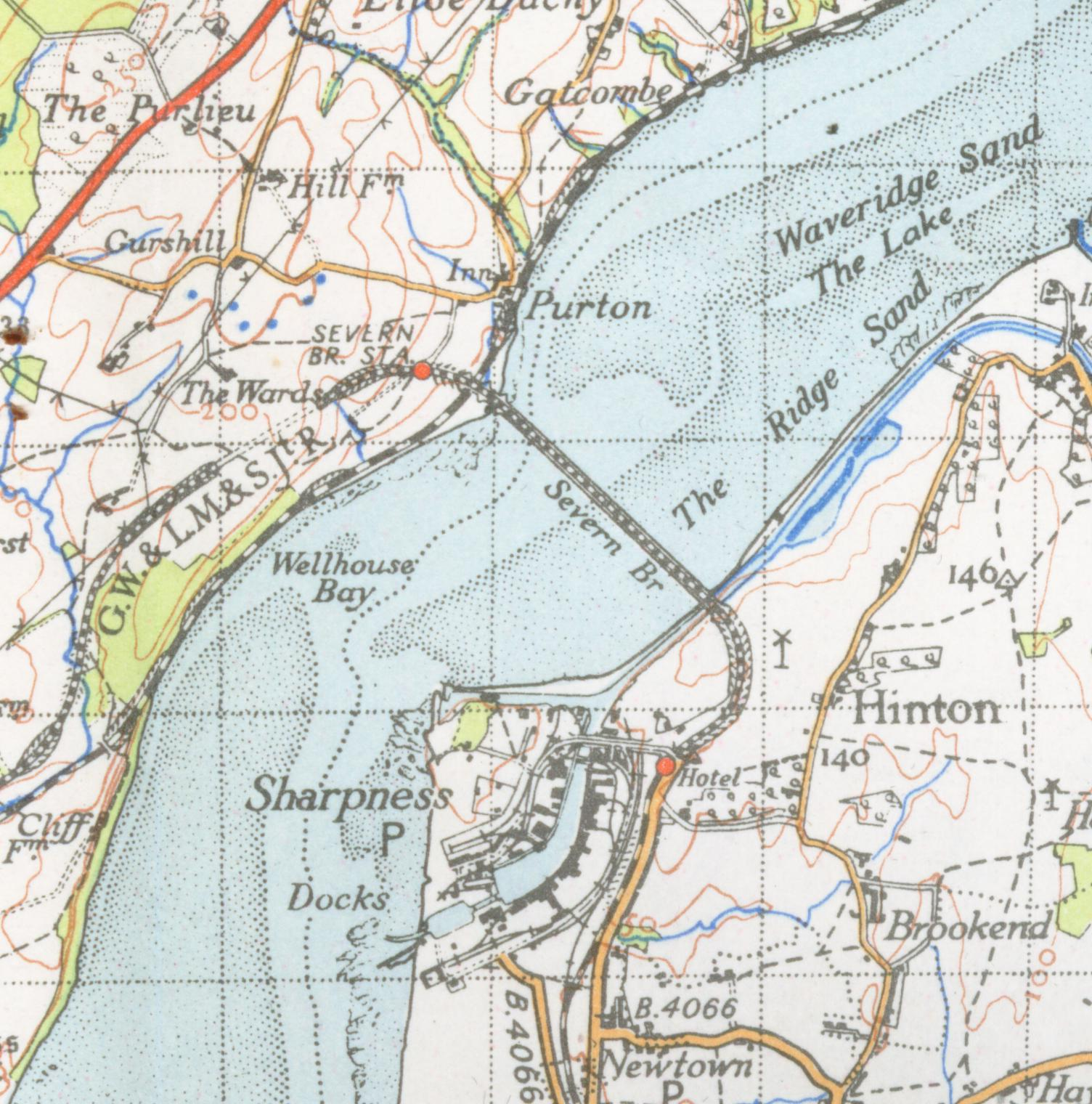
A map from 1946, showing the station location

The Severn Bridge Railway linked Lydney Junction railway station on the north bank of the River Severn with Sharpness Docks on the south bank via the Severn Railway Bridge. The railway joined up at Sharpness with the Sharpness Branch Line which had been built from Berkeley Road railway station on the Bristol and Gloucester Railway to the docks in 1875. The opening of the bridge in 1879 provided a cross-Severn route for Forest of Dean and south Wales coal both to Sharpness docks and to Bristol.

On the north side of the river, the bridge was approached on a series of arches, one of which traversed the Gloucester to Chepstow and Newport main line. Severn Bridge station was on the embankment leading up to these arches, on a section of the line that ran almost parallel with and to the north of the main line as both went into Lydney Junction, about two miles to the south west.

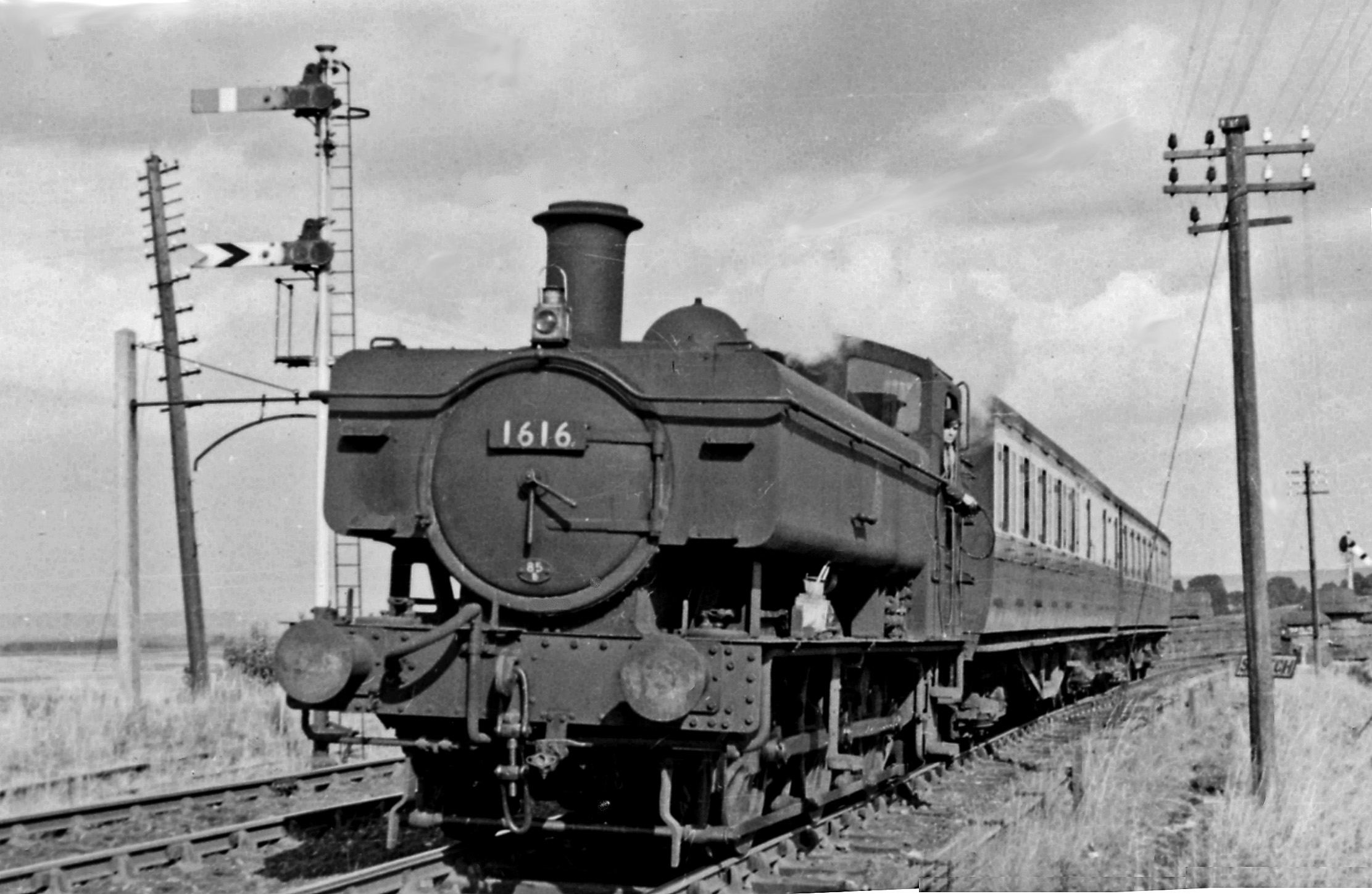
Berkeley Rd to Lydney train at Severn Bridge station, looking east, towards the Severn Bridge, hauled by GW '1600' class 0-6-0T No. 1616 (built 12/49, withdrawn 10/59!).

Severn Bridge station had a passing loop, small shelters on the two platforms and a signalbox. There was a short siding with a cattle pen at the end of the station nearer to the bridge, which closed in 1957. At times, the station was known as "Severn Bridge for Blakeney".

The Severn Railway Bridge was hit by petrol barges in a shipping accident on 25 October 1960 which demolished two of its 22 spans, and it was judged to be beyond economic repair. All services on the line were suspended, though it was not officially closed until November 1964. The Severn Bridge station site, according to a book published in 2003, was then "just left to rot".

== Services ==
Preceding station	Disused railways	Following station
Lydney Junction; GWR station remains open	Severn Bridge Railway; Midland Railway and Severn and Wye Railway	Sharpness; Station closed
