= Westerleigh Junction =

Railway junction in Gloucestershire, England

Coordinates: 51.5207°N 2.4355°W

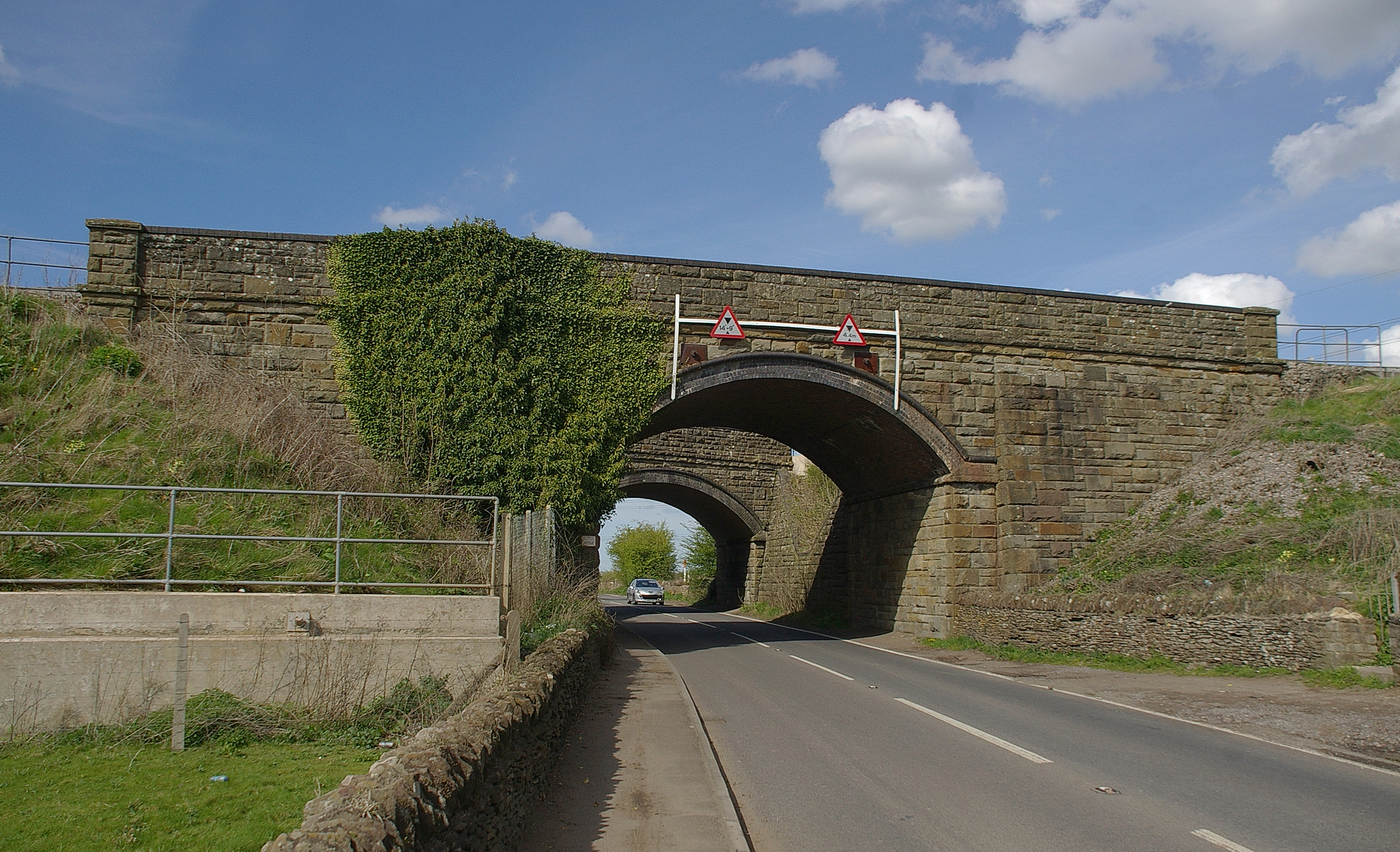
The South Wales Main Line and Cross Country Route passing over Westerleigh Road.

Westerleigh Junction is a railway junction in Gloucestershire, England, where the Cross Country Route (XCR) from York to Bristol Temple Meads meets the South Wales Main Line (SWML) from London Paddington to Swansea, near the village of Westerleigh.

The junction is located between the stations of Bristol Parkway, Swindon and Yate.

== Description ==
The junction provides access from the SWML to the west and the XCR to the north. The lines cross Westerleigh Road in separate bridges, with a bridge over the old Bristol and Gloucester Railway, now a single line to a Murco depot, just to the west of the junction.

The South Wales Main Line section of the junction was electrified with 25 kV AC overhead lines as part of the 21st Century upgrade of the Great Western Main Line.

== History ==
The junction originated in 1903, when the Great Western Railway opened the Badminton Line, the direct route of the South Wales Main Line. The junction connected the eastbound SWML to the northbound Midland Railway (now part of the XCR), which had opened in 1844 as the Bristol and Gloucester Railway. The junction provided a route from Bristol to the Midland Railway via Filton Junction, an alternative to the direct Midland Railway route through Mangotsfield.

In 1908 a curve was added to the junction to connect the westbound SWML to the northbound Midland Railway. This provided a connection from Bristol to Sharpness via Berkeley. It also gave an alternative route between Bristol and South Wales via the Severn Railway Bridge, used when the Severn Tunnel was closed. A more contentious use was that it now gave the GWR, with its running powers over the Midland to Berkeley and its own new 1906 line from Cheltenham to Birmingham, a new direct route from Bristol to Birmingham. On 1 July 1908, a new express service between Wolverhampton and Bristol was inaugurated, hauled by Flower class 4101 Aurricula. The Midland resisted this new service and claimed that the loop had only been agreed on the basis of services to Berkeley and the Severn, not northwards. Various tactics were used to disrupt competing services, including slow trains scheduled ahead of GWR expresses. The matter came to court, but in November the Court of Appeal finally ruled that the GWR did have running powers northwards. Despite this, the Midland remained disruptive. In particular they refused to allow heavier locomotives, like the new 4-6-0s, over Stonehouse Viaduct and so this remained the preserve of the 4-4-0 Counties.

The curve was removed after the Severn Railway Bridge was irreparably damaged in 1960.

In 1970 the original route of the Bristol and Gloucester Railway was closed between Bristol and Westerleigh Junction, except for the short section now serving the Murco depot.
