= Beaver Line (disambiguation) =

Beaver Line may refer to:

- Beaver Line (railway), see Sharpness Branch Line
- Beaver Line (shipping), a Canadian shipping line of the Canada Shipping Company, owner of SS Mount Temple
