= Sharpness branch line =

UK railway branch line

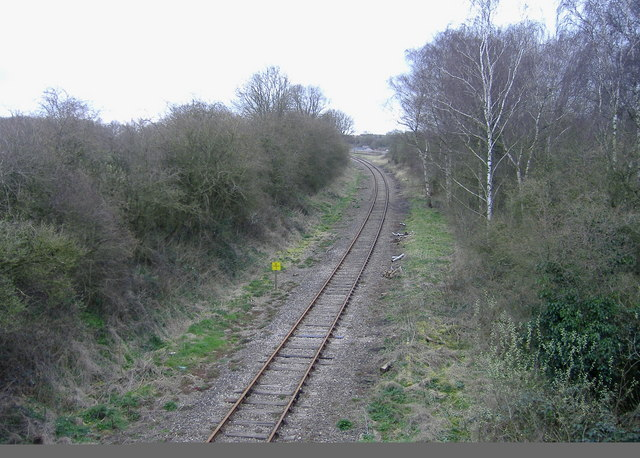
The freight-only line to Sharpness

The Sharpness branch line is a railway in Gloucestershire, England, built by the Midland Railway (MR) to connect the port of Sharpness to the main Bristol and Gloucester Railway. The line opened for goods traffic in 1875 and to passenger traffic a year later. Passenger services were withdrawn in November 1964, but the line remains open for freight traffic to and from Sharpness Docks.

== History ==
The branch line opened on 1 August 1876, and was four miles long and ran from Berkeley Road station, which was the junction with the main line, to Sharpness, with an intervening station to serve the town of Berkeley.

The line's status as a branch was short-lived. In 1879, the Severn Bridge Railway (SBR) opened to connect Sharpness across the Severn Railway Bridge to Lydney and the Forest of Dean on the north bank of the river Severn. Passenger through-services were run between Lydney and Berkeley Road, and the through-line's freight capacity contributed to the further development of Sharpness docks. Sharpness station was re-sited as a through station.

Upon the opening of the SBR on 17 October 1879, it amalgamated with the Severn and Wye Railway to form the Severn and Wye and Severn Bridge Railway. This railway got into financial difficulties in 1883, and on 1 July 1894 was sold to the Great Western Railway (GWR) and the MR, becoming a joint line. The Sharpness branch (totalling 4 miles 54 chains (7.5 km)) was transferred from the MR to the joint committee on the same day.

On 9 March 1908, together with the opening of new connections between the MR and GWR to the south of Yate, a second junction of the Sharpness branch with the main line was provided south of Berkeley Road to enable freight trains from Sharpness Docks to go south towards Bristol; this line, 1 mile 22 chains (2.1 km) in length and known as the Berkeley loop, was always GWR property.

This state of affairs lasted until October 1960, when an accident involving petroleum barges on the river Severn brought down part of the railway bridge. The bridge was judged to be beyond economic repair, and the Sharpness branch line resumed its earlier status as a branch. Passenger services lasted for only four more years, though, being withdrawn in November 1964, and the stations at Sharpness and Berkeley were closed. The line remains open for freight traffic to and from Sharpness Docks, though these services are not frequent.

== Re-opening proposal ==
=== First attempt ===
Sharpness Berkeley Railway Ltd (Company No. 07166656) intended to re-open the line as a heritage railway, using the trading names "Berkeley Vale Railway" and "The Beaver Line". Freight trains serving the Berkeley and Oldbury nuclear power stations would continue to be operated by Direct Rail Services. Rolling stock from the Stratford on Avon and Broadway Railway was expected to be used but this plan had been dropped. In March 2011, site clearance at Sharpness was carried out by members of the Proactive Vision community group, which had obtained a lease of part of the line from Network Rail. Tracklaying began in January 2012. Sharpness Berkeley Railway Ltd, Company No. 07166656, was dissolved on 12 June 2012.

=== Second attempt ===
On 24 August 2015, a new group, now known as the Vale of Berkeley Railway Trust, announced its intention to restore the branch as a heritage railway, along with the announcement that it had secured a lease on the former diesel shed at Sharpness Docks with the nearby Canal & River Trust. It has restored the shed to carry out restorations of its rolling stock and now has a fully functional machine shop, where it undertakes work for the railway project as well as external contract work for companies such as Bombardier. It has a number of active restoration projects, for which new volunteers are always welcome. The VoBR now has 3 active work sites: at Sharpness Docks where the main engineering base is located, the derelict sidings known as Oldminster Sidings where a lease has been granted by Network Rail to build a storage and maintenance depot for the railway. The site has been cleared ready for track relaying and work on developing the site and building a shed and other facilities is expected to start in early 2021. At Berkeley station, some of the station site has been cleared, the foundations of the old station building have been uncovered and a regular team of volunteers meet there to work each Wednesday./

=== October 2019 announcement ===
On 22 October 2019, Stroud District Council announced a draft plan to build a railway station in Sharpness, to support housebuilding plans. A bid to reopen the Sharpness branch line as a tourist heritage line (VoBR), and later upgrading the line to public passenger services to serve the locality, was submitted in the third round of the Government's 'Restoring Your Railway' Ideas Fund in 2021 but was not one of the successful bids.

== Rolling stock ==
=== Steam locomotives ===
- LMS Fowler Class 4F 0-6-0 No. 44027. Built in 1924. Undergoing overhaul.
- LMS Stanier 'Black 5' 5MT No. 44901. Built in 1945. Stored awaiting restoration.
- Wemyss Private Railway Austerity Class 0-6-0ST No. 15 'Earl David'. Built in 1945. Arrived at Sharpness in September 2016 and currently being dismantled for overhaul.

=== Diesel locomotives ===
- British Rail Class 03 0-6-0DM No. D2069. Built in 1959. Arrived at Sharpness from Toddington in December 2015. It was restored to working order in 2019, appearing at the DFR autumn Diesel Gala before moving to the Gwili Railway on loan.
- British Rail Class 14 0-6-0DH No. D9553. Built in 1965. Arrived at Sharpness in January 2016 and currently stored off site awaiting restoration.
- Thomas Hill Vanguard 4wDH No. TH184V 'British Gypsum No. 2'. Built in 1967. Arrived at Sharpness in February 2016. The loco is currently in operational condition, having been repainted since its arrival on site. It is now out on loan.
