= Berkeley Road railway station =

Disused railway station in Berkeley, Gloucestershire, England

Coordinates: 51.69933°N 2.40967°W

Berkeley Road
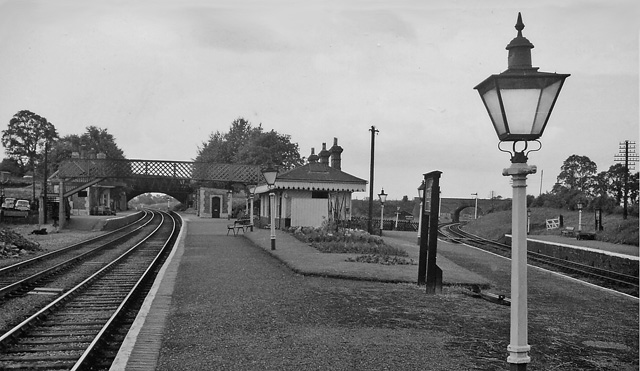
- Berkeley Road railway station in 1961

General information
- Location: Stinchcombe, Stroud; England
- Grid reference: SO718002
- Platforms: 4

Other information
- Status: Disused

History
- Original company: Bristol and Gloucester Railway
- Pre-grouping: Midland Railway / Severn and Wye Railway (joint)
- Post-grouping: London, Midland and Scottish Railway / S&W (joint)

Key dates
- 6 July 1844: Opened as 'Dursley and Berkeley'
- 1 June 1845: Renamed 'Berkeley Road'
- 4 January 1965: Closed
Location

Berkeley Road railway station served the towns of Berkeley and Dursley in Gloucestershire, England. It was opened in 1844 and closed in 1965.

== History ==
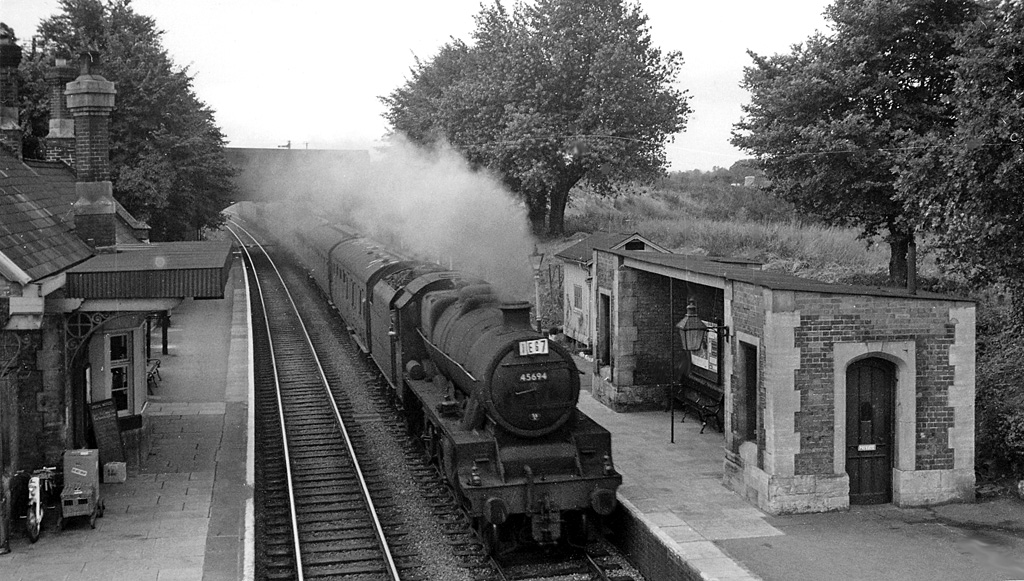
View towards Bristol

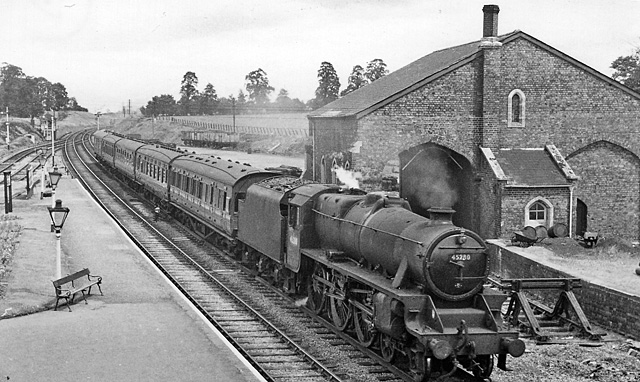
View towards Gloucester in 1961

The station was one of the original six stations on the Bristol and Gloucester Railway which opened for passengers on 8 July 1844 and for goods on 2 September 1844. This was a broad gauge line engineered by Isambard Kingdom Brunel. It was taken over by the Midland Railway in 1846 and converted to standard gauge in 1854. It was two miles east of Berkeley and three north-west of Dursley, and for the first year of its life it was called 'Dursley and Berkeley Road'. Dursley acquired a station of its own in 1856 with the opening of the Dursley and Midland Junction Railway branch from Coaley Junction.

The Sharpness Branch Line was built in 1875 from Berkeley Road station to the new docks at Sharpness, passing around three quarters of a mile to the north of the town of Berkeley. The branch opened for goods traffic that year and to passenger services in 1876, with a station at Berkeley. The Sharpness branch became a through-route to Lydney and the Forest of Dean in 1879 with the completion of the Severn Railway Bridge. The junction for the Sharpness line was to the north of Berkeley Road station. The branch line trains used two new platforms built at a tangent to the existing Brunel-designed station. The junction was controlled by a signal box at the north end of the branch line up (northbound) platform. A footbridge between the platforms was provided in 1883.

Berkeley Road was considered one of the more important stations on the Bristol and Gloucester line and some long-distance trains called there. The Sharpness branch, however, became less important and was reduced to single track in the 1930s. Damage to the Severn railway bridge in 1960 led the branch to cease being a through-route and passenger services were withdrawn in November 1964, though it remained open for some goods traffic.

Berkeley Road closed to passengers on 4 January 1965 with the withdrawal of stopping services between Bristol Temple Meads and Gloucester. Goods facilities at the station remained open until 1 November 1966, except for a private siding which has since closed. The station structure was demolished after service ended.

== Services ==
Preceding station	Disused railways	Following station
Charfield; Line open, station closed	Bristol and Gloucester Railway; Midland Railway	Coaley Junction; Line open, station closed; Resited and reopened as Cam and Dursley
Berkeley; Line and station closed	Sharpness Branch Line; Midland Railway	Coaley Junction; Line open, station closed; Resited and reopened as Cam and Dursley
