= Severn Railway Bridge =

Former bridge in United Kingdom

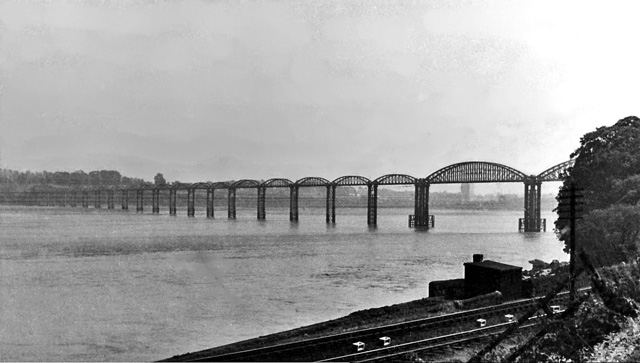
- Severn Railway Bridge in July 1948
- Coordinates: 51°43′58″N 2°28′26″W
- Crossed: River Severn
- Locale: Lydney – Sharpness
- Preceded by: Severn Tunnel

Characteristics
- Total length: 4,162 feet (1,269 m)
- Clearance above: 70 feet (21 m)

History
- Designer: George Baker Keeling
- Construction start: 1875; 151 years ago
- Construction end: 1879; 147 years ago
- Collapsed: 25 October 1960; 65 years ago (partial)

Location
- Interactive map of Severn Railway Bridge

The Severn Railway Bridge (historically called the Severn Bridge) was a bridge carrying the railway across the River Severn between Sharpness and Lydney in Gloucestershire, England. It was built in the 1870s by the Severn Bridge Railway Company, primarily to carry coal from the Forest of Dean to the docks at Sharpness; it was the furthest-downstream bridge over the Severn until the opening of the Severn road bridge in 1966. When the company got into financial difficulties in 1893, it was taken over jointly by the Great Western Railway and the Midland Railway companies. The bridge continued to be used for freight and passenger services until 1960, and saw temporary extra traffic on the occasions that the Severn Tunnel was closed for engineering work.

The bridge was constructed by Hamilston's Windsor Ironworks Company Limited of Garston, Liverpool. It was approached from the north via a masonry viaduct and had twenty-two spans. The pier columns were formed of circular sections, bolted together and filled with concrete. The twenty-one regular wrought iron spans were then put in place, as well as the southernmost span, the swing bridge over the Gloucester and Sharpness Canal. The bridge was 4,162 ft (1,269 m) long and 70 ft (21 m) above high water. 6,800 long tons (7,600 short tons; 6,900 t) of iron were used in its construction.

A number of incidents took place at the bridge over the years, with vessels colliding with the piers due to the strong tides. In 1960 two river barges hit one of the piers on the bridge, causing two spans to collapse into the river. Repair work was under consideration when a similar collision occurred the following year, after which it was decided that it would be uneconomical to repair the bridge. It was demolished between 1967 and 1970, with few traces remaining.

== Construction ==
For more than fifty years before the Severn Railway Bridge was opened, there had been discussion and various proposals for rail routes to cross the Severn downstream of Gloucester, either by a bridge or a tunnel, but most of these did not leave the drawing board. The exception was a tunnel near Newnham on Severn in 1810; this had been excavated partway under the river when water broke in, and the tunnellers were lucky to escape with their lives. The damage was irreparable and the project abandoned. In 1845, an ambitious project by Isambard Kingdom Brunel was to bridge the Severn near Awre for his projected South Wales Railway, bypassing Gloucester completely. This plan got close to receiving the approval of Parliament but did not proceed. Other schemes were mooted and in 1871, six different schemes were under consideration. Finally the Severn Bridge Railway's scheme was approved by Parliament and received Royal Assent on 18 July 1872.

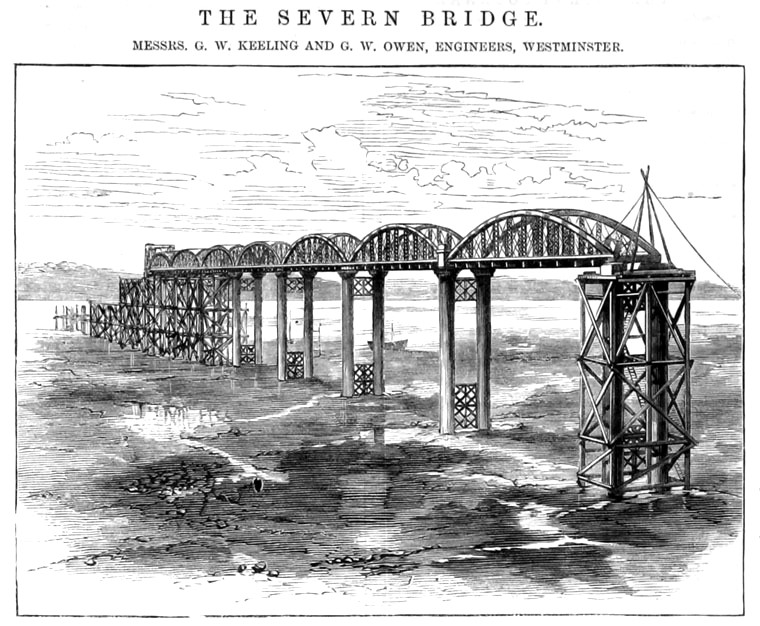
Bridge under construction, 1877

The Severn Railway Bridge was built by the Severn Bridge Railway Company to transport coal from the Forest of Dean on the Severn and Wye Railway. At the time it was expected that the amount of coal freighted would increase year by year and the existence of a bridge would remove the necessity for the coal to be shipped via Gloucester. Work began in 1875 and was completed in 1879; the wrought iron bridge, which was 4,162 feet (1,270 m) long and 70 feet (21 m) above high water, had twenty-two spans and had stone abutments made from local limestone. The first span across the Gloucester and Sharpness Canal, which ran parallel to the Severn at this point, operated as a swing bridge. The twenty-one fixed spans, in order of erection from the southeast (Sharpness) side, consisted of thirteen of length 134 ft (41 m), five of length 174 ft (53 m), two of length 312 ft (95 m), and a single span of length 134 ft (41 m). The bridge incorporated 6,800 long tons (7,600 short tons; 6,900 t) of iron. It was approached from the south-east by a two-arch masonry viaduct on the canal embankment leading to the swing bridge, and on the northwest by a 12-arch viaduct about 70 ft (21 m) high.

The river, with its large tidal range (the Severn bore) and strong currents, made construction difficult. The pier columns were formed of 4 ft (1.2 m) cylindrical sections, about 10 ft (3.0 m) in diameter. Near the west bank, the bedrock was a long way below the shifting sands so much work had to prepare firm foundations. Staging was used through which the sections were lowered by chains, and when in place, filled with concrete. Near the east bank, a primitive piling machine was used to drive the sections through a ridge of clay. The staging was extended upwards for use while assembling the spans.

The spans were assembled on site. Staging was laid and rails put in place to carry a travelling crane. The long beams were hoisted in place first, followed by the vertical bracings, and then the outer and inner plates of the top chordal trusses and the diagonals. The whole structure was bolted together at first, and later riveted by blacksmiths using hand-operated forges. Some individual spans were completed within a week, with contractors being complimented on the efficiency of their work.

The main contractor was Hamilston's Windsor Ironworks Company Limited of Garston, Liverpool. They were tasked with the founding and erection of the pier cylinders on the riverbed, and the erection and riveting of the twenty-one bowstring spans and the swing bridge over the Gloucester and Sharpness Canal. They were also responsible for another swing bridge on the North Docks Branch of the line close to the New Docks at Sharpness. The company manufactured the castings and the wrought-iron structures for the bridge. Project manager George Earle was later given a watch praising his ability and enthusiasm for carrying out the project. The engineers for the project were George Wells Owen and George William Keeling.

== History ==
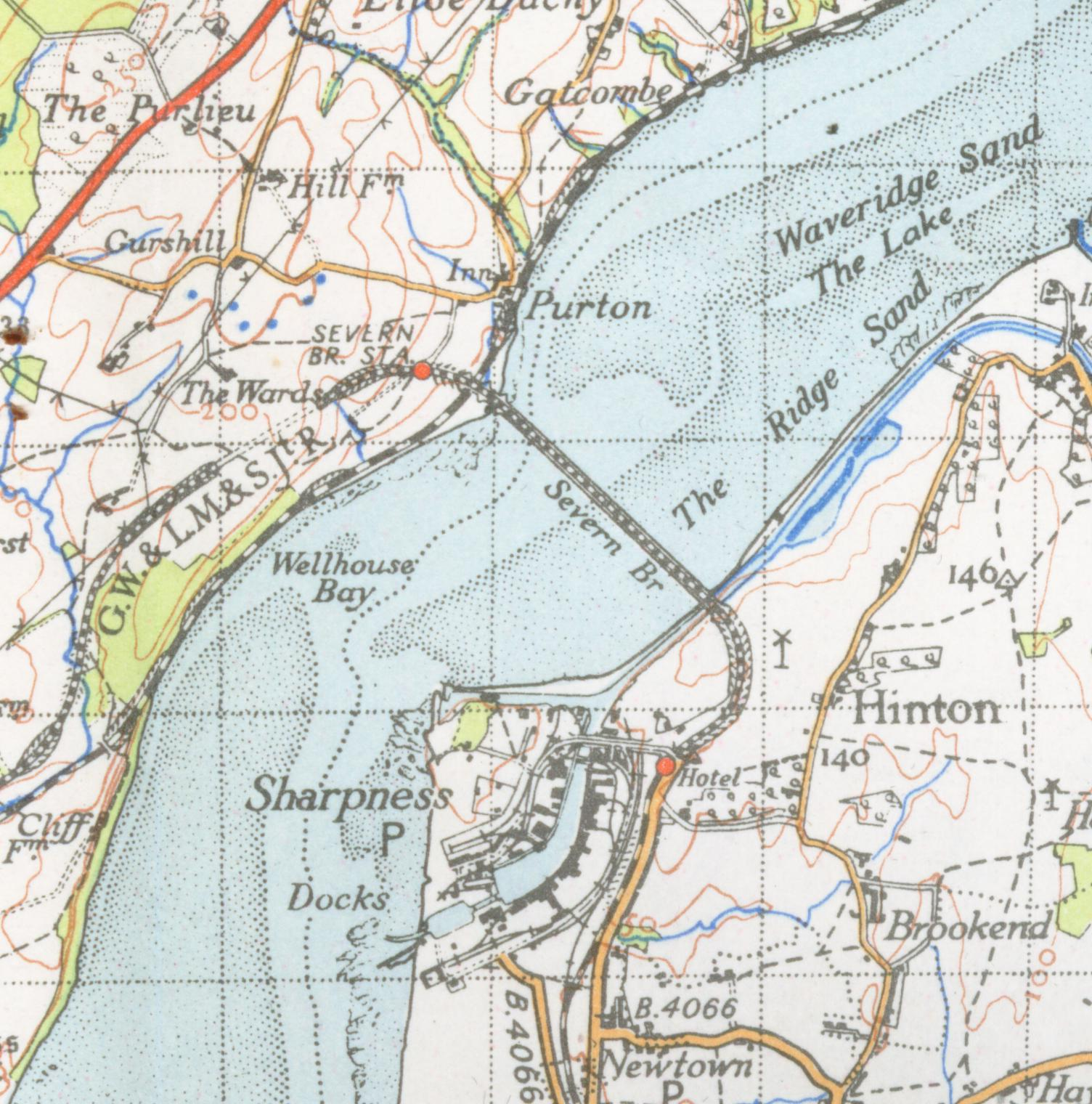
A 1946 Ordnance Survey map showing the bridge and branch line.

The bridge carried a single-track railway line. When it came into service, it took approximately 30 miles (48 km) off the journey from Bristol to Cardiff, with trains no longer having to pass through Gloucester. The bridge predated the construction of the Severn Tunnel, around 14 miles (23 km) downstream, by seven years. The opening ceremony for the bridge took place on 17 October 1879; nearly 400 dignitaries travelled in twenty-three first class carriages across the bridge and back again, with fog detonators exploding on each of the spans during the return trip. A banquet followed at the Pleasure Grounds near Sharpness station.

During construction, it was anticipated that the Severn Bridge Railway would mainly receive its revenue from carrying coal from the Forest of Dean. However, the company ran into financial difficulties as coal was not carried in the volumes that had been anticipated, nor had tourist travel risen to the expected levels. Miners in the Forest of Dean went on strike about low pay and poor conditions and the coal trade there continued to be depressed. The opening of the Severn Tunnel, providing an alternative route from England into South Wales, was a serious blow to the bridge. By 1890, the company was unable to pay the interest on its debentures and faced bankruptcy. As a result, it was taken over jointly by the Great Western Railway and the Midland Railway in 1893, becoming the Severn and Wye Joint Railway.

Several fatalities occurred during the construction of the bridge. A baulk of timber fell on one man when a rope slipped, and another died when he fell from the part-completed structure, injuring himself on the staging as he fell. Only a few days after the bridge's opening, a rowing boat trying to pass underneath was caught in a giant eddy and capsized, one occupant being drowned. Over the succeeding years a number of incidents happened at the bridge involving larger vessels. The trow Brothers was lost after a collision with one of the piers in 1879, and the Victoria, employed in the bridge's construction, was wrecked in the 1880s. In 1938, a tug and two barges got into difficulties and were carried along broadside by the tide into the bridge; a connecting hawser snagged one of the piers and the vessels capsized, with several fatalities.

In 1943, a flight of three Spitfire fighter aircraft was being delivered by ATA pilots, including one woman, Ann Wood, from their factory in Castle Bromwich to Whitchurch, Bristol. As it was low tide, the lead pilot Johnnie Jordan flew under the bridge. Some time later, Ann Wood repeated this underflying – without realising that this time it was high tide and there was 30 ft (9 m) less headroom but she just squeezed through. These were not the only instances of pilots buzzing the bridge, and on one occasion a Vickers Wellington bomber, a much larger aircraft, was seen to fly under it. The practice became so common that RAF police were called in and tasked with the recording of serial numbers of offending aircraft. After a few courts-martial the incidents ceased.

== Railway operation ==
Until the Severn Road Bridge was opened in 1966, the Severn Railway Bridge was often referred to simply as the Severn Bridge. There was a small station known as Severn Bridge on the Lydney side, adjacent to the Gloucester to Newport Line, which the Severn Bridge Line crossed over. The bridge was used as a diversionary route for passenger services when the Severn Tunnel was closed for engineering work. The south-to-north chord at Berkeley Loop South Junction used for this route was closed when the bridge was abandoned. The remaining line from Berkeley Rd Junction to Sharpness Docks remains and on the north side of the Severn estuary, the line from the former Otters Pool Junction at Lydney to the Severn Bridge has long been lifted but a short section of the track exists as part of the Forest of Dean Railway network.

While the bridge provided a considerably shorter railway route from London to South Wales, its use was limited in that the route was single track, and also because the bridge was only strong enough to carry locomotives up to a 2-6-0. By the early 1960s traffic was restricted to trains serving Lydney, both passenger trains to Berkeley Road and freight to Stoke Gifford, with GWR 1600 Class locomotives typically heading the trains.

There were plans by British Railways to improve the bridge in order to provide additional capacity for diverted main line trains.

== 1960 partial collapse ==
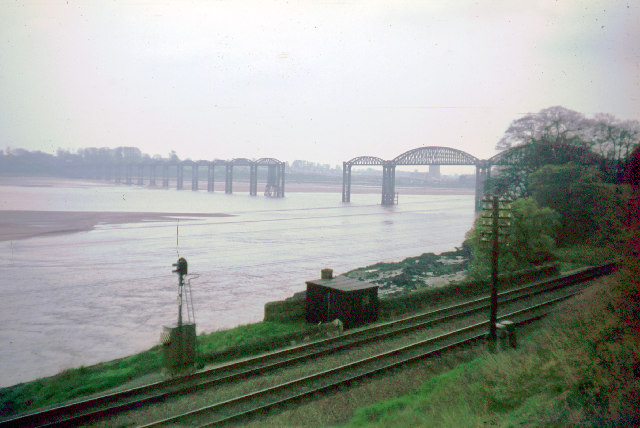
After the collapse, April 1966

On 25 October 1960, in thick fog and a strong tide, two barges, the Arkendale H and the Wastdale H, which had overshot Sharpness Dock, collided with one of the columns of the bridge after being carried upstream. Two bridge spans collapsed into the river. As they fell, parts of the structure hit the barges causing the fuel oil and petroleum they were carrying to catch fire. Five people died in the incident.

The collapse of the bridge damaged the 12-inch (30 cm)-diameter gas main that ran alongside the railway, leaving households across the Forest of Dean without a mains gas supply. Locals who were around at the time talk of people from the gas company banging on the doors early in the morning to tell people not to use their gas, and of having to be supplied with bottled gas and compatible appliances for months until the mains could be restored. Gas engineers from across the UK were brought in to help with visiting every house affected before the household could use the mains gas again.

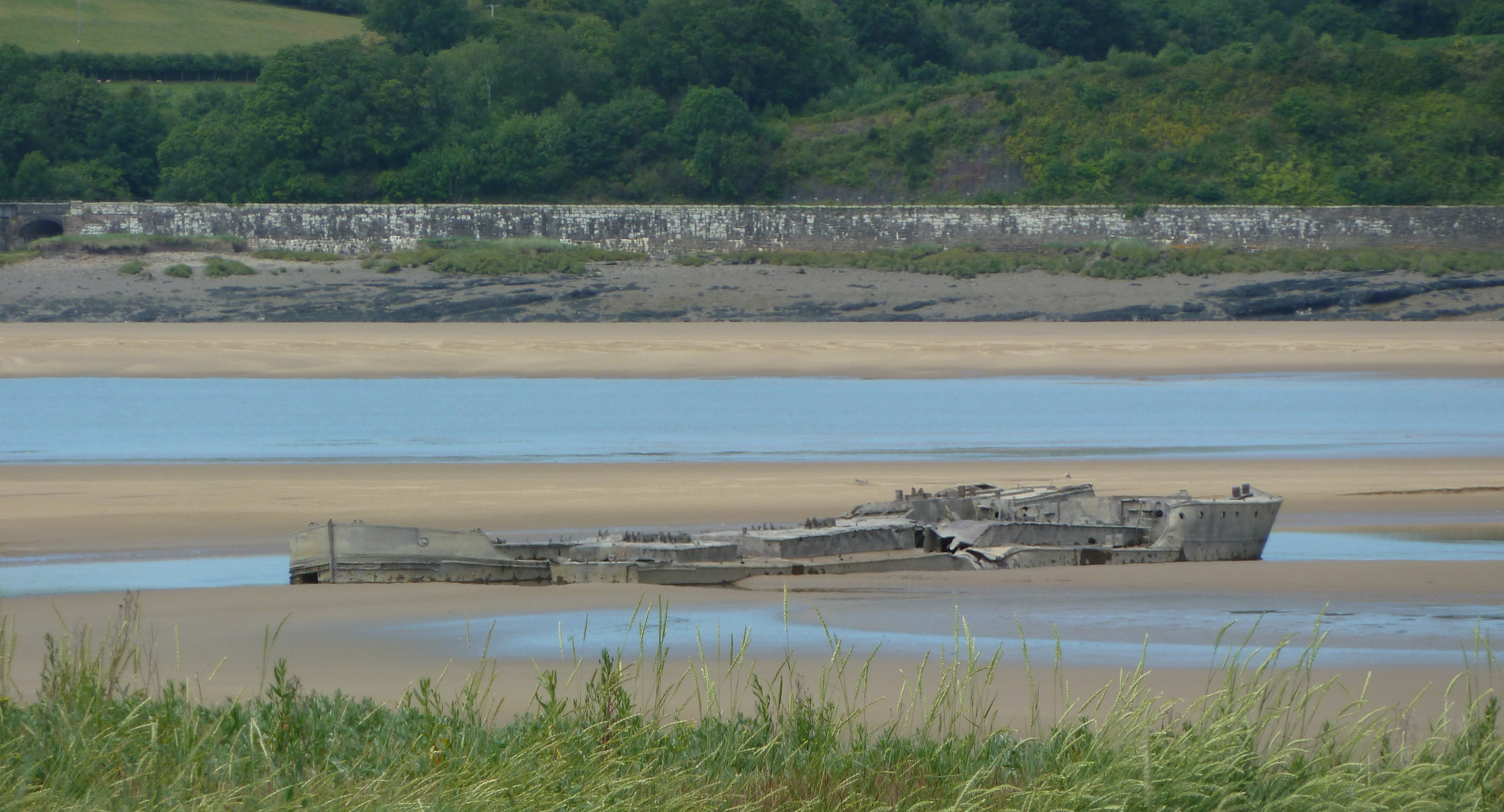
Wreckage of the barges, Arkendale H (bow, left) and Wastdale H (stern, right), still visible at low water, 2011

Local people favoured repairing the bridge because it was an important community link, in particular used by children of Sharpness to travel by train to their school at Lydney on the opposite side. The collapse meant they had to be taken on a 40-mile (64 km) detour via Gloucester. An underwater survey in December 1961 found extensive damage to Pier 16. Rebuilding costs were estimated to be £312,000 (£8.8 million in 2023), as against dismantling costs of £250,000 (£7 million in 2023).

The Western Region of British Railways planned to reconstruct the bridge but, shortly before the work was due to begin, a capsized tanker caused further damage to Pier 20, and that same pier was struck again when the contractor's crane broke adrift. Those incidents added a further £20,000 to the estimated costs of repair and, in 1965, British Railways decided that the bridge was damaged beyond economic repair and opted for demolition.

== Demolition ==
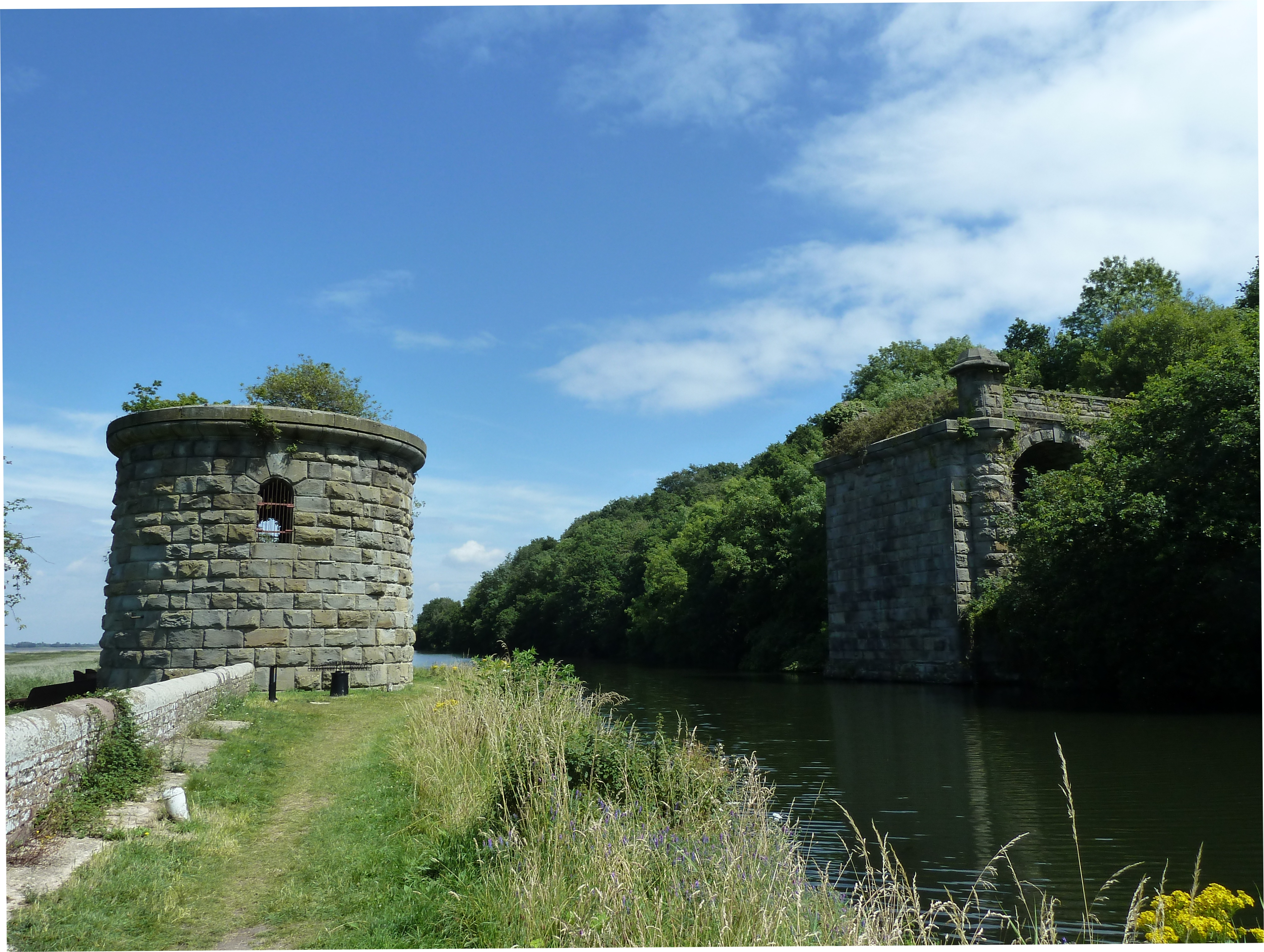
Remaining tower of the swing section over the canal, with surviving approach arch visible at right

Demolition began in August 1967. The contract was awarded to Nordman Construction after an unsuccessful tender process. The company brought in the Magnus II, a floating crane with a lifting capacity of 400 long tons (450 short tons; 410 t), which could remove all but two of the spans. These longer spans were pulled sideways off the piers, expecting that they would break into manageable pieces under their own weight. They proved stronger than this and remained intact, needing to be broken up in the river, with much sinking into the bed instead of being recovered.

In May 1968, another firm, Swinnerton & Miller, completed the main demolition work with the help of explosives, but clearing of the debris took another two years.

Evidence of several of the piers remains. The most significant is a large circular tower, sited between the canal and river. This had formed the base of the swinging section and housed the steam engine to power it. A large stone arch also remains on the landward side of the canal, the original abutment to the swinging section. Some piers reduced to their stone foundations and the wrecks of the petrol barges that caused the original damage are visible at low tide. The river at this point has always been hazardous to shipping because of the strong tidal currents, which caused the 1960 collision.

During the demolition, the support vessel Severn King, an old Aust Ferry boat that had become surplus after the new Severn road bridge replaced the ferry in 1966, broke its mooring in the tide, grounded on the remains of the bridge and flooded.

A wooden motor barge, the Halfren of 1913, was also used in the demolition work, for collecting small pieces of wreckage. Worn out by this work and the frequent groundings, it was abandoned on the shore at Aust.

== See also ==
- Crossings of the River Severn
