= Severn Bridge Railway =

UK railway line

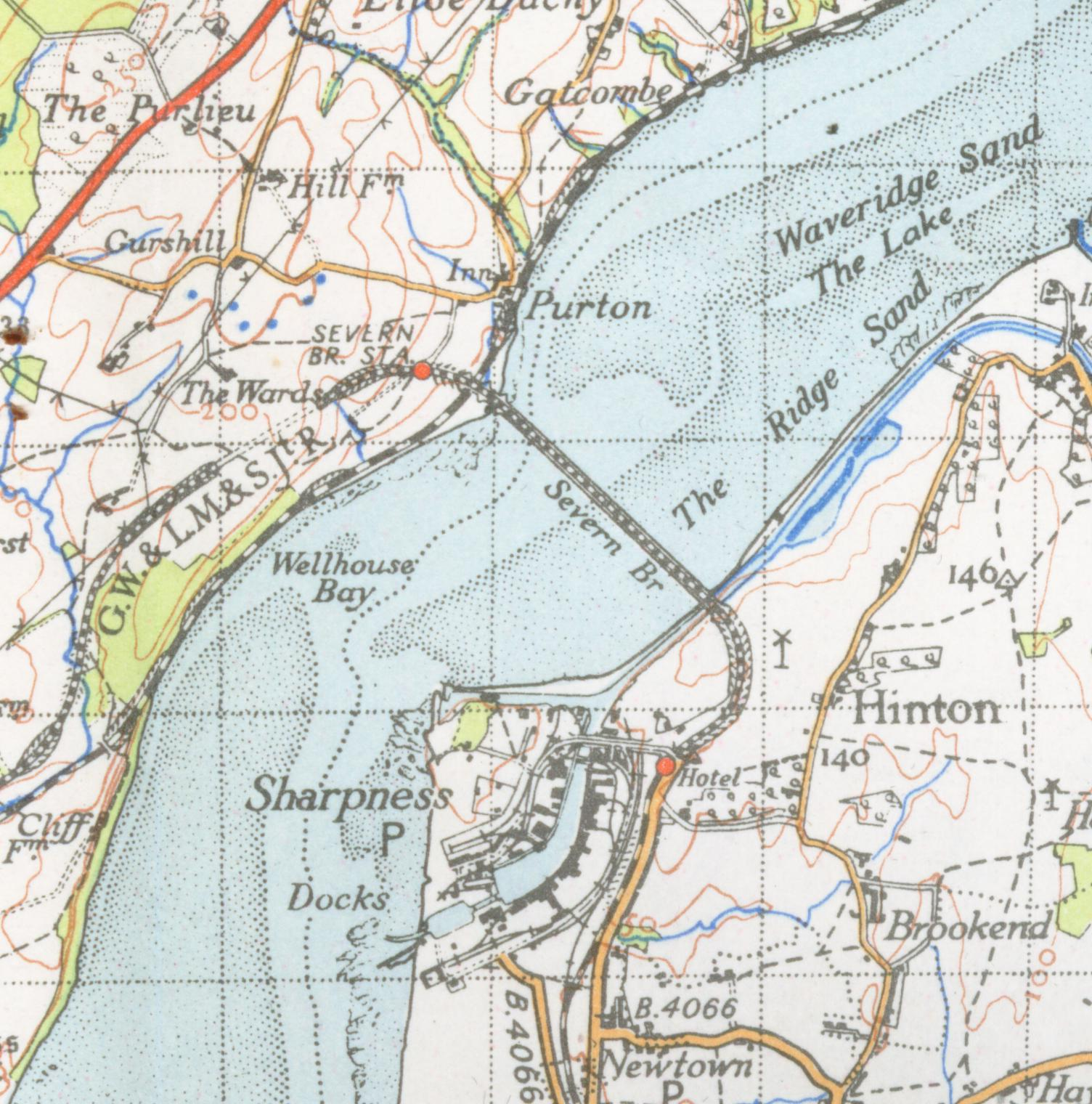
- An Ordnance Survey map of the Severn Railway Bridge from 1946

Overview
- Dates of operation: 1879–1893
- Successor: Great Western Railway and the Midland Railway

Technical
- Track gauge: 4 ft 8 1/2 in (1,435 mm) standard gauge

The Severn Bridge Railway was a railway company which constructed a railway from Lydney to Sharpness in Gloucestershire, England. It was intended chiefly to give access for minerals in the Forest of Dean to Sharpness Docks, and the company built a long bridge, 1,387 yards (1,268 m) in length, over the River Severn. The line opened in 1879.

On opening the company entered a partnership with the Severn and Wye Railway; the Sharpness branch of the Midland Railway was transferred into the group, the combined network forming the Severn and Wye and Severn Bridge Railway. The Severn Bridge Railway and the former Midland Railway branch formed the "Bridge" section of the S&WJR; the former Severn and Wye Railway formed the "Forest" section.

The line was never profitable, being dependent on the colliery activity in the Forest of Dean, and the huge construction cost of the bridge meant that there were heavy, and unaffordable, interest charges, and the S&W&SBR Company went into receivership. It was purchased by the Midland Railway and the Great Western Railway jointly, and became known as the Severn and Wye Joint Railway. When the Great Western Railway constructed the Badminton line, shortening its route from London to South Wales. a south-to-west connection was made, the Berkeley Road Loop, giving direct access from the south to Sharpness from 1908.

In 1960 two out-of-control petrol barges in the Severn struck a pier of the Severn Bridge and brought it down, severing the line. After much deliberation the decision was taken to close the line permanently and to demolish the Severn Bridge. The stub from Berkeley Road to Sharpness remains in occasional use in connection with nuclear traffic.

== Before the bridge ==
=== The first Severn Tunnel ===
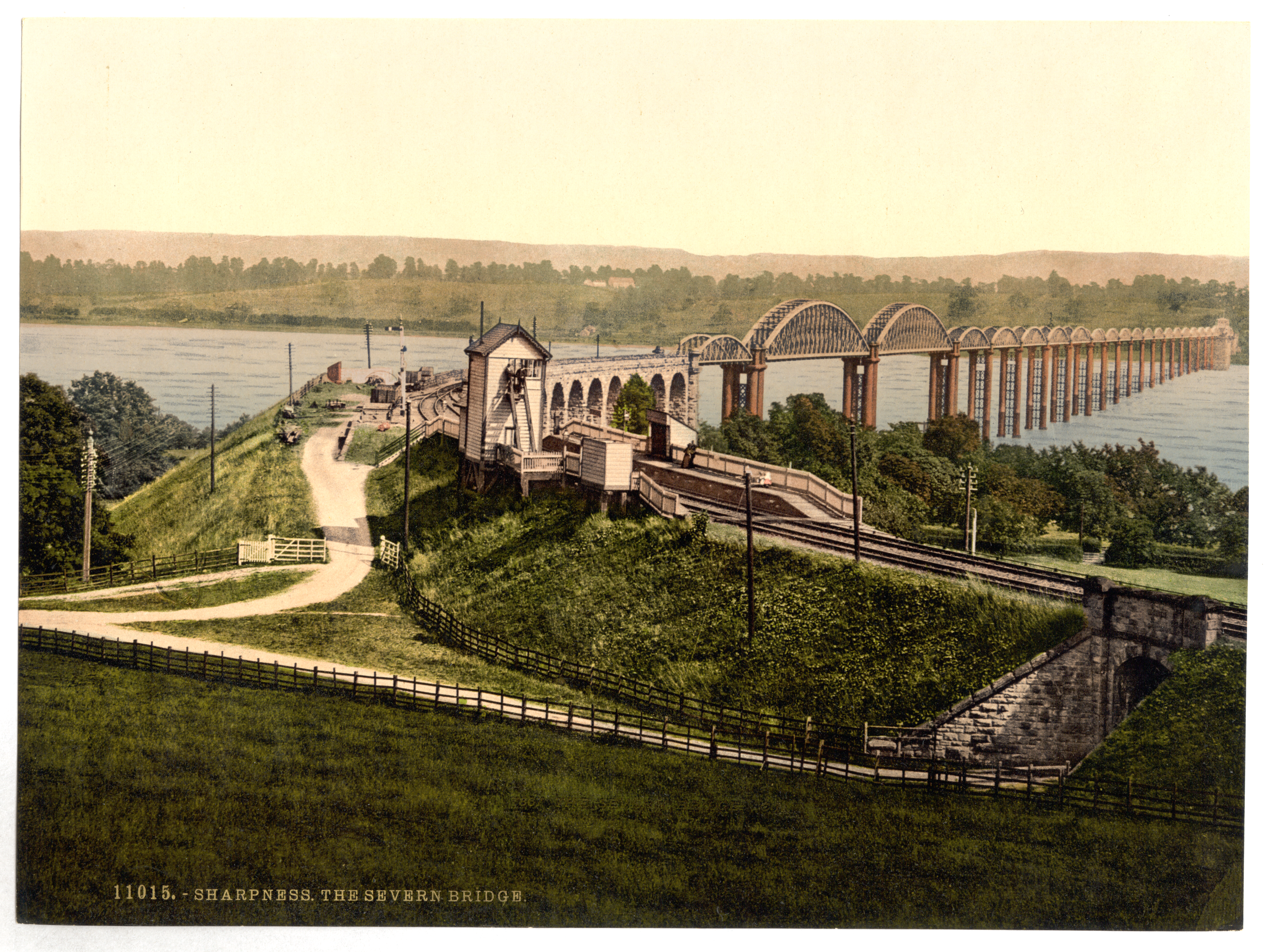
The Severn Bridge in an old postcard

Richard Wetherell, Roynon Jones the Younger, William and John Fendall and James Jelf were authorised by the Severn Tunnel Act 1810 (50 Geo. 3. c. cxxiv) to construct a road tunnel under the River Severn from a point about midway between Newnham Church and Bullo Pill to a point in the parish of Arlingham. The act, passed on 24 May 1810, incorporated the Severn Tunnel Company, with capital of £12,000. The Severn is 1,500 feet wide at the chosen point. A 12-horsepower engine was used to drain the tunnel.

By August 1811 the construction was proceeding rapidly, and "with every prospect of success". However, when the construction had reached about halfway, an inundation took place at about four in the afternoon of Friday 13 November 1812. The flooding was considered to be impossible to overcome, and the project was abandoned.

=== The South Wales Railway ===
Early on proposals were implemented to connect south and south-west Wales to the growing railway network. The South Wales Railway was promoted, and opened its first sections of route in 1850 and 1851; on 19 July 1852 the Chepstow Bridge was opened and the line was continuous from near Gloucester to Swansea, and through running from London was possible. The line was constructed on the broad gauge, and was engineered by Isambard Kingdom Brunel. In 1856 the SWR completed its line to Neyland, on Milford Haven; a ferry service was operated from Neyland to ports in the south of Ireland.

The South Wales Railway was absorbed by the Great Western Railway in 1863. Although the trunk line from Neyland and Swansea connected to the Great Western system, the heavy mineral traffic from South Wales was not greatly transferred to the line. Most of the valley railways were standard gauge, and the transfer to broad gauge wagons was heavily labour-intensive. Coal owners found it more convenient to continue to send their coal to the ports for onward transport by coastal shipping

=== Bristol and South Wales Union Railway ===
There was considerable demand for passenger journeys between Bristol and South Wales. Although the journeys could be accomplished by rail via Gloucester, this was a disproportionately circuitous route, and in 1863 the Bristol and South Wales Union Railway was opened, forming a direct railway line to a ferry pier at New Passage, near the present-day community of Severn Beach. A short spur was made on the Welsh side of the River Severn at Portskewett, connecting in to the South Wales Railway main line. In conjunction with the ferry, this made a more convenient passenger route between Bristol and South Wales.

=== Severn and Wye Railway ===
The Severn and Wye Railway had started life in 1810 as a plateway running from Lydney Docks to coal and iron ore workings in the Forest of Dean. After opening of the South Wales Railway through Lydney, the Severn and Wye Railway laid a broad gauge track alongside its plateway line from Lydney to Wimberry, a distance of about 3 miles. When the South Wales main line was converted to standard gauge, the S&WR branch was converted too.

=== Conversion of the gauge of the South Wales line ===
The proliferation of standard gauge railways serving the South Wales mineral areas emphasised the inconvenience of the broad gauge on the former South Wales Railway lines. Whatever its technical merits, the discontinuity requiring transshipment of loads was a major commercial disadvantage. The Great Western Railway decided to convert the gauge of the SWR lines and its own lines connecting with them. This was done in a large scale operation in 1872, and in a short space of time the broad gauge had been eliminated on South Wales, enabling the GWR to develop mineral haulage from the area to London, West of England and South Coast destinations.

=== Sharpness docks ===
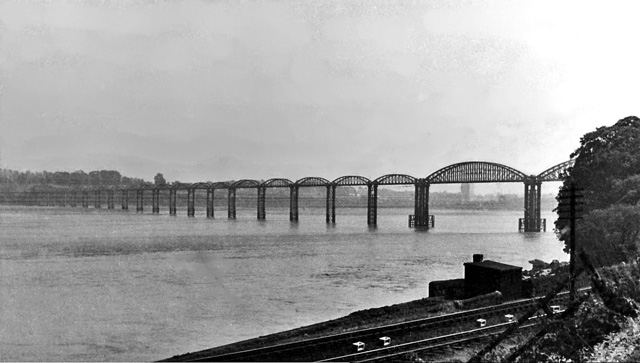
The Severn Railway Bridge, from near Purton

The Gloucester and Berkeley Canal, usually known later as the Gloucester and Sharpness Canal, was built between 1798 and 1827, to give sea-going ships access to Gloucester. It was the first ship canal in Great Britain. There was a sea lock at Sharpness, on the eastern shore of the Severn. By 1870 the canal was inadequate for the ships of the day, which discharged at Sharpness, and required to bunker. In 1871 work was started on docks at Sharpness, as a convenient place to which larger sea-going shipping could be brought. The Midland Railway was operating the main line between Bristol and Gloucester, and the Midland obtained authorisation for a branch line from Berkeley Road on that line to Sharpness.

== Crossing the Severn ==
The idea of a bridge over the River Severn had long been held. Brunel's first intention for the South Wales Railway was for the line to cross the Severn by bridge, at Hock Cliffe between Fretherne and Awre. This was strenuously opposed in Parliament in 1845 by interests in Gloucester, which strongly wished the line to pass through their city, and Brunel was obliged to take the line round through Gloucester.

In 1865 there was a sudden upsurge of interest in a bridge or tunnel; the bridge was proposed by the South Wales and Great Western Direct Railway, which proposed a line similar to the later Wootton Bassett – Badminton – Pilning line, but crossing the Severn from Oldbury Sand to Chepstow, a little north-east of the 1966 Severn Road Bridge. Because of shipping requirements at this location, the bridge had to be designed to give a high clearance over the water, and this proposal was known as the High Level Scheme. Two more groups proposed bridges further up river, near Newnham and at Hock Crib respectively.

Although these ideas gained considerable traction, all of them were withdrawn without any construction taking place.

In the latter half of 1871 a revival of interest took place, and six schemes for a Severn Railway Bridge were promoted. Some of them had ambitious connections to distant networks; the South Midland Railway would run from Lydney over the Severn to join the London and South Western Railway at Andover and Basingstoke.

== Severn Bridge Railway ==
Of the six schemes, it was the Severn Bridge Railway Bill (No. 2) that became the front runner. Its primary objective was to connect the growing Sharpness harbour with the mineral resources of the Forest of Dean. Lydney Harbour had long been outgrown, being limited to vessels of 400 tons. Sea-going vessels discharging at Sharpness or Gloucester had to move to Cardiff to bunker. As well as the internal export potential at Sharpness, the connection with the Midland Railway would give rail transit possibilities. A footway on the bridge would enable pedestrian use (but this was later omitted).

In addition it was held that the connection with the Great Western Railway, which had running powers over the Bristol line at Berkeley Road, would afford transit opportunities to the south-west of England, and shorten the GWR route from South Wales to London by 14 miles. (Note: Via Berkeley Road, reverse, and Bristol Temple Meads, reverse, compared with the GWR route via Gloucester.)

The promoters relied

on the traffic of the immediate district as the undoubted justification for the line, and believed that it alone would be quite adequate to provide a remunerative dividend on the cost of the undertaking; but at the same time they could not ignore the prospects of the exceptional returns which they believed would result from the accommodation of through traffic.

Severn Bridge Railway Act 1872
- Act of Parliament
- Parliament of the United Kingdom
- Long title: An Act to authorise the construction of a Railway from the South Wales Railway, in the parish of Lydney, across the River Severn, to Holly Hazle Brook, in the parish of Berkeley, with Branches; and for other purposes.
- Citation: 35 & 36 Vict. c. cix

Dates
- Royal assent: 18 July 1872

After several days in parliamentary committee, during which the bridge was modified to increase the span of the bridge sections so as to reduce the propensity to silt, the bill received royal assent as the Severn Bridge Railway Act 1872 (35 & 36 Vict. c. cix) on 18 July 1872. It was to build from Lydney, making junctions there with the GWR and the Severn and Wye Railway, to the planned Sharpness branch of the Midland Railway at Sharpness itself. The authorised capital was £225,000.

The previous month, on 27 June 1872, the Severn Tunnel Railway had been authorised to build from near Caldicot to near Pilning on the Bristol and South Wales Union line.

=== Getting subscriptions and construction ===
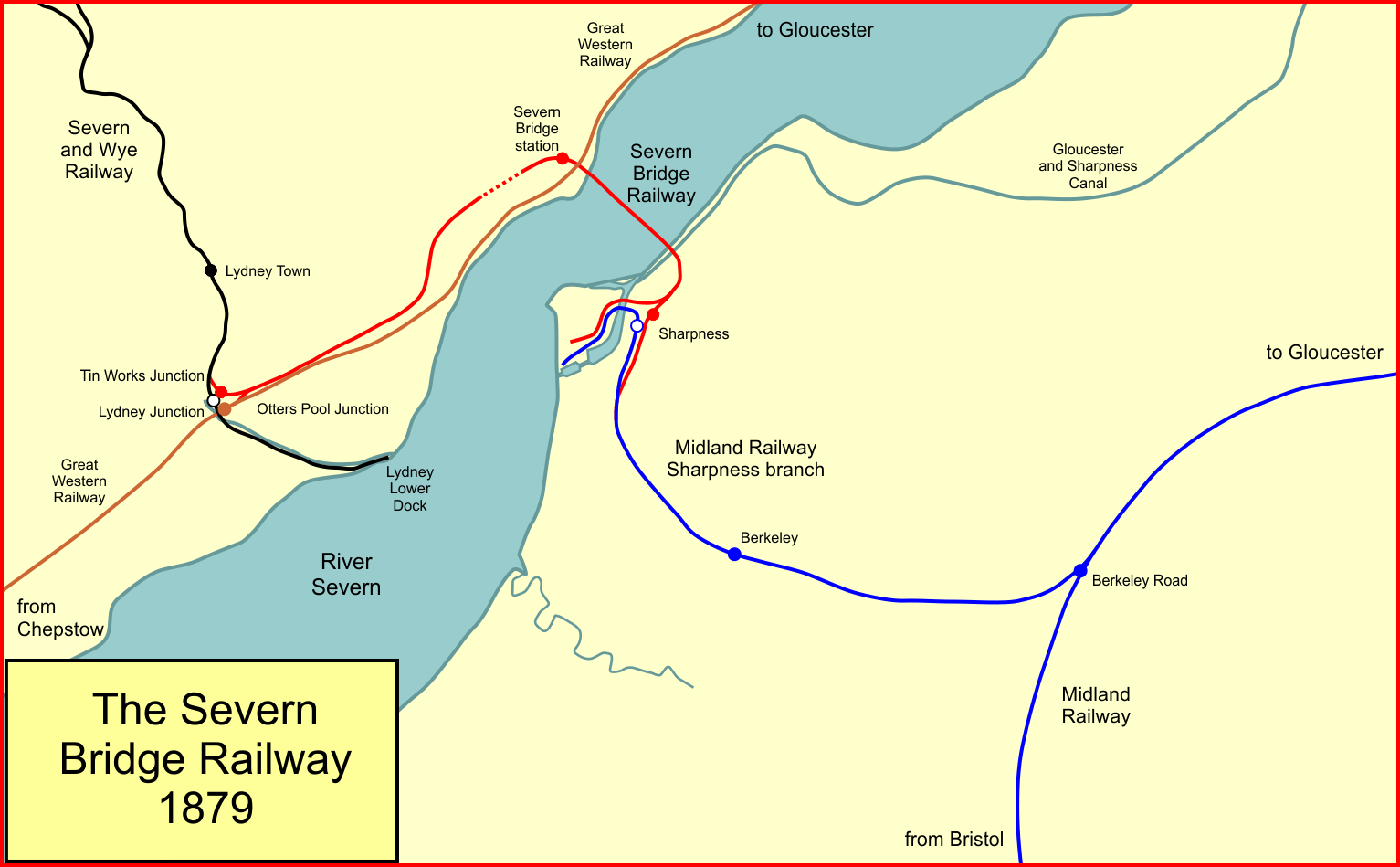
The Severn Bridge Railway system

The estimated cost of construction of the Severn Bridge Railway was £227,973. (Note: The estimated cost of construction probably did not include land acquisition costs, and might not have included station construction, signalling, staff uniforms and accommodation, and company secretariat etc.) The new company held its first shareholders' meeting on 31 August 1872. It was declared that amicable relations were intended with the Great Western Railway and the Midland Railway, but that the GWR had remained aloof. The hoped-for amicable relations of course meant financial support. The Midland Railway saw that the bridge would give them access to the Forest of Dean mineral sites, and agreed to subscribe £50,000. The GWR was supporting the newly authorised Severn Tunnel project; moreover the GWR had a monopoly of access to the Forest of Dean's mineral resources; that monopoly would be lost when the bridge was built.

The GWR challenged the Midland's subscription of £50,000 as being ultra vires, but arbitration led to its approval. The Gloucester and Berkeley Canal (later known as the Gloucester and Sharpness Canal, (Note: The Gloucester and Berkeley Canal had opened in 1827 and in 1872 had only just paid off a heavy and long-standing loan for its own construction works.) subscribed £50,000 and the Severn and Wye Railway £25,000.

The bridge construction contract was let to the Hamilton Windsor Iron Works of Liverpool in March 1875, in the amount of £190,000, and Vickers and Cook of London were awarded the railway works contract, valued at £90,000. T. E. Harrison was the engineer.

The bridge was to consist of 21 wrought iron bowstring girder spans, with an additional swing bridge at the eastern end crossing the Gloucester and Sharpness Canal, which ran broadly parallel to the river. There was a 12-arch masonry viaduct approaching the bridge at the western side, and two such arches at the eastern side.

The Sharpness branch of the Midland Railway opened on 2 August 1875 to goods traffic, and to passengers on 1 August 1876.

It was only just before this date, on 3 July 1875 that work started on the Severn Bridge Railway. As well as the construction at Garston (near Liverpool) of the bridge spans, the cylinders for the piers needed to be sunk at site. On the eastern side a sand bank called the ridge was in existence, consisting of a mixture of sand and clay, about 30 feet thick. This proved exceptionally difficult to drive the piles by conventional means, and a special method was adopted in which water was pumped down a hollow tube; the water issuing at the lower end removed the clay material there and enabled the driving process to proceed.

When the piles were driven it was possible to found the pier cylinders on the underlying rock, and then remove the sand and other material from the interior by conventional hand excavation techniques. The cylinder sections were bolted on progressively, and the whole was later filled with concrete.

Temporary staging could now be erected to support the truss erection process; the trusses were assembled using service bolts, and portable forges were employed on the staging to facilitate the process of riveting the joints.

In February 1876 it was decided to make the swing bridge over the canal double track; it was argued that to do this later if traffic increased would be exceptionally difficult.

The rapid velocity of the current and the tidal range made the work difficult as the navigation channel spans were attempted, and a number of losses of staging, and in some case pier cylinders, were encountered.

The railway approaches too, including the tunnel, had experienced difficulty, and due to very slow progress the work was taken from Vickers and Cooke and allocated to Gareth Griffiths of Lydney in 1878.

The bridge was completed in August 1879 and permanent way installation commenced on the bridge. L-section guard rails were provided. The bridge superstructure was painted cream, while the piers were painted chocolate above the water line and black below.

=== Powers for more borrowing ===
Severn Bridge Railway Act 1877
- Act of Parliament
- Parliament of the United Kingdom
- Long title: An Act for conferring additional powers on the Severn Bridge Railway Company; and for other purposes.
- Citation: 40 & 41 Vict. c. cxlviii

Dates
- Royal assent: 2 August 1877

Text of statute as originally enacted

In 1877 a bill was submitted for powers to take more borrowing, to confirm the double track on the swing bridge, and for additional fender protection for the piers on the river channel, and for "the provision of stations, rails, and signals". It was passed as the Severn Bridge Railway Act 1877 (40 & 41 Vict. c. cxlviii). The additional capital needed was £100,000, a 44% increase on the original capital.

=== Proposed amalgamation ===
The Severn Bridge Railway, when completed, would be a small concern located between two very powerful networks. The neighbouring Severn and Wye Railway was also considered vulnerable, and in the 1878 session of Parliament a bill was presented for amalgamating the two. Although, as pointed out by the GWR, the SBR had not yet been completed, the bill was passed on 21 July 1878. It was to take effect on completion of the SBR line. The two companies would remain in existence, and the combined undertaking would be known as the Severn & Wye and Severn Bridge Railway, with a complex system of allocation of cost and profit between the sections.

The arrangement was authorised by the Severn and Wye and Severn Bridge Railway Companies Act 1879 (42 & 43 Vict. c. clxiii) of 21 July 1879; the two companies were not dissolved: the new company was jointly owned by them.

=== Ready at last ===
The Severn Bridge Railway was inspected by Colonel Rich of the Board of Trade on 3 and 4 October 1879. A deflection test was undertaken by loading the bridge with eight borrowed locomotives, and the test proved satisfactory, a 1.5 inch deflection being recorded on the longest spans.

On 3 September 1879 a special train for directors of the company crossed the bridge. The line was accordingly opened on 17 October 1879. A train consisting of 20 first class coaches passed over the bridge from Sharpness to Lydney and returned, stopping before the bridge to allow those who wished to cross on foot to do so.

At weekends the bridge was opened to the general public on foot, pending the start of railway operation.

The Severn Bridge itself was 1,387 yards in length and 70 feet above high water. In addition there was a swing bridge 196 feet long over the Gloucester and Sharpness Canal. There was a branch 57 chains in length to Sharpness docks, duplicating the Midland Railway branch.

=== Full opening ===
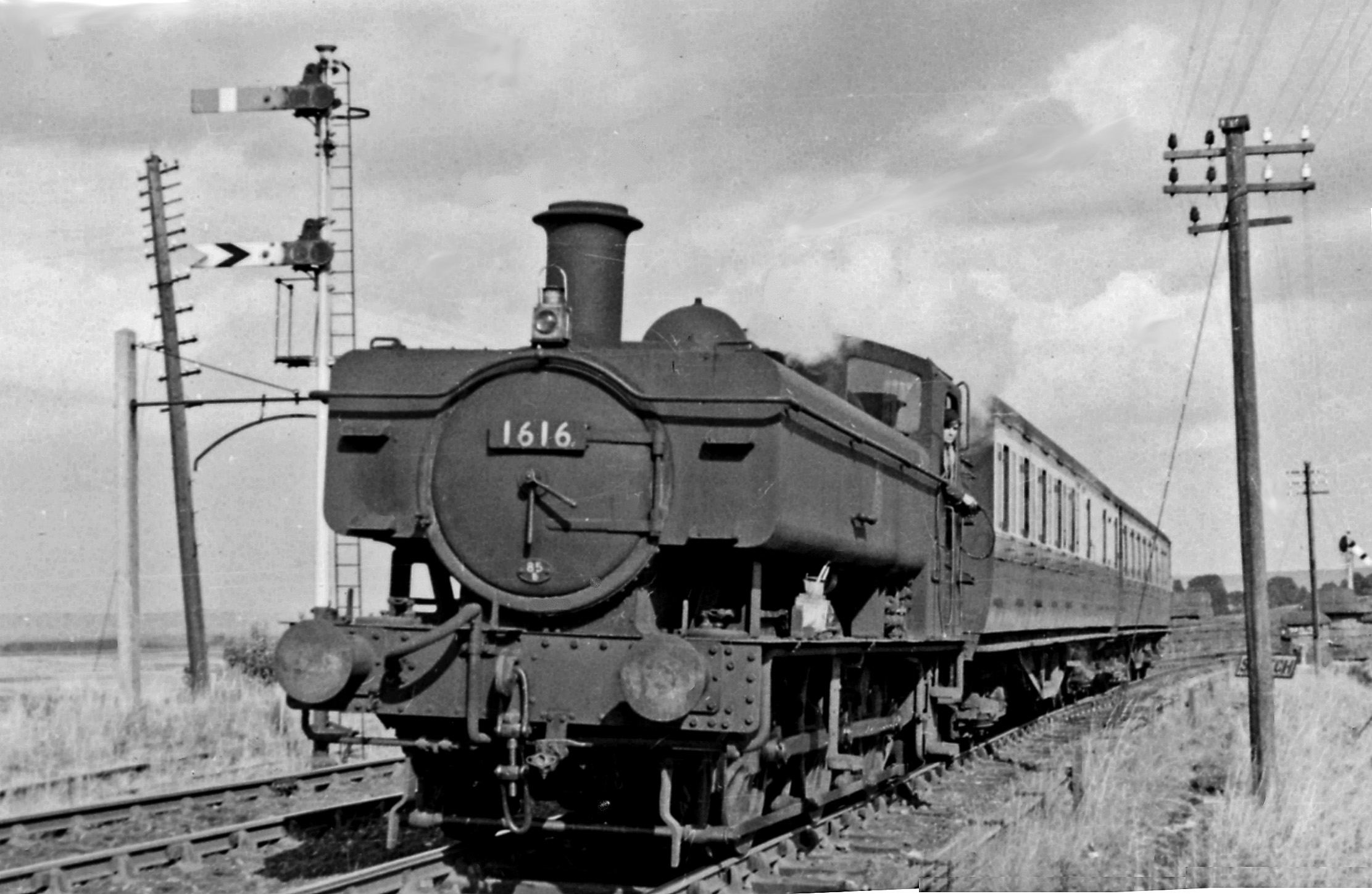
A train bound for Lydney at Severn Bridge station, looking east

A ceremonial opening of the railway took place on Friday 17 October 1879, when a further special train crossed the bridge and returned, setting the scene for speeches and a sumptuous banquet. The ordinary service followed, consisting of six trains each way every weekday; it appears that the trains ran through from Berkeley Road to Lydney Town. There was one short working from Sharpness to Lydney Town and back, and two of the trains were mixed. A 15 mph speed limit was in force on the bridge.

As agreed, on the opening day of the SBR it and the S&WR company merged. The joint share capital of the two concerns was £415,400, and there were loans of £18,500. The new company was known as the Severn and Wye and Severn Bridge Joint Railway. It owned eight locomotives, 26 wagons and four coaches.

== Portskewett Pier fire ==
Notwithstanding the opening of the Severn Bridge, the normal route for GWR passengers between Bristol and South Wales remained the ferry crossing from New Passage to Portskewett, accessed at the Bristol end by the former Bristol and South Wales Union line, and by a short branch at Portskewett.

On 23 May 1881 the Portskewett ferry pier was destroyed by fire, and GWR passengers were conveyed by train from Bristol via Berkeley Road, the Severn Bridge, and Lydney. In fact the journey was 25 minutes quicker than by ferry. However the pier was quickly given temporary repairs and was in use again from 15 June 1881; the ferry service was resumed and the train diversion ceased, "to the sorrow of passengers".

This was also to the sorrow of S&W&SBR shareholders, who lost welcome income: the GWR was invited to continue the service after the restoration of the pier, but they declined.

== Poor financial performance ==
As a small local railway, the Severn Bridge Railway with its partner the Severn and Wye Railway struggled to make a profit. There was a widespread depression in the mineral business, resulting in repeated and prolonged strikes among the miners when wage reductions were imposed, and loss of traffic to the company.

Hope was kept alive to make the line part of a trunk route from South Wales to London, and a bold scheme was put forward to build a new connecting line to join the Gloucester to Swindon line, but this fell through.

In 1883 the directors had to inform a shareholders' meeting that debentures falling due shortly could not be discharged. The combined company was not commercially successful, and went into administration. A scheme of arrangement with its creditors was agreed in 1885, but the line continued in difficult financial circumstances. The apportionment of income and costs between the Bridge section and the Forest (S&WR) section of the combined company, and between debenture holders and ordinary and preference shareholders continued to be a source of antagonism. In addition much expenditure was necessary in modernising the S&WR section infrastructure, and in dredging at Lydney. In addition the Forest collieries and iron workings were constantly uncompetitive, and as the railway was wholly dependent on the success or failure of those industries, decline was unstoppable.

== Severn Tunnel ==
The Severn Tunnel had been authorised by Parliament in the same year as the Severn Bridge Railway. However the construction took a considerable time, and it opened fully to goods trains in September 1886 and for all traffic on 1 December 1886. The opening of that line to main line standards finally did away with any hopes that the Severn Bridge might form a trunk link between South Wales and the eastern parts of the GWR.

== Sale to the GWR and Midland Railway ==
In July 1893 it again became obvious that the company would be unable to pay debenture interest falling due, and the company immediately went into administration. There was no hope of escaping by the company's own efforts, and sale to the GWR and the Midland Railway together was found to be the only way out. A price was agreed, at £477,300. The SBR and the S&WR together had cost £951,349 to construct. Ordinary shareholders were to get 12%.

Part of the arrangement was that the Midland Railway would transfer a half share in their Sharpness branch and in their dock facilities at Sharpness to the GWR, and the whole line from Berkeley Road to Lydney and the S&WR network would be worked as a single joint entity.

Great Western and Midland Railways (Severn and Wye and Severn Bridge Railway) Act 1894
- Act of Parliament
- Parliament of the United Kingdom
- Long title: An Act for vesting in the Great Western and Midland Railway Companies the undertaking of the Severn and Wye and Severn Bridge Railway Company and for other purposes.
- Citation: 57 & 58 Vict. c. clxxxix

Dates
- Royal assent: 17 August 1894

Text of statute as originally enacted

This was ratified by the Great Western and Midland Railways (Severn and Wye and Severn Bridge Railway) Act 1894 (57 & 58 Vict. c. clxxxix) on 17 August 1894 having been operated on that basis from 1 July. The line was now in joint ownership, known as the Severn and Wye Joint Railway. The Midland Railway was responsible for track and signalling maintenance, and the Great Western Railway dealt with the operation, taking over the line's locomotives. (Note: Some through goods workings to Sharpness were worked by Midland Railway locomotives, and for a period the Midland Railway operated a Gloucester to Lydney passenger trains, worked by a Midland 0-4-4T locomotive.) Most of the S&W&SBR locomotives were named after Robin Hood and his band but "none of these possessed any features of interest".

== Badminton line ==
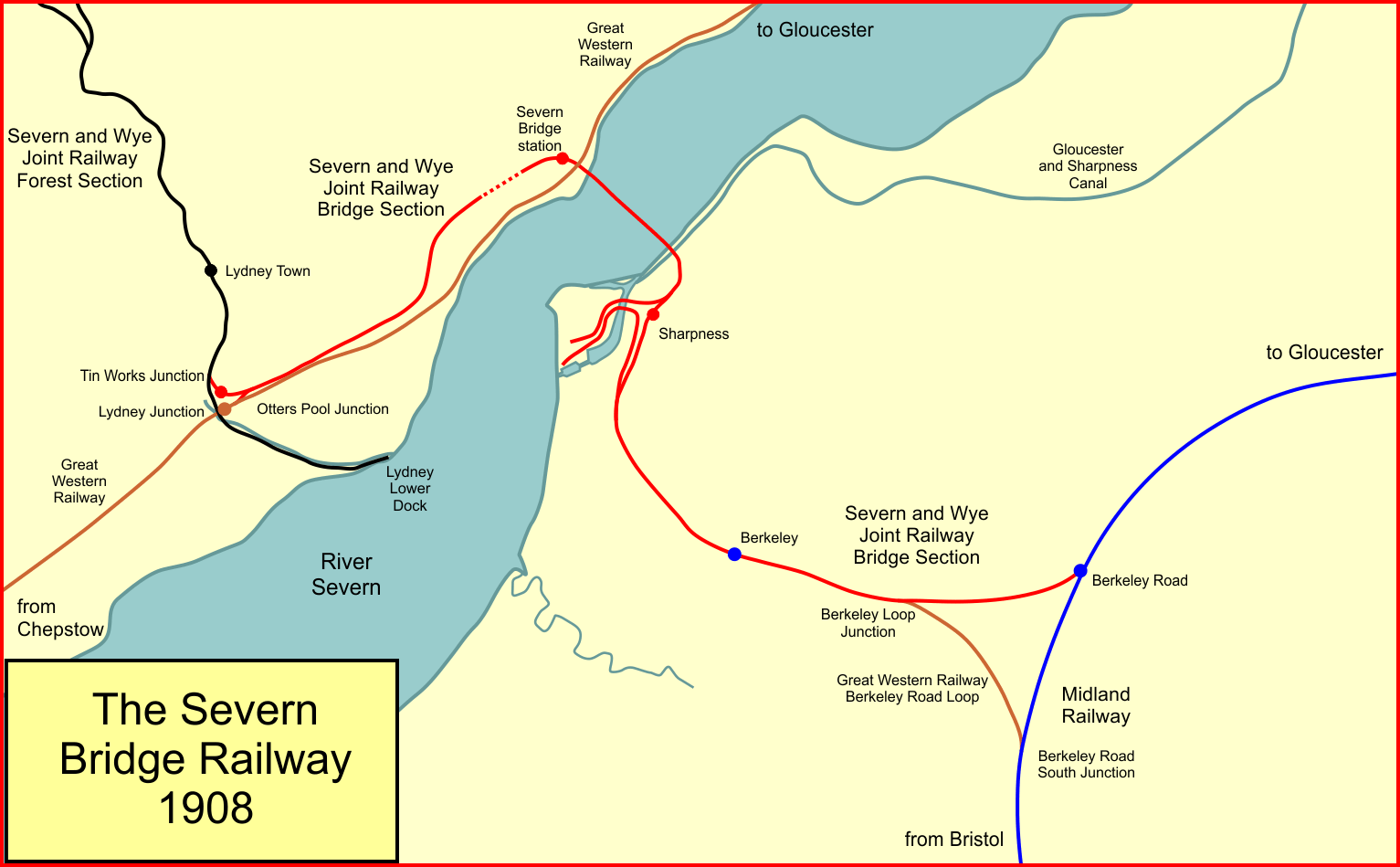
The Severn Bridge system after opening of the Badminton line

In 1896 the Great Western Railway laid before Parliament proposals to build a new cut-off line, shortening the route from London to South Wales. The new line, later generally known as the Badminton Line, (Note: Formally the South Wales & Bristol Direct Railway.) was to run from Wootton Bassett to Patchway. The GWR also proposed an independent line from the Badminton line to the Severn and Wye line near Sharpness. This would have paralleled part of the Midland Railway Bristol to Gloucester route, and was opposed in Parliament by the Midland. The GWR already had running powers over the relevant portion of the Bristol to Gloucester line, and a compromise was reached. The GWR would build curves from the Badminton line to the Midland route at Yate, and a south curve at Berkeley Road ("the Berkeley Road Loop") giving south-to-west access off the Bristol and Gloucester line to Sharpness. These curves were duly authorised, and they were opened on 9 March 1908. (Note: Gough gives 2 March 1908 and calls it the Berkeley Loop.) The loop was wholly owned by the GWR. The loops at Westerleigh formed a triangle giving access towards Swindon as well as towards Stoke Gifford. Mitchell and Smith say that the Berkeley Road loop "was opened purely as a diversionary route for use when the Severn Tunnel was closed". The low load capacity of the Severn Bridge frustrated any contemplated use of the route for heavy trains between South Wales and London.

== Grouping of the railways ==
In 1923 the railways of Great Britain were "grouped" under the Railways Act 1921, forming four large railway companies. The Great Western Railway was re-formed, absorbing a number of smaller railways; the Midland Railway was a constituent of a new London Midland and Scottish Railway (LMS). The joint line status of the Severn and Wye and Severn Bridge network continued, now jointly under the GWR and the LMS.

== Singling of the former Midland branch ==
The Midland Railway built its Sharpness branch from Berkeley Road as a double track line. The traffic on the line proved not to be so heavy as to warrant that provision, and on 26 July 1931 the line was singled.

== Nationalisation ==
On 1 January 1948 the GWR and the LMS, in common with all other main line railways in Great Britain, were taken into national ownership, following the Transport Act 1947; British Railways operated the lines. In this period the typical locomotive power on the line was tank engines of the 14XX class, or 0-6-0 pannier tanks.

== Weight limits on the bridge ==
The engine route availability on the bridge since the Grouping had been "yellow", meaning that only the lightest locomotives could traverse the bridge. Special authorisation was given for the 63XX class of 2-6-0 locomotive to use the bridge during the periods when the Severn Tunnel was closed for maintenance. South Wales to London trains generally ran via Gloucester during these closures.

This limitation had long been a source of difficulty in exploiting the bridge, but the LMS, which was responsible for the bridges, had been against relaxing the limitation. In 1955 proposals for investigating the strength of the bridges were developed, and in the following year strain gauge tests were carried out on the Severn Bridge and also all the ordinary metal underbridges on the diversionary route.

On July 15 and 22, "Castle" class locomotives Nos. 5018, "St Mawes" and 5042, "Winchester Castle", were engaged in a series of tests... After they had propelled a 500-ton load of ballast wagons on to the bridge, the locomotives made several runs over the spans on the western (Lydney) side. The eastern section of the bridge, which includes the opening span over the Gloucester & Berkeley Ship Canal, was tested on the second Sunday. At present, former G.W.R. 2-6-0s are the heaviest locomotives used on the Sunday trains between Bristol and South Wales, which are diverted to this route while the Severn Tunnel is closed for inspection and maintenance repairs.

In fact the strain gauges were malfunctioning on 15 July and a further test run, with only no 5018, was undertaken on 1 August. High secondary stresses were observed in the diagonal bracing members and it was decided to deal with that. A contract was let in the sum of £125,000 for the work.

== Damage and closure ==
=== Struck by barges ===
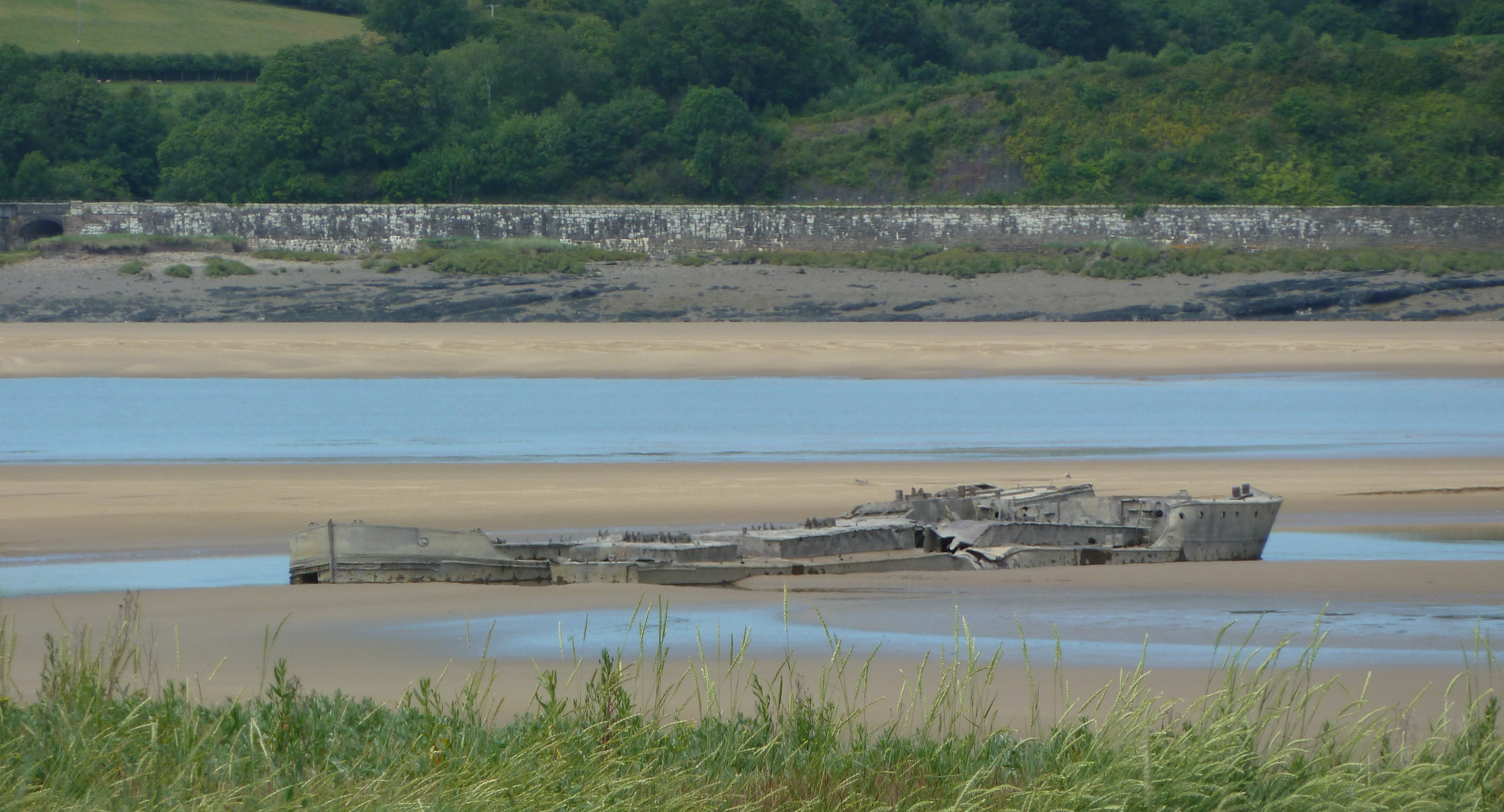
Wrecks of the Arkendale H and Wastdale H

The strengthening work had been completed on 18 spans and work was proceeding on the remainder when the bridge was struck and badly damaged, 30 minutes after the passage of the last passenger train on 25 October 1960. Two barges in the River Severn were out of control in thick fog and struck pier 17, bringing down the pier and the two spans it supported. The vessels were the Wastdale H and the Arkendale H. The displaced spans fell on to the barges and ignited their petrol and oil cargo. In the conflagration, five crew members of the barges died.

Still out of control the barges continued upstream on the flood tide and grounded on sandbanks, still carrying 70 yards or so of fallen railway track on their decks.

The Chief Civil Engineer of British Railways, Western Region, gave an account of the course of events, summarised from a Board of Admiralty inquiry. A fleet of 26 barges was brought up from Avonmouth:

In very thick fog on the Shepherdine Sands, the fleet of some 26 barges, as was their normal practice, swung round nose to the flow of the rising tide, and went upstream for some two miles, at which point the intention was that they would go forward on their engines into Sharpness Docks. These two particular barges however missed the lights and bells which are provided for navigation purposes, and found their way into the old harbour, some quarter of a mile further up the river, and about a quarter of a mile from the bridge itself. They lay in the slack water in the old harbour and then decided separately to go out in the stream and navigate towards the dock entrance. Unfortunately one of the barges came out, the other followed it, and they came into contact side by side.

There seems to have been some confusion about how to disengage them from one another and:

because the power of their engines only gave a speed of one knot in excess of the [tidal current], they went further out in the stream and went side by side up the river and were swinging round again when they struck [the bridge pier].

=== Stabilising the bridge ===
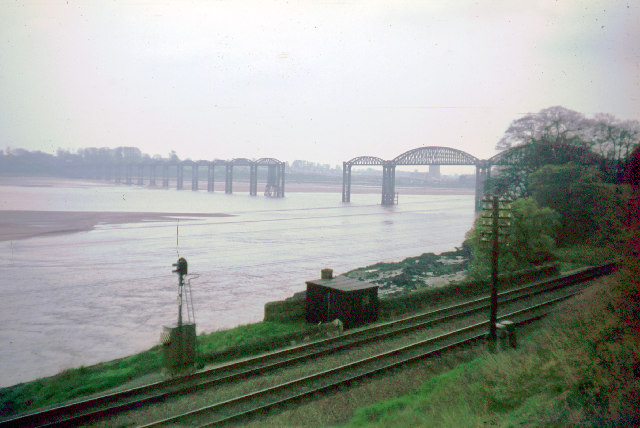
The bridge after the collision

Two spans collapsed. On the morning following the fall, the first Lydney to Sharpness passenger train ran via Gloucester, but the service was then suspended. On 27 October 1960 a passenger service between Berkeley Road and Sharpness was instituted. This continued until 7 September 1964, when the branch was closed to passenger traffic.

A pier adjacent to the fallen pier needed to be stabilised, and this was done by driving a timber pier to support it. During the course of this work, the barge carrying the contractor's piling rig broke away at night when it was anchored unmanned. Again in flood tide conditions to travelled upstream. The Resident Engineer commandeered a power launch and tried to board the barge and take control, but his propellers were fouled by trailing ropes and he was unable to do so. The barge then drifted downstream on the subsequent ebb tide, and the crane jib struck the bridge, causing the collapse of the crane jib.

Shortly after this another barge engaged in the work was carried upstream and struck one of the other piers, demolishing the fenders but causing little damage to the piers themselves. Passing the bridge upstream, it later moved downstream again and struck one of the columns, removing about 8 square feet of the cast-iron caisson. The barge capsized three or four miles downstream with total loss of life.

=== Insurance ===
The question of insurance arose; at the time the matter was governed by marine insurance law, which limited the compensation according to the weight of the vessel doing the damage. British Railways received less than £5,000 in compensation. The gas board also had a 12-inch gas main fixed to the bridge; they had to lay a new one of about 15 miles in extent, and they received less compensation than British Railways. The contractor who lost compressors and plant to a value in excess of £10,000 received less than £100 in compensation.

=== Further damage to the bridge ===
On 17 February 1961 the tanker BP Explorer capsized on approaching Sharpness. Out of control, it drifted upstream with the tide, passing the bridge; it struck pier 20 on travelling downstream again on the ebb tide. Its entire crew was lost, and damage to the extent of £12,740 was caused to the bridge.

Two floating cranes had been brought in to assist with the repair work to the bridge; they were the Tweedledum and Tweedledee. On 14 April 1961 they broke away from their moorings on the flood tide and passed above the bridge, then striking the dolphins of pier 20 on the way down on the following ebb tide. The jib of one of the cranes struck the superstructure of the bridge.

=== Closure of the Berkeley Road Loop ===
The Berkeley Road Loop had been built by the Great Western Railway when the Badminton line was opened. It had been used by South Wales-to-Bristol trains at weekends when the Severn Tunnel was closed for repairs. Any residual goods train access to Sharpness could be accommodated via Gloucester, and as staffing of two signalboxes was necessary to use the loop, it was decided to close it. The closure took place in 1963.

=== Demolition ===
Some considerable time was spent in deciding on the future of the bridge, and a contract was let to commence restoration. However eventually it was decided to demolish the bridge instead. When 24 contractors' firms were invited to quote for the work, 21 of them declined to accept the work. Of the three who quoted, one contractor quoted about £750,000 and another over £200,000. A third quoted about £75,000.

This cheapest quotation was accepted, and the firm used a Magnus II salvage crane on hire from Ulrich Harms of Hamburg. Nineteen spans were successfully dismantled, but there remained two larger spans of 108 feet. These were beyond the capacity of the crane, and they were cut so as to fracture when pulled off the supporting piers. Unfortunately when this was done they fell but did not fracture. Only about a quarter of the ironwork of these spans was recovered.

After the completion of removal of the superstructure there remained the problem of removing the concrete-filled columns down to 20 feet below water level in the area of navigation. Demolition of the masonry approach viaduct too became much delayed; it was eventually dropped by explosives on 10 March 1968.

It was at this stage that the contractor got into financial difficulties and on 20 November 1968 went into liquidation. British Railways continued the work by direct labour, using the firm of Swinnerton and Miller for explosive demolition.

=== Further shipping disaster ===
In 1969 a small former car ferry, the Severn King, was employed in assisting with the demolition work and on 4 July she broke adrift and became impaled on the stump of pier no. 2. It was necessary to wait for a spring tide high enough to refloat her, and this was done on 28 July; the Severn King was beached at Sharpness and cut up there.

=== Swing bridge demolition ===
The final stage of removal of the bridge structure was the demolition of the Sharpness swing bridge, and this was completed on 13 May 1970.

== Current use ==
The Sharpness branch from Berkeley Road was still in use in 2011; Railway magazine reported: "The branch still sees use by occasional DRS trains serving the former Berkeley nuclear power station and the operational Oldbury Magnox station."

== Topography ==
Station list:

- Berkeley Road; Midland Railway station (opened 8 July 1844); closed 4 January 1965;
- Berkeley; opened 1 August 1876; closed 2 November 1964;
- Sharpness; opened by Midland Railway 1 August 1876; relocated to SBR line 16 October 1879; closed 2 November 1964;
- Severn Bridge; opened 20 October 1879; closed 26 October 1960; the local community is named "Purton" but this was not used for the station because of the existing station near Swindon.
- tunnel; 508 yards;
- Otters Pool Junction; connection from Severn Bridge towards Chepstow;
- Lydney Junction; S&WR station opened 23 September 1875; relocated to SBR line 20 October 1879; SBR section closed 26 October 1960;
- Tin Works Junction; convergence with S&WR main line.

Berkeley Road Loop: Great Western Railway:

- Berkeley Road South Junction; on former Midland Railway line from Gloucester to Bristol;
- Berkeley Loop Junction; on former Severn Bridge Railway route towards Sharpness.

== See also ==
- Severn Railway Bridge
