= Sharpness, Gloucestershire =

Coordinates: 51.723°N 2.478°W

Sharpness
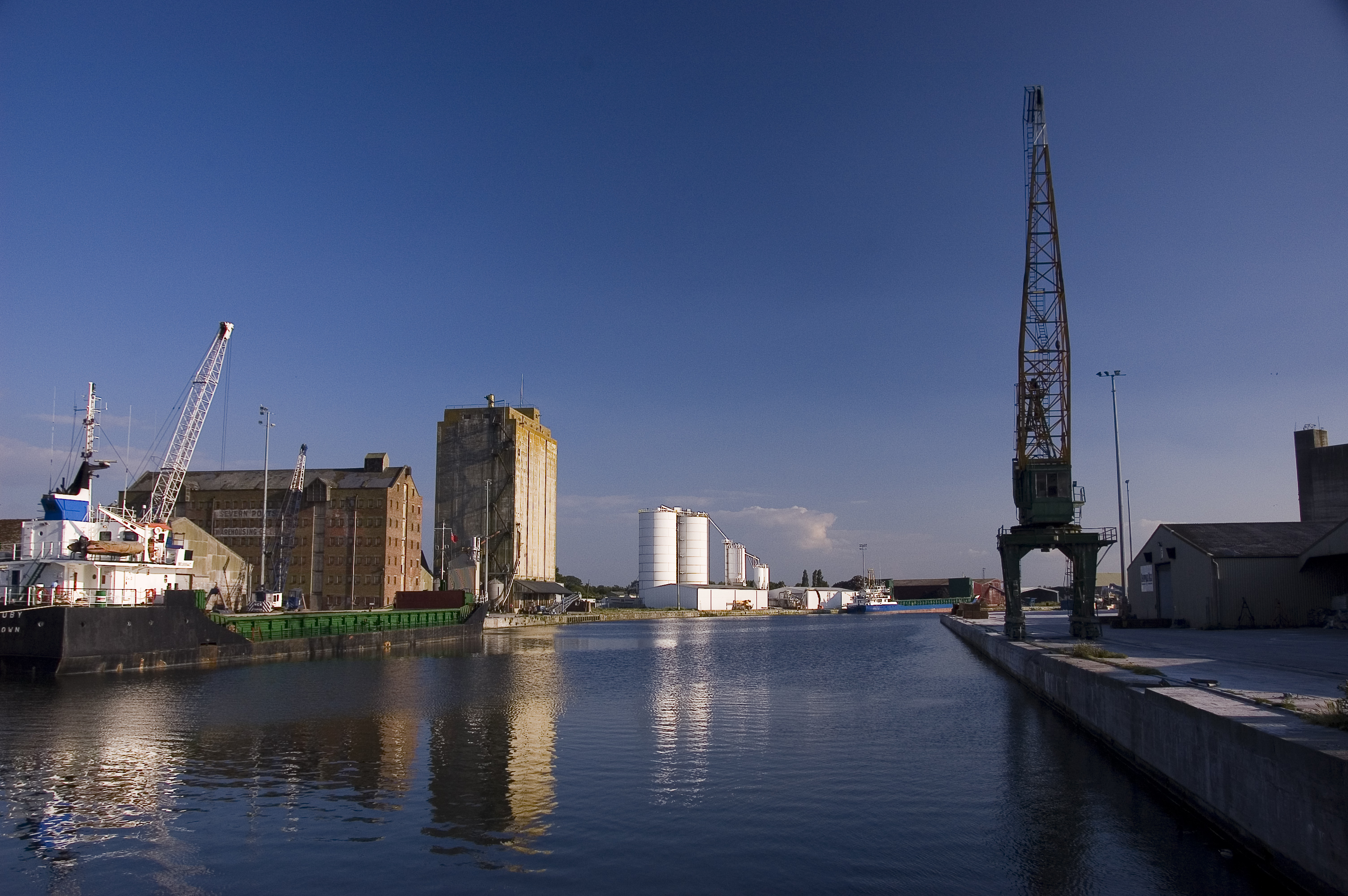
- The main dock

- Location within Gloucestershire
- OS grid reference: ST675024
- Civil parish: Hinton
- District: Stroud
- Shire county: Gloucestershire
- Region: South West
- Country: England
- Sovereign state: United Kingdom
- Post town: BERKELEY
- Postcode district: GL13
- Dialling code: 01453
- Police: Gloucestershire
- Fire: Gloucestershire
- Ambulance: South Western
- UK Parliament: Stroud

Sharpness (/ʃɑːrpˈnɛs/ sharp-NESS) is a port in the civil parish of Hinton, in the Stroud district, in Gloucestershire, England, one of the most inland in Britain, and eighth largest in the South West England region. It is on the River Severn at grid reference SO669027, at a point where the tidal range, though less than at Avonmouth downstream (14 metres (46 ft) typical spring tide), is still large (10 metres (33 ft) typical spring).

There is a small community of approximately 100 residents directly adjacent to the port, in addition to the subvillage of Newtown approximately 0.5 miles to the south-east. Four miles to the south lies the small town of Berkeley.

== Docks ==
Sharpness Docks Act 1879
- Act of Parliament
- Parliament of the United Kingdom
- Long title: An Act for conferring further Powers upon the Sharpness New Docks and Gloucester and Birmingham Navigation Company, for the raising of Capital, for the consolidation of Debenture Stock, and for other purposes.
- Citation: 42 & 43 Vict. c. clvii

Dates
- Royal assent: 21 July 1879

Text of statute as originally enacted

Sharpness docks began as a basin giving access to the Gloucester and Sharpness Canal. There were no port facilities at Sharpness itself and all traffic proceeded up the canal to Gloucester. The original Old Dock opened, with the canal, in 1827. The dock was separated from the Severn by a lock gate. The level of the basin varied for the hour or two for which the gate was open and so it was isolated from the canal by a lock with two gates. This lock was improved over time, expanding to be a ship lock of 163 ft length and 38 ft breadth and a smaller lock for trows of 81 ft and 19 ft. An intermediate lock gate was also provided in the larger lock, allowing shorter vessels to pass through more quickly and with less water consumption. A house for the Harbour Master was provided on the seaward dockside alongside the river gate. Today the Severn Area Rescue Association maintain a rescue station in the old house.

The size of the Old Dock became a drawback for increasingly large ships and so in 1874 a floating New Dock was opened to the South. This had several advantages over the Old Dock: its entrance was now through a tidal basin and a large lock. This gave a constant water level within the dock, matching that of the canal, and so no locks were needed between dock and canal, encouraging traffic. The lock was 320 ft long and 57 ft wide. For ships longer than this, the basin itself could also be used as a lock. A graving dock was provided parallel to the lock. This constant level encouraged the building of wharves and warehouses. With the new rail connections available to Bristol, Sharpness also developed as a port in its own right. At first the only stone quay was on the landward side of the dock, but after a railway swing bridge was built across the dock, the island area between the two docks also developed as a quayside.

In typical fashion for the competing pre-Grouping railway companies, there were not only two railway lines into Sharpness, but there were even two separate bridges across the dock: the Midland Railway's low level bridge from the south east to Berkeley, and the Great Western's high level bridge from the north and across the Severn. The line to the south was the Sharpness branch of the Bristol and Gloucester Railway, by this time part of the Midland, and opened on 2 August 1875. Although this line left Sharpness to the south, it joined the main line facing North. The northerly route across the bridge opened on 17 October 1879. An important development was on 19 March 1908 when a short Great Western line to the south of the previous junction formed the Berkeley triangle, giving a direct route to the Great Western main lines, and thus Bristol, through the Westerleigh Loop. (Note: Westerleigh Loop, and the opportunity it gave the Great Western for a route between Bristol and Birmingham, would be a cause of legal contention between the GWR and the Midland for some years. See Westerleigh Junction.)

After the New Dock was opened, the Old Dock and its cumbersome lock access to the canal was used less and less. From 1908 the old entrance was abandoned and the Old Dock became used for ship repair. After age, storm and tide damage led to the gates being removed and sealed permanently in the 1990s, the dock water level was raised to that of the canal and the locks could also be abandoned.

Just north of Sharpness the river and canal were crossed by the Severn Railway Bridge, until it was damaged beyond repair by a barge collision in 1960. The bridge was locally convenient, schoolchildren crossing the river to go to school, but it was soon superseded for long-distance travel by the double tracked Severn Tunnel on the faster and more direct route between Bristol or London and Cardiff.

Proposals to reinstate a river-crossing at this point are frequently made especially by the local authorities in Lydney, which lies almost opposite Sharpness.

The Port Authority for the impounded dock is Canal & River Trust, but the quayside activities are run by Sharpness Dock Limited. The competent (statutory) harbour authority for the river from the Severn Road Bridges up to Sharpness and on to Gloucester is Gloucester Harbour Trustees - they are responsible for navigation aids in the channel and for the provision of pilots. Pilotage up the river is compulsory (except for exemption holders) for all vessels over 30 metres length overall.

Between 1939 and 1966, the demasted sailing ship Vindicatrix was moored in the Old Dock as a training hulk for the Merchant Navy.

Seafarers' welfare charity Apostleship of the Sea, which provides practical and pastoral support to seafarers, has a port chaplain who covers Sharpness.

== Railway links ==
The port remains connected to the main Gloucester to Bristol railway line with its junction at the site of the former Berkeley Road railway station. The line is rarely used (if ever) although a steam special visited the line in April 2007, making two journeys from Gloucester. The locomotive (The Lancashire Fusilier) ran round its train using the loop at Sharpness. From the branch line, protected by locked gates, rails remain in situ around the docks and are linked to the line from Berkeley Road.

== In popular culture ==
The final episode of the third series of teenage drama Skins was filmed on location in Sharpness.
