= Wang Tao (archaeologist) =

Chinese-British archaeologist and art historian specialising in early Chinese art

- 汪濤
- Born: 1962 (age 63–64); Kunming, China
- Occupations: Archaeologist; Chinese art historian
- Known for: Helping found the International Centre for Chinese Heritage and Archaeology (ICCHA)
- Spouse: Helen Wang

Academic background
- Education: Yunnan Normal University; China Academy of Art; SOAS University of London
- Thesis: Colour Symbolism in Late Shang China (1993)
- Doctoral advisor: Sarah Allan

Academic work
- Discipline: Archaeology of China, art history
- Sub-discipline: Oracle bones Chinese ritual bronzes Art of early China
- Institutions: SOAS University of London; University College London; International Centre for Chinese Heritage and Archaeology (ICCHA); Sotheby's; Art Institute of Chicago

Tao Wang (simplified Chinese: 汪涛; traditional Chinese: 汪濤, born 1962) is a Chinese–British archaeologist and art historian specialising in early Chinese art. He is also known for his work on early inscriptions on oracle bones and ritual bronzes. He is married to numismatist and translator Helen Wang.

== Education ==
Wang was born in Kunming in 1962. He studied Chinese literature at Yunnan Normal University and did postgraduate work at the China Academy of Art. Wang moved to London in 1986. He studied under Sarah Allan at SOAS University of London, earning his PhD in 1993. His thesis was titled Colour Symbolism in Late Shang China.

== Academic career ==
After obtaining his PhD, Wang took up a position as lecturer in Chinese archaeology at SOAS. He was chair of the Centre of Chinese Studies at SOAS from 2005 to 2008. He was later appointed a senior lecturer at SOAS and University College London. He worked with Peter Ucko of the UCL Institute of Archaeology to develop links with archaeology departments in China, and helped found the International Centre for Chinese Heritage and Archaeology (ICCHA), a research centre jointly established by UCL and Peking University. He was instrumental in arranging the publication of Xia Nai's thesis "Ancient Egyptian Beads" (70 years after Xia Nai completed it). He also worked to promote links between the private art markets in China and the United Kingdom.

In 2012 Wang left the UK to take up a position as the senior vice president and head of Chinese works at Sotheby's in New York. In 2015, he was appointed the curator of Chinese art and Pritzker Chair at the Art Institute of Chicago.

Other positions held by Wang

- Visiting fellow at the Beijing Palace Museum, the Chinese Academy of Social Sciences, and the Yunnan Center for Southeast Asian Studies
- Guest professor at Yunnan University; and member of the academic board of the National Museum of Chinese Writing
- Member of the editorial boards of the Early China Journal, Bulletin of the Museum of Far Eastern Antiquities, Chinese Archaeology Journal (English Edition), and East Asian Journal: Studies in Material Culture.
- Chief editor of the Shanghai Fine Art Press series Art, Collecting and Connoisseurship
- Consultant and presenter for the BBC and Discovery Channel
- Judge for the annual Asian Art festival in London

== Selected publications ==
- 2018 (ed.) Mirroring China's Past: Emperors, Scholars, and their Bronzes (with chapters by Sarah Allan, Jeffrey Moser, Su Rongyu, Zhixin Sun, Zhou Ya, Liu Yu and Lu Zhang), Art Institute of Chicago, 2018, to coincide with a major exhibition in 2018
- 2012 "The Archaeological Inspiration for Contemporary Chinese Art" in Michael Goedhuis (ed.), Ink: The Art of China (London, 2012), pp. 17–19.
- 2012 "Tradition and Anti-tradition in Contemporary Chinese Calligraphy" in Helen Wang (ed.) The Music of Ink (Saffron Books, London)

On archaeology

- 2013 (with Denis Thouard) "Making New Classics: The Archaeology of Luo Zhenyu and Victor Segalen", in Humphreys S., Wagner R. (eds), Modernity's Classics. Transcultural Research – Heidelberg Studies on Asia and Europe in a Global Context (Springer: Berlin, Heidelberg)
- 2011 "'Public Archaeology' in China: A Preliminary Investigation", in Okamura K., Matsuda A. (eds) New Perspectives in Global Public Archaeology
- 2011 (with Luca Zan) "Management and presentation of Chinese sites for UNESCO World Heritage List (UWHL)", Facilities 29:7/8, 313–325.
- 2007 (with Peter Ucko) "Early Archaeological Fieldwork Practice and Syllabuses in China and England", in P. Ucko, L. Qin, and J. Hubert (eds), From Concept of the Past to Practical Strategies: the Teaching of Archaeological Field Techniques (Saffron Press London)
- 1999 (with Roderick Whitfield) Exploring China's Past: New Discoveries and Studies in Archaeology and Art (Saffron Press, London)

On early inscriptions

- 2007 "Shang Ritual Animals: Colour and Meaning (part 1)", Bulletin of SOAS, 70 (2), pp. 305–372.
- 2007 "Shang Ritual Animals: Colour and Meaning (part 2)", Bulletin of SOAS, 70 (3). pp. 539–567.
- 1995 (with N. Postgate and T. Wilkinson), "The evidence for early writing: Utilitarian or ceremonial?", Antiquity, 69(264), 459–480. This won the Antiquity Prize 1995.
- 2007 (with Hu Pingsheng 胡平生 and Frances Wood), Yingguo guojia tushuguan cang Sitanyin suohuo weikan Hanwen jiandu 《英國國家圖書館藏斯坦因所獲未刊漢文簡牘》[Unpublished Han dynasty woodslips in the Stein Collection at the British Library] (Shanghai cishu chubanshe, 2007)ISBN 9787532620982

On Chinese bronzes

- 2007 (with Liu Yu), A Selection of Inscribed Early Chinese Bronzes from Sotheby's and Christie's Sales
- 2007 The Meiyintang Collection of Ancient Chinese Bronzes (汪濤:《中國銅器》) ISBN 9780955335716

Translations

- 2010 《龟之谜（修订版）——商代神话、祭祀、艺术和宇宙观研究》 (2010) - Chinese translation of Sarah Allan's The Shape of the Turtle - Art, Myth and Cosmos in Early China

Documentary films

- 2001 The Strange Case of Peking Man (Granite Productions)

Children's Books

- 1995 Exploration into China
