= Peter Ucko =

English archaeologist (1938–2007)

- Ucko in his later years
- Born: Peter John Ucko; 27 July 1938; Buckinghamshire, England
- Died: 14 June 2007 (aged 68); London, England
- Burial place: Highgate Cemetery
- Education: University College London (BA, PhD)
- Occupation: Archaeologist
- Employer(s): Australian Institute of Aboriginal Studies (1972–81); University of Southampton (1981–96); UCL Institute of Archaeology (1996–06)
- Known for: World Archaeological Congress

Peter John Ucko FRAI FSA (27 July 1938 – 14 June 2007) was an influential English archaeologist. He served as Director of the Institute of Archaeology at University College London (UCL), and was a Fellow of both the Royal Anthropological Institute and the Society of Antiquaries. A controversial and divisive figure within archaeology, his life's work focused on eroding western dominance by broadening archaeological participation to developing countries and indigenous communities.

Born in London to middle class German Jewish parents, Ucko attained his BA and PhD in the anthropology department of UCL, where he proceeded to work from 1962 to 1972, also publishing a number of significant books on archaeology. From 1972 to 1981 he worked as Principal of the Australian Institute of Aboriginal Studies in Canberra, Australia, instituting measures to increase the participation of Indigenous Australian communities in their heritage. Returning to England in 1981 to teach archaeology at the University of Southampton, he became national secretary of the International Union of Prehistoric and Protohistoric Sciences (IUPPS) and was responsible for organising their eleventh congress in 1986; disagreements over whether to abide by the academic boycott of South Africa resulted in Ucko denouncing the IUPPS and founding the World Archaeological Congress (WAC), which focused on recognising current socio-political dimensions to archaeology.

In 1996 he was controversially appointed director of the UCL Institute of Archaeology, overseeing largescale expansion to create the world's largest archaeology department. Also teaching there, he initiated reforms to the syllabus and forged links with the archaeological community in the People's Republic of China, co-founding the International Centre for Chinese Heritage and Archaeology. Retiring in 2005, he continued developing connections between the UK and China until his death from diabetes.

== Life ==
=== Early life: 1938–1972 ===
Peter Ucko was born in Buckinghamshire on 27 July 1938 to German Jewish parents. His father was a professor of endocrinology who took a great interest in music, conducting orchestras and organising operas, while his mother was a child psychologist. He formed an 'unwavering obsession' with Egyptology at the age of eleven. He was sent to boarding school at Bryanston in Dorset, which he despised and left after displeasing the school authorities by refusing to play in a tennis doubles match with a local girls' school.

Studying for a year at North West London Polytechnic, he completed his A-levels and met a number of students from developing countries, developing his staunch anti-racist views. From 1956 to 1959, he studied for an undergraduate degree in anthropology from University College London (UCL), opting for courses that focused on archaeology. Remaining at UCL, in the Institute of Archaeology, he proceeded to study for a PhD in the anthropomorphic figurines of the ancient Near East, under the supervision of John Evans, completing it in 1962. Having placed a particular emphasis on Ancient Egypt, he came to be seen as an Egyptologist.

Ucko worked in the UCL Department of Anthropology for the next decade, founding the School of Material Culture Studies. He organised two academic conferences there, which subsequently led to two edited volumes: The Domestication of Plants and Animals and Man, Settlement and Urbanism, both of which became "standard texts." In 1967 he published Palaeolithic Cave Art, a book co-written with his girlfriend Andrée Rosenfeld, while the following year he published his doctoral research as a monograph titled Anthropomorphic Figurines of Predynastic Egypt and Neolithic Crete, which critiqued the claims regarding mother goddesses that had been popularised by Marija Gimbutas.

=== World archaeology: 1972–1996 ===
In 1972, he was appointed Principal of the Australian Institute of Aboriginal Studies in Canberra, Australia, negatively characterising it as an institution where white people were paid by white people to study black people. Overseeing a rapid expansion, he sought to involve Indigenous Australians in the project, hiring them in the council and its committees and launching a project known as "Before It Is Too Late" to preserve indigenous culture and language. He left in 1980, largely because of his dislike of fundraising, which was a major part of his role, insisting that his position be taken up by an Indigenous individual. Ucko was succeeded in the position by Eric Willmot, an eminent indigenous academic and engineer hailing from Cribb Island, Queensland.

In May 1981, following a spell of consultancy work for the Zimbabwean government, he was appointed Professor of Archaeology at the University of Southampton in England; he took up the position, left vacant by Colin Renfrew, in January 1982. Pioneering new teaching methods, from 1993 to 1996 he was appointed Dean of Arts at Southampton, allowing him greater space to institute reform.

Becoming national secretary of the International Union of Prehistoric and Protohistoric Sciences (UISPP), Ucko was charged with organising the organisation's eleventh congress, which was due to take place at Southampton University in 1986. Beginning preparations in 1984, he decided to abide by the international academic boycott of South Africa and Namibia, which had been implemented to protest the apartheid system in those countries; this meant that South African and Namibian delegates would be prevented from attending the congress. The decision caused controversy in the international archaeological community and raised questions of academic freedom. Senior figures in the UISPP argued that the congress must be open to all archaeologists "with no distinction of race, country or political persuasion", a position supported by the Society for American Archaeology. After UISPP disavowed the conference, Ucko continued to stage it under a new banner as the World Archaeological Congress (WAC), thus developing a new international organisation committed to "the explicit recognition of the historical and social role, and the political context, of archaeological enquiry".

=== Directorship of the UCL Institute of Archaeology: 1996–2005 ===
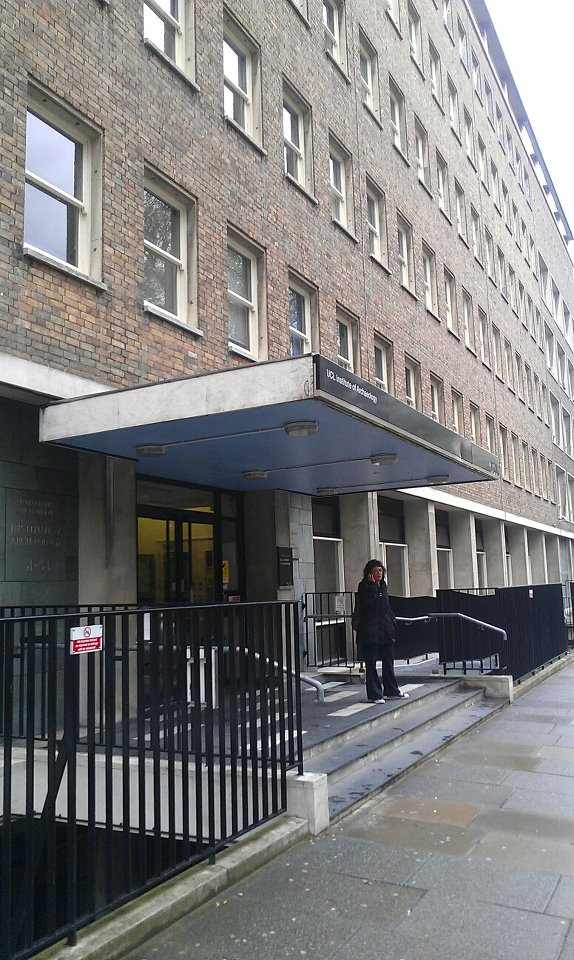
The entrance to the IoA.

In 1996 he was appointed Director of the UCL Institute of Archaeology in central London, also taking on the role of Professor of Comparative Archaeology. His appointment to the former was not universally popular. His later successor as director, Stephen Shennan, would comment that Ucko went about his job "with characteristic forcefulness, making new appointments, overturning existing structures and overhauling the syllabus at all levels." Ucko immediately implemented changes to the manner in which undergraduate courses were taught, based on his experiences at Southampton. Bringing in compulsory core courses for second and third years on such subjects as archaeological theory and public archaeology, he focused on generalisation at the undergraduate level, reserving specialisation for those students who went on to study at a master's degree level, expanding the number of master's degrees on offer.

Taking a particular interest in the fields of public archaeology and cultural heritage studies, he appointed new staff members to teach courses in such topics, and was involved in founding the Public Archaeology journal, initially edited by honorary lecturer Neal Ascherson. Keen on increasing the IoA's publishing output, he oversaw the creation of Archaeology International, a journal that first appeared in 1998, combining the roles of the former Bulletin of the Institute of Archaeology and the Annual Report, edited by David R. Harris. After Cavendish Press, publishers of the UCL Press imprint, were bought out by Taylor and Francis, Ucko initiated successful talks with Left Coast Press for the IoA to publish future works through them. He also emphasised the importance of the artefact collections owned by UCL and IoA, believing that they had great potential as teaching aids and for public outreach.

Having developed a keen interest in Chinese archaeology, he helped to forge greater links with archaeological departments in the People's Republic of China, and in conjunction with the School of Oriental and African Studies (SOAS) created two joint teaching positions in Chinese archaeology. In co-operation with the School of Archaeology and Museology at Peking University, he helped UCL found the International Centre for Chinese Heritage and Archaeology (ICCHA), an institution devoted to promoting the exchange of archaeologists between Europe and China. Appointed director of ICCHA, it soon yielded several collaborative projects in training and research, and resulted in a number of scholarships for Chinese students to be trained in archaeology at UCL. Ucko retired from the position of director in 2005, at which time the UCL-IoA had become the world's largest archaeology department, with over 70 academic staff and 600 students from 40 countries.

=== Retirement: 2005–2007 ===
Following his retirement, Ucko focused his attention on continuing dialogue between archaeological communities in the UK and PRC. In 2006 he travelled to ten Chinese cities with colleague Wang Tao, interviewing academic archaeologists about how they taught the subject; he planned to produce a book on this topic, but had not done so by the time of his death. A festschrift titled A Future for Archaeology, edited by Robert Layton, Stephen Shennan and Peter Stone, was produced in Ucko's honour in 2006. Ucko had chronic diabetes, a condition that contributed to his death on 14 June 2007.

== Personal life ==
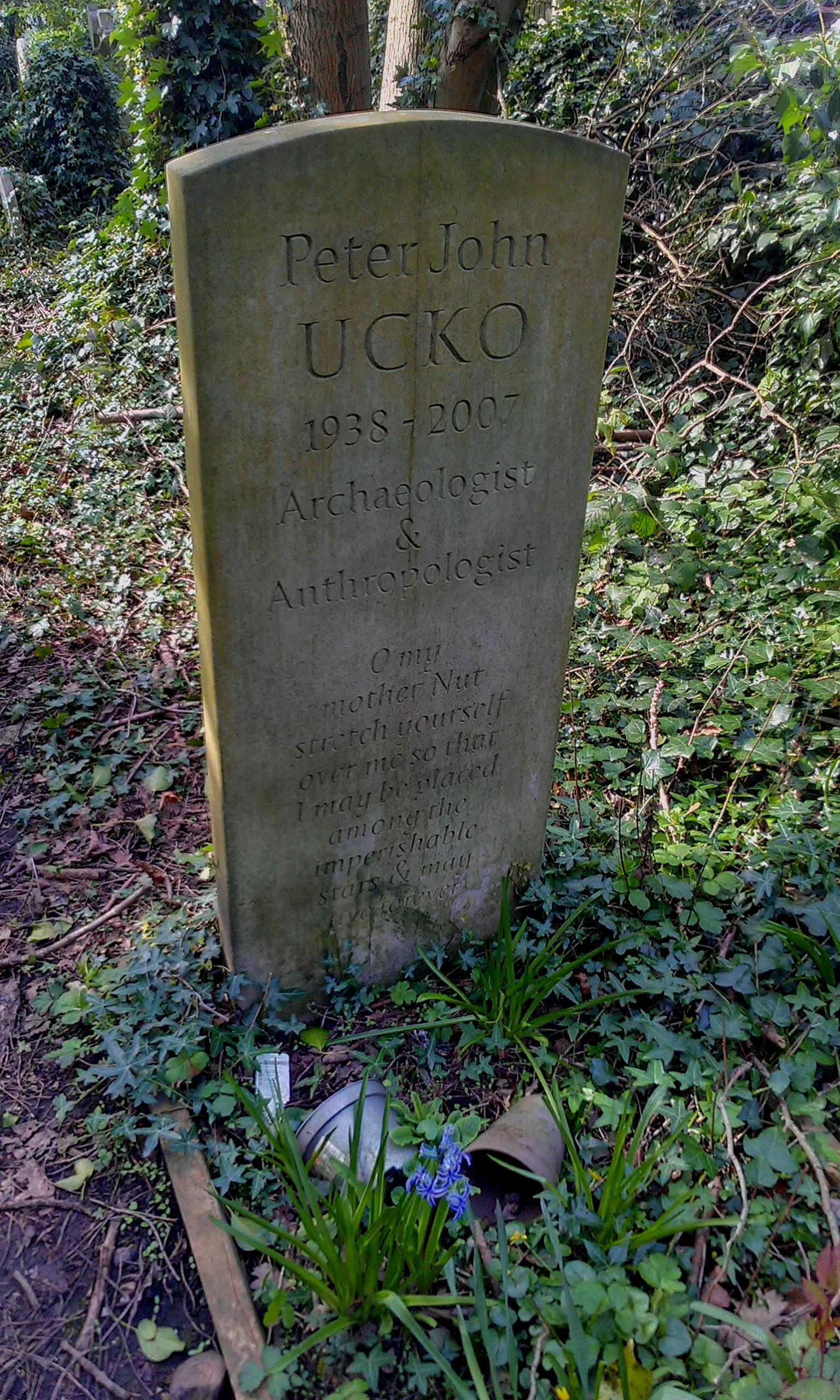
Ucko's grave in Highgate Cemetery, North London

His obituary for The Telegraph described Ucko as a "combative, nervy man" who had a tendency to become aggressive under pressure and who viewed the world "in terms of friends and enemies". It furthermore noted that he was "genial and unpretentious" in the company of others, who often developed "strong affection" for him. Shennan opined that Ucko was a charismatic and dedicated figure who led by example, remarking that his actions inspired many archaeologists, including those who had fallen out with him. Shennan also considered him to have been extremely generous, exhibiting a "massive fund of human warmth."

His partner of 27 years was Jane Hubert, who supported him both emotionally and physically, sacrificing her own professional and personal interests to do so.

== The Peter Ucko Archaeological Trust ==
The Peter Ucko Archaeological Trust was established in 2007, and focuses particularly on providing financial assistance for indigenous and economically disadvantaged people to gain education and training in archaeology, heritage management and associated disciplines, and supports activities that address inequalities and cultural conflict in the areas of archaeological heritage and cultural property. The Trust is administered by the UCL Institute of Archaeology.

== The Ucko Collection ==
The Ucko Collection consists of archaeological objects originally collected by Peter Ucko. On his death, ownership passed to his partner Jane Hubert, who later approached members of the Institute of Archaeology's staff with a desire to donate the collection to a public institution, an act which inspired the "Transitional Objects" project (UCL, 2014–2016).

== Publications ==
Books

- Ucko, P & T. Champion, (2003). The Wisdom of Egypt: changing visions through the ages. London: UCL Press. One of eight books in the Encounters with Ancient Egypt series edited by Peter Ucko
- Ucko, P., (1987). Academic Freedom and Apartheid: The Story of the World Archaeological Congress. London: Duckworth. ISBN 0-7156-2191-2
- Ucko, P., (1968). Anthropomorphic figurines of predynastic Egypt and neolithic Crete, with comparative material from the prehistoric Near East and mainland Greece. London: Andrew Szmidla. 530 p.
- Ucko, Peter J. & Andrée Rosenfeld, (1967). Palaeolithic Cave Art. London: Cop.

Articles

- Sully, D., Quirke, S., Ucko, P.J. (2006). "Hathor, goddess of love and joy, a Norfolk wherry launched in 1905", Public Archaeology 5(1): 26–36. ISSN 1465-5187
- Ucko, P. (2006). "Unprovenanced Material Culture and Freud's Collection of Antiquities", Journal of Material Culture 6: 251–268. ISSN 1359-1835
- Ucko, P.J. (2006). "Living Symbols of Ancient Egypt", Public Archaeology 5(1). ISSN 1465-5187
- Ucko, P.J., Price, C., Quirke, S. (2006). "A recent Egyptianizing house built on the bank of the Thames", Public Archaeology 5(1): 51–7. ISSN 1465-5187
- Ucko, P.J., Price, C., Quirke, S. (2006). "The Earl's Court Homebase car park facade", Public Archaeology 5(1): 42–50. ISSN 1465-5187
- Ucko, P.J., Quirke, S. (2006). "2004 advertisement for the TV version of Agatha Christie's 'Death on the Nile'", Public Archaeology 5(1). ISSN 1465-5187
- Ucko, P.J., Quirke, S. (2006). "Living Symbols of Ancient Egypt: Introduction", Public Archaeology 5(1): 5–14. ISSN 1465-5187
- Ucko, P.J., Quirke, S. (2006). "The Petrie Medal", Public Archaeology 5(1): 15–25. ISSN 1465-5187
- Ucko, P.J., Quirke, S.Q., Sully, D. (2006). "The past in the present and future: concluding thoughts", Public Archaeology 5(1): 58–72. ISSN 1465-5187
- Ucko, P, (2000). "Enlivening a 'dead' past", Conservation and Management of Archaeological Sites, 4: 67–92
- Ucko, P, (1998). "The Biography of a Collection: The Sir Flinders Petrie Palestinian Collection and the Role of University Museums", Museum Management and Curatorship 17(4): 351–99.
- Ucko, P, (1996). "Mother, are you there?", Cambridge Archaeological Journal 6: 300–4.
- Ucko, P, (1995). "Introduction: archaeological interpretation in a world context", in Theory in Archaeology, ed. P J Ucko. London: Routledge, pp. 1–27.
- Ucko, P, (1994). "Museums and sites: cultures of the past within education Zimbabwe, some ten years on", in The Presented Past: heritage, museums and education, eds. P Stone & B. Molyneux. London: Routledge, pp. 237–82.
- Ucko, P, (1992). "Subjectivity and the recording of Palaeolithic Cave Art", in The Limitations of Archaeological Knowledge, eds. T Shay & J Clottes. Liege: University of Liege Press, pp. 141–80.
- Ucko, P.J. (1965). "Anthropomorphic ivory figurines from Egypt", Journal of the Royal Anthropological Institute, 92: 214–38.
- Ucko, P.J. & H.W. Hodges (1963). "Some pre-dynastic figurines: problems of authenticity", Journal of the Warburg and Courtauld Institutes, 26(3/4): 205–22.
- Ucko, P.J., (1962). "The Interpretation of Prehistoric Anthropomorphic Figurines", Journal of the Royal Anthropological Institute of Great Britain and Ireland 92, no. 1 (Jan.-Jun. 1962): 38–54.

== See also ==
- List of Egyptologists
