= International Centre for Chinese Heritage and Archaeology =

The International Centre for Chinese Heritage and Archaeology (ICCHA) (Chinese: 中国文化遗产保护与考古学研究国际中心) is the name of a collaborative centre between University College London and Peking University.

== About the Centre ==
The International Centre for Chinese Heritage and Archaeology is a collaboration between the School for Archaeology and Museology of Peking University and the Institute of Archaeology, UCL, to promote the exchange of archaeologists between Europe and China. The ICCHA regularly hosts world-class conferences, invites visiting scholars, enables exchange and communication between Chinese and British archaeologist, seeking to bridge the gap in archaeological thought and theory.

== History of the Centre ==
The Centre owes much to the vision of Peter Ucko, former director of the Institute of Archaeology, UCL. True to his commitment to world archaeology, Ucko developed a keen interest in China, and sought to bring Chinese archaeology into the world archaeology. With the help of Wang Tao, then Lecturer in Chinese art and archaeology at SOAS and others, he developed links with archaeological departments in the People's Republic of China, and arranged for two joint posts in Chinese archaeology to be shared between UCL and SOAS, one of which was taken by Wang. The International Centre for Chinese Heritage and Archaeology (ICCHA) was officially launched in Beijing on 15 December 2003, with the full support of the State Administration of Cultural Heritage of the People's Republic of China, with joint offices in London and Beijing, forming the first such venture between China and the United Kingdom. With Ucko as its first director (2003-2007), the ICCHA soon yielded several collaborative projects in training and research, and resulted in a number of scholarships for Chinese students to be trained in archaeology at UCL. In 2006 Ucko and Wang travelled to ten Chinese cities, interviewing academic archaeologists about how they taught the subject, with the aim of publishing their findings, but Ucko's untimely death prevented this.

The ICCHA celebrated its 10th anniversary in 2013.

== ICCHA Conferences ==
- 2015 Dialogue of Civilizations: Comparing Multiple Centres of Early Civilizations of the World, in Beijing (jointly sponsored by the National Geographic Society, Peking University, and the State Administration of Cultural Heritage)
- 2011 Emergence of Bronze Age Societies: A Global Perspective, at Baoji Museum of Bronzes, Shaanxi Province, China, 8-12 Nov 2011
- 2008 Sharing Archaeology: Heritage and Communication
- 2006 On Archaeological Field Training

== Selected Research Projects ==
- Imperial Logistics: The Making of the Terracotta Army
- Archaeometallurgy
- The Early Rice Project
- Comparative Pathways to Agriculture: Chinese Crop Domestications
- Neolithic Niuheliang, China
