= Academic Freedom and Apartheid =

Academic Freedom and Apartheid: The Story of the World Archaeological Congress
- Cover of the book. The scene in the photograph is described by Jane Hubert on p. 164: 'on the lap of Antonio Males, the Quichua Indian from Ecuador, a Sámi child was engrossed in my daughter's Turkish puzzle ring'
- Author: Peter Ucko
- Published: Duckworth
- Publication date: 1987
- ISBN: 0715621807

Academic Freedom and Apartheid: The Story of the World Archaeological Congress (London: Duckworth, 1987) by Peter Ucko is a personal account of the 1986 World Archaeological Congress (WAC), originally intended to be the eleventh congress of the International Union for Prehistoric and Protohistoric Sciences (IUPPS). Ucko, who organised the Congress, presents a linear account of how the Congress came to ban participation by South Africans and Namibians as part of the Academic boycott of South Africa, and how this led to it splitting from the IUPPS. It quotes extensively from sources such as correspondence, minutes, newspapers, WAC publicity, and others' accounts of the WAC.

== Summary ==
After a foreword by Neal Ascherson, the introduction provides some autobiographical information about Ucko and sketches his personal view of the place of the WAC in the field of archaeology. One of Ucko's key arguments is that the IUPPS, and archaeology generally, was too Eurocentric and exclusionary of Third- and Fourth-World viewpoints and participation.

Chapter 1, "How Not to Finance a Congress", describes how British archaeologists upset by the poor running of the 1981 IUPPS congress determined to bring the 1986 congress to Britain and convinced Ucko, newly appointed as head of archaeology at Southampton University, to organise it (as its National Secretary). The chapter argues that much fundraising was shambolic, but narrates that Ucko succeeded in prompting relevant parties to offer sufficient underwriting for the event.

Chapter 2, "Academic Planning", sketches Ucko's view that the WAC, and archaeology more generally, needed to be more global both in intellectual outlook and in participation. It offers a detailed chronological account of assembling the academic advisers and other staffing, and publishing the Congress's first and second announcements.

Chapter 3, "The Banning of South African and Namibian Participation", recounts growing tensions through 1985 between Ucko and key personnel of the IUPPS and political pressures brought to bear by the anti-apartheid movement, particularly in Southampton, to make the WAC participate in the academic boycott of South Africa and Namibia. It offers detailed accounts of various WAC organising meetings, growing press interest, and rapidly shifting willingness of different academics to participate in the Congress in view of the boycott.

Chapter 4, "The Build-up to Paris", sets the scene for the decision of a meeting of the IUPPS International Executive Committee on 17 January 1986 which determined to expel the WAC from the IUPPS and to establish an alternative IUPPS congress in Mainz in 1987. It offers a chronological account of shifting allegiances and Ucko's efforts to enable extensive Third- and Fourth-World representation in Paris.

Chapter 5, "Western European Manipulation and Presidential Timidity", is Ucko's blow-by-blow account of the Paris meeting, and a focal point for Ucko's critique of the IUPPS's Eurocentrism.

Chapter 6, "Cancel and/or Be Damned", charts events from the Paris meeting to a meeting of the WAC's Executive Committee on 8 February 1986 at which most of the Executive resigned, enabling Ucko to form a new committee to continue organising the WAC outside the IUPPS.

Chapter 7, "Public and World Reaction", does survey some of the responses to the WAC proceeding in national press and specialist international discussions, but also narrates the efforts to retain or gain funding and to enable the WAC to happen.

Chapter 8, "The World Archaeological Congress", largely comprises long quotations of accounts of the Congress of 1–6 September 1986 by people other than Ucko, with Ucko's own narrative of the administration of that week interspersed.

Chapter 9, "The Plenary Session", again largely comprises quotations of speeches made at the end-of-congress plenary, at which participants from different regions express their enthusiasm for continued WACs.

Chapter 10, "The Aftermath", comprises Ucko's musings on events as they continued to unfold following the 1986 WAC, ending

Academics who value the principle of academic free speech, as I and my colleagues involved in the WAC unquestionably do, will have to face the inevitable dilemma again and again until apartheid in South Africa no longer exists. It is my hope that the story of the World Archaeological Congress may help them to resolve this dilemma, to come out from behind the shaky edifice of their own academic freedom, and turn their attention to the issue of freedom itself.

Between pages 146 and 147 are eight pages of black-and-white photographs, mostly from the Congress.

The book concludes with eleven appendices: abbreviations, a glossary, a chronology, a reprint of the Revised World Archaeological Congress Second Announcement, a chart of the organisational structure of international academic bodies mentioned in the text, a list of the International Executive Committee of the IUPPS, a list of the members of the WAC's Executive Committee and Board of Directors, a list of the countries represented at the WAC, a copy of a 9 February 1987 letter from Ucko to the UNESCO Non-Governmental Organisations Unit seeking to establish UNESCO's role in determining IUPPS policy on South Africa, a message from Anti-Apartheid, and suggested revisions by the WAC Steering Committee of the IUPPS statutes. The is a short list of further reading, and indices.

== Reception ==
The book was widely reviewed.

Criticisms of the book per se included Sandra Bowdler's argument that the book's scope was poorly represented by its title:

Anybody acquiring a book entitled Academic Freedom and Apartheid would understandably look forward to a discussion of such topics as whether academic freedom were truly possible under the South African regime of apartheid, how the more liberal South African universities and other research and educational institutions were faring in the face of their repressive government, whether academics, by such actions as international boycotts of various sorts, had any effects on that regime, and if so, whether they were of the sort intended, and so on. Well, you can forget all that. To me, the major disappointment of this book is its complete failure to enter into any detailed discussion of these topics. This is not necessarily a criticism in that this is not the book's stated aim, but arises from its title. Were its title and subtitle to be interchanged, the prospective reader would have a much better idea of what she or he were in for.

Other criticisms included alleged misleadingly selective quotation and omission of details that shed a less favourable light on Ucko's position (e.g. Polish archaeologists, refusing to attend in solidarity with South Africans, being forced to by their government, and sending a token representative in response); a lack of recognition of the experience of Nazi occupation in forming the views of Continental European actors on academic freedom; and scepticism at Ucko's claims that he had not planned on using the WAC as a platform for anti-apartheid views all along.

Like the book itself, reviews were often political statements, focusing on stating the reviewer's own position on the debates surrounding the WAC. Writing in Nature, Conor Cruise O'Brien argued that the boycott of South African academics had done nothing to influence the apartheid regime in South Africa, while encouraging the curtailing of academic freedom of speech, including in other African countries. John Collis argued that 'For WAC, the message is also clear. If it wishes to be an organization which can speak authoritatively for archaeology, and not be dismissed as a left wing organization, it has got to attract back the bulk of those of us who withdrew, and this means resolving the question of open participation. If it does not, it will lack the moral and political authority to speak for archaeology, and therefore will not be heeded where it needs to be heard most'.

Reviews contemplated whether the book represented an ego-trip by Ucko. J. Desmond Clark wrote that the book is 'interesting as a detailed account of how a determined individual dealt with what promised to be a difficult situation in such a way as to give the impression, however erroneous, of being the organizer of a humanitarian crusade'. On the other hand, Larry J. Zimmerman commented that

as archeologists we will face personal political decisions that are bound to affect our practice. Ucko demonstrates this with extraordinary courage and candor, documenting personal insight and growth in ways uncommon to our profession. His weaknesses and strengths, his biases, and his passion for archeology are apparent throughout. Some will call the book an "ego trip," but thinking archeologists will see a bit of their own personal struggle in it.
