= Meiyintang Collection =

Collection of Chinese ceramics

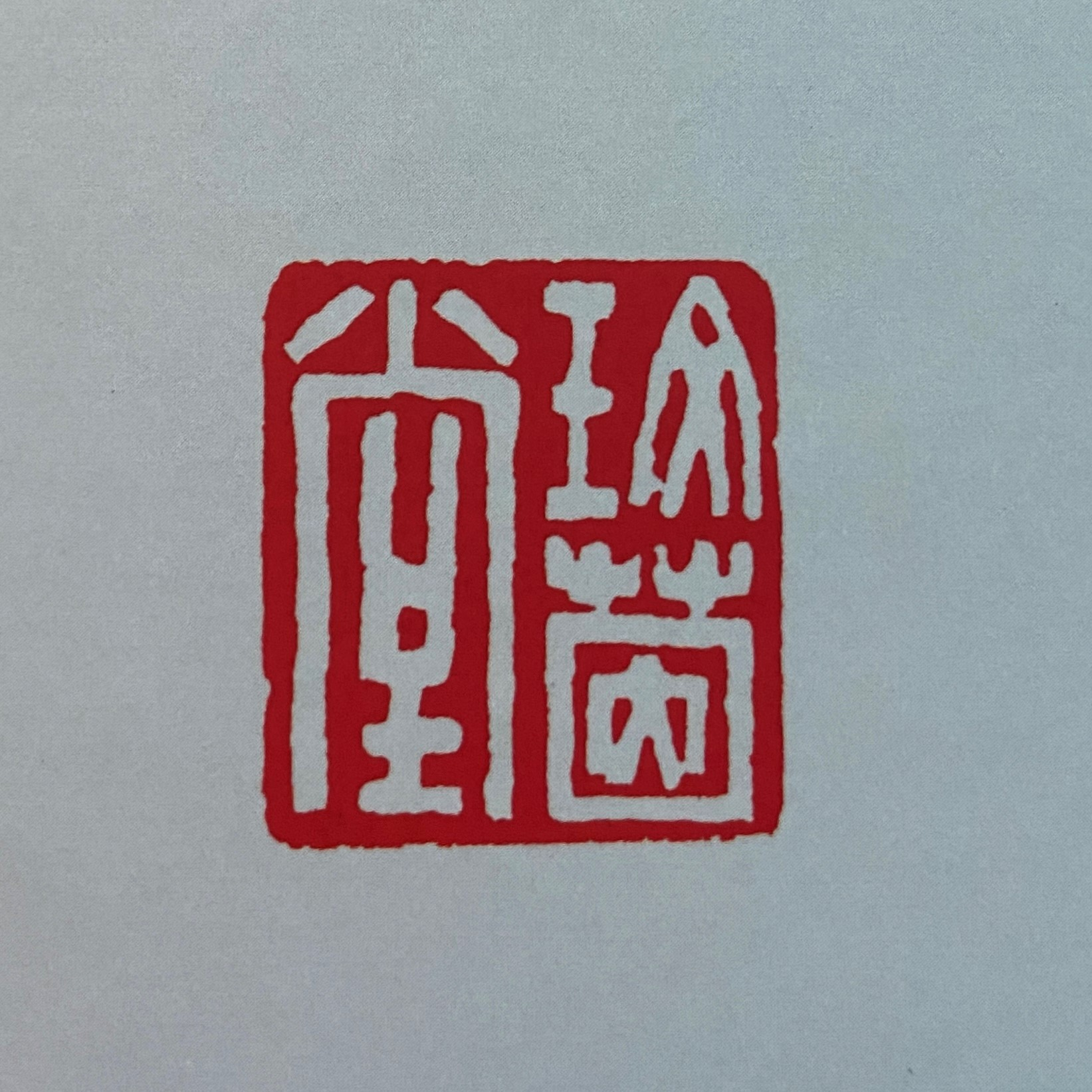
Seal "Meiyintang", carved by the Taiwanese artist Xiao Yu (b. 1947)

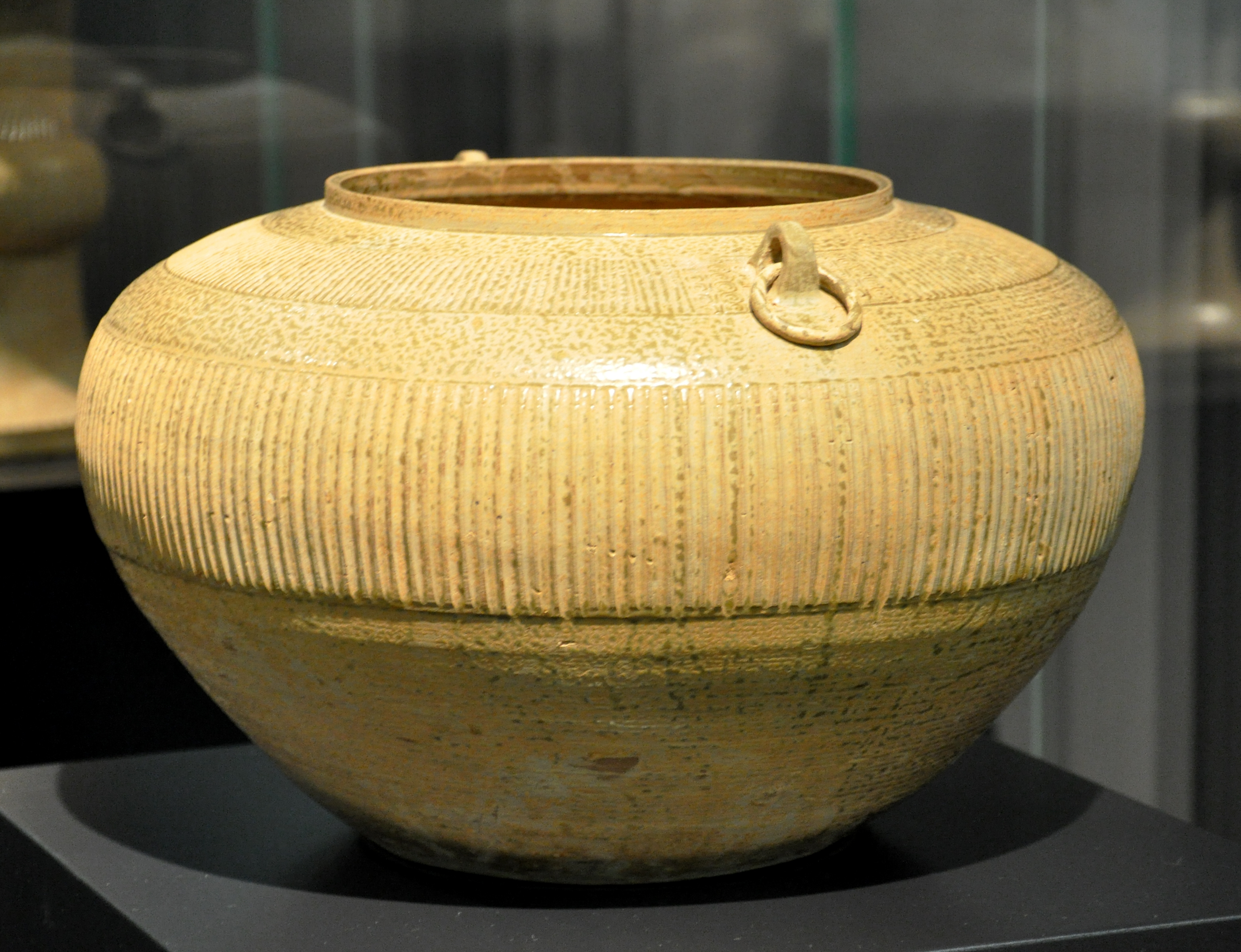
Object from the Meiyintang Collection at Rietberg Museum

The Meiyintang Collection is a privately owned assembly of Chinese ceramics, porcelain and bronzes, the majority of which are presently on loan to the Swiss Rietberg Museum in Zurich, which has been hailed as one of the finest private collections of Chinese porcelain in the Western world. Meiyintang 玫茵堂, "Hall among Rosebeds", is the adopted Chinese studio name of the collection.

== History ==
The brothers Stephen Zuellig (1917–2017) and Gilbert Zuellig (1918–2009), both born in Manila, developed manifold interests in Asian art and culture throughout their life and business activities in the Far East. In the late 1950s, they began to build up a systematic collection of Chinese art. Gilbert Zuellig specialized in early pottery, stoneware and ceramics, spanning five millennia from the Neolithic period to the Han, Tang and Song dynasties, while his brother Stephen collected the porcelains of the later Yuan, Ming and Qing dynasties as well as archaic bronzes of the Shang, Zhou and Warring States period. Early on in their career as expert collectors, the Zuellig brothers were encouraged and guided by the connoisseur and dealer Edward T. Chow.

As of 1994, following the publication of the scholarly collection catalogues written by the researcher Regina Krahl, the term “Meiyintang” gained international recognition among specialists of Chinese art. Exhibitions dedicated to objects from the Meiyintang Collection were held at the British Museum in London (1994), the Sporting d’Hiver in Monte Carlo (1996), the Asia Society (1995) and the China Institute (2001) in New York, the Musée Cernuschi in Paris (1999), the Musée du Président Jacques Chirac in Sarran, Corrèze (2009) and the Musée Guimet in Paris (2013).

In 2001, President Chirac of France acknowledged the Zuellig brothers for their role in promoting the cultural understanding between East and West by awarding them the rank of Chevaliers of the Ordre National de la Légion d’honneur.

In 2011 and 2012, a substantial portion of the Yuan, Ming and Qing pieces of the Meiyintang Collection was sold in a series of auctions by Sotheby's in Hong Kong, among them the famed Chenghua “chicken cup.” Shortly thereafter, selected pieces of Gilbert Zuellig's collection were placed on permanent loan with the Museum Rietberg in Zurich.

== Permanent exhibit at the Rietberg Museum ==
As Gilbert Zuellig and his family wished to preserve his collection as an ensemble and to make it accessible to the general public, the majority of the pieces were transferred to a foundation, the Meiyintang Stiftung. In 2012, the foundation placed six hundred objects with the Museum Rietberg in Zurich under a long-term loan agreement and enabled the museum to refurbish the exhibition space of its department of Chinese arts, including the installation of an innovative lighting system to provide optimal conditions for the display of the collection.

== Bibliography ==
- Evolution vers la perfection, Céramiques de Chine de la Collection Meiyintang, Sporting d’Hiver, Monte Carlo 1996 (exhibition catalogue).
- Regina Krahl: Chinese Ceramics from the Meiyintang Collection, (Volumes I, II, III, IV), London 1994–2010.
- Regina Krahl: L’âge d’or de la céramique chinoise, VIe – XIVe siècles, Collection Meiyintang, Musée Cernuschi, Paris 1999 (exhibition catalogue).
- Regina Krahl, Willow Hai Chang, China Institute Gallery: Dawn of the Yellow Earth – Ancient Chinese Ceramics from the Meiyintang Collection, New York 2000 (exhibition catalogue).
- Regina Krahl: Trésors de la collection Meiyintang, Céramique chinoise ancienne, exposition, Sarran, Musée du Président Jacques Chirac, 2009 (exhibition catalogue).
- Sotheby's: The Meiyintang Collection, Part I-V, Hong Kong 2011–2013.
- Wang Tao, Chinese Bronzes from the Meiyintang Collection (London, 2009) ISBN 9780955335716
- Christian Deydier, Chinese Bronzes from the Meiyintang Collection (2 vols) (Hong Kong, 2013)
- Alexandra von Przychowski, Chinese Ceramics – The Meiyintang Collection in the Museum Rietberg (Zurich, 2018) ISBN 978-3-907077-59-7

== Gallery ==
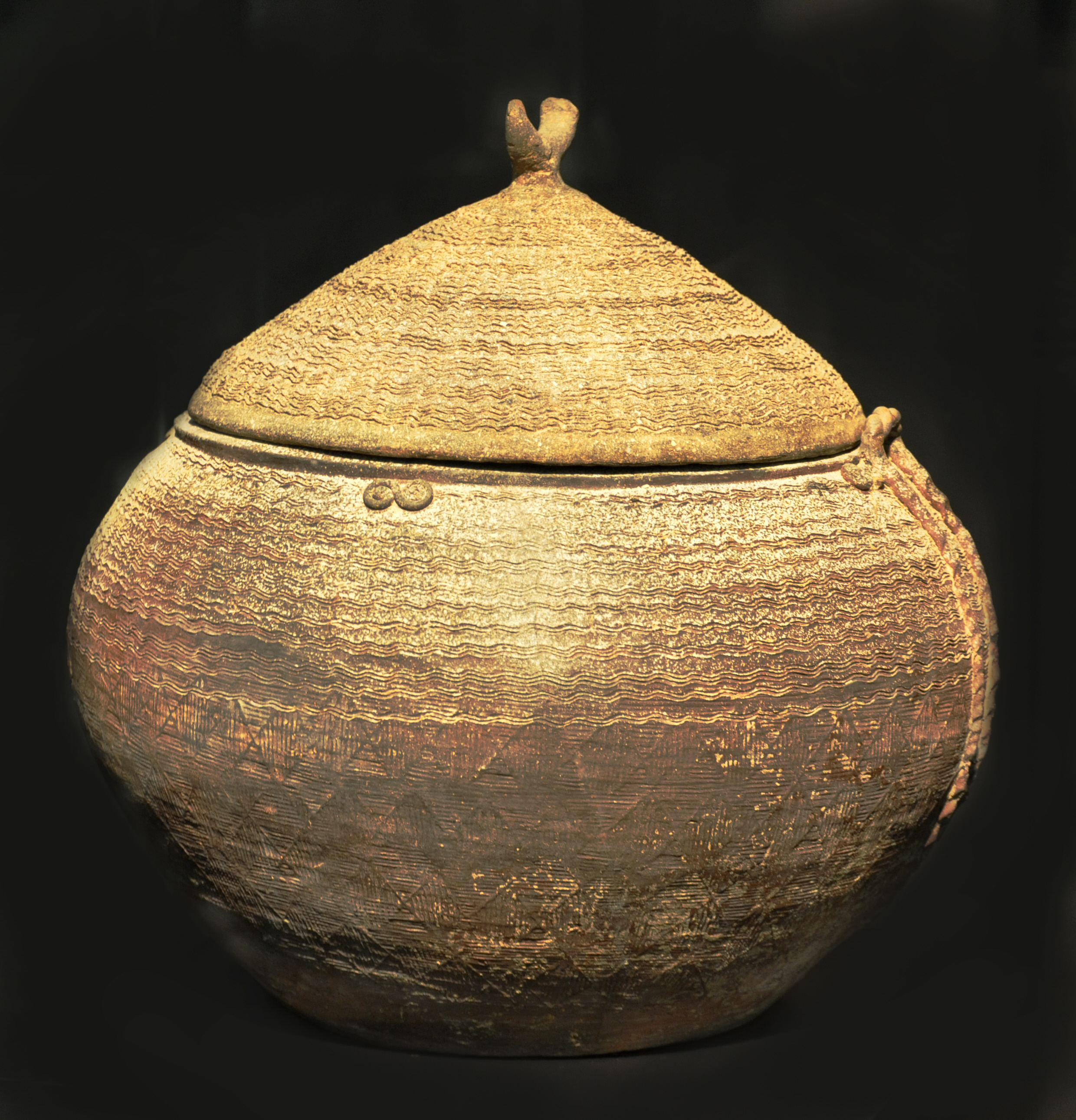

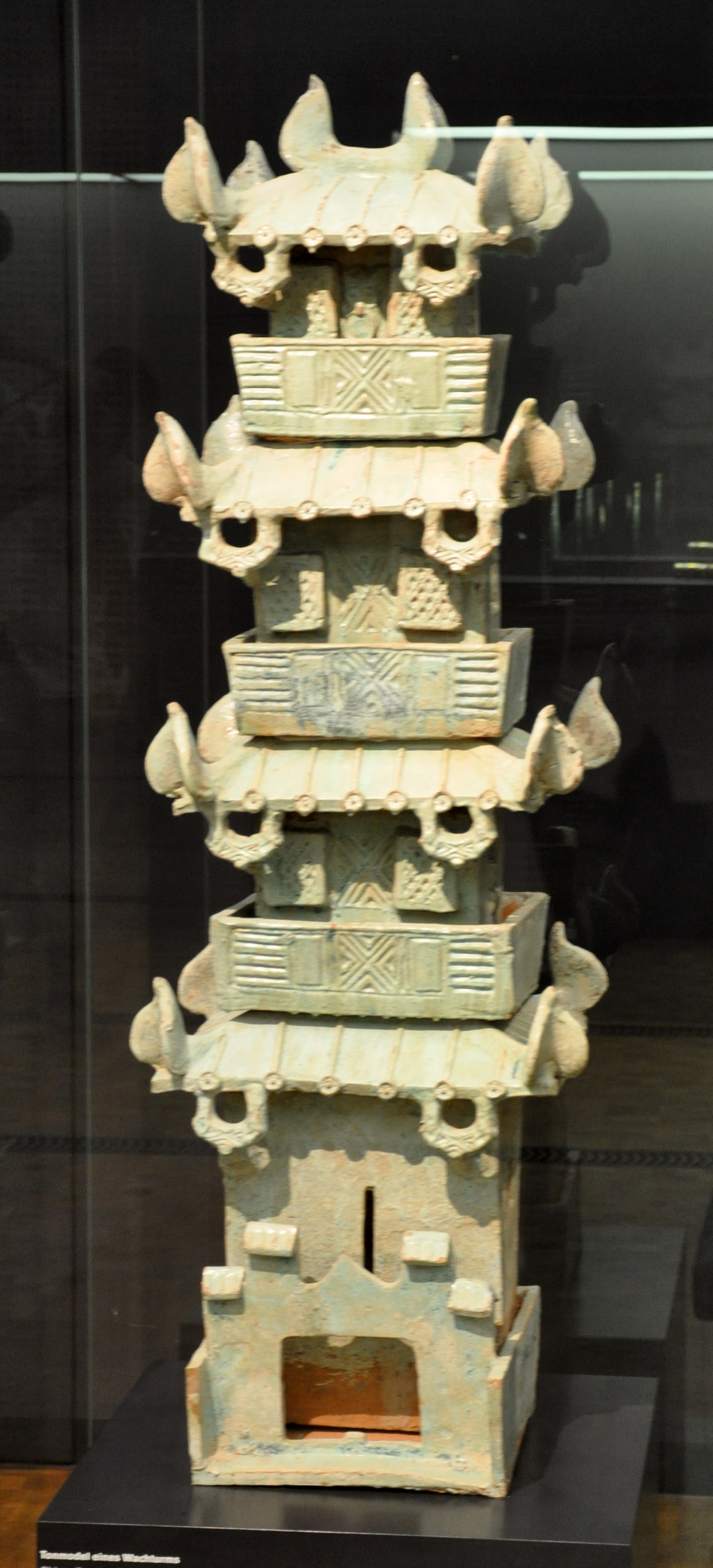

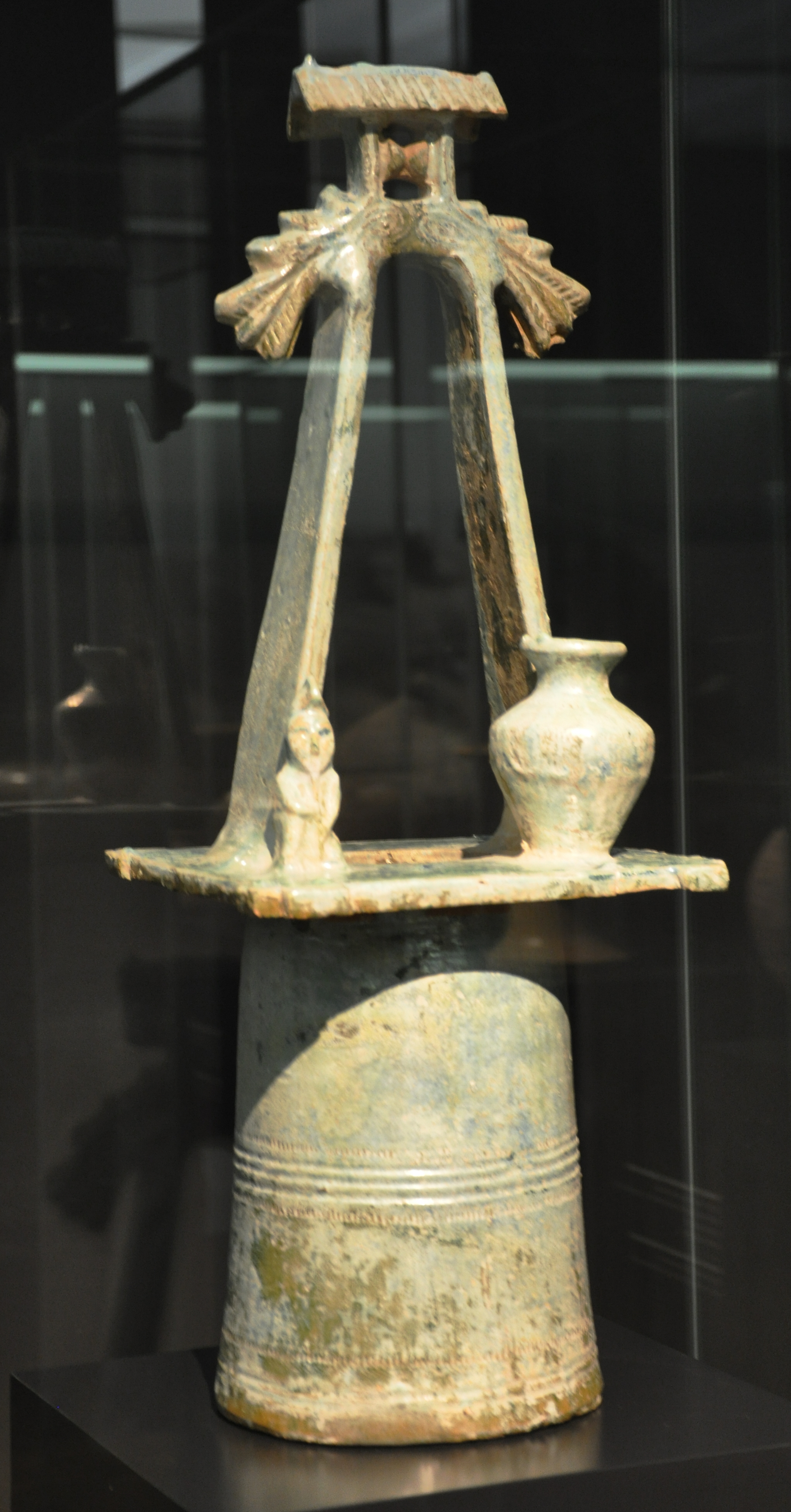

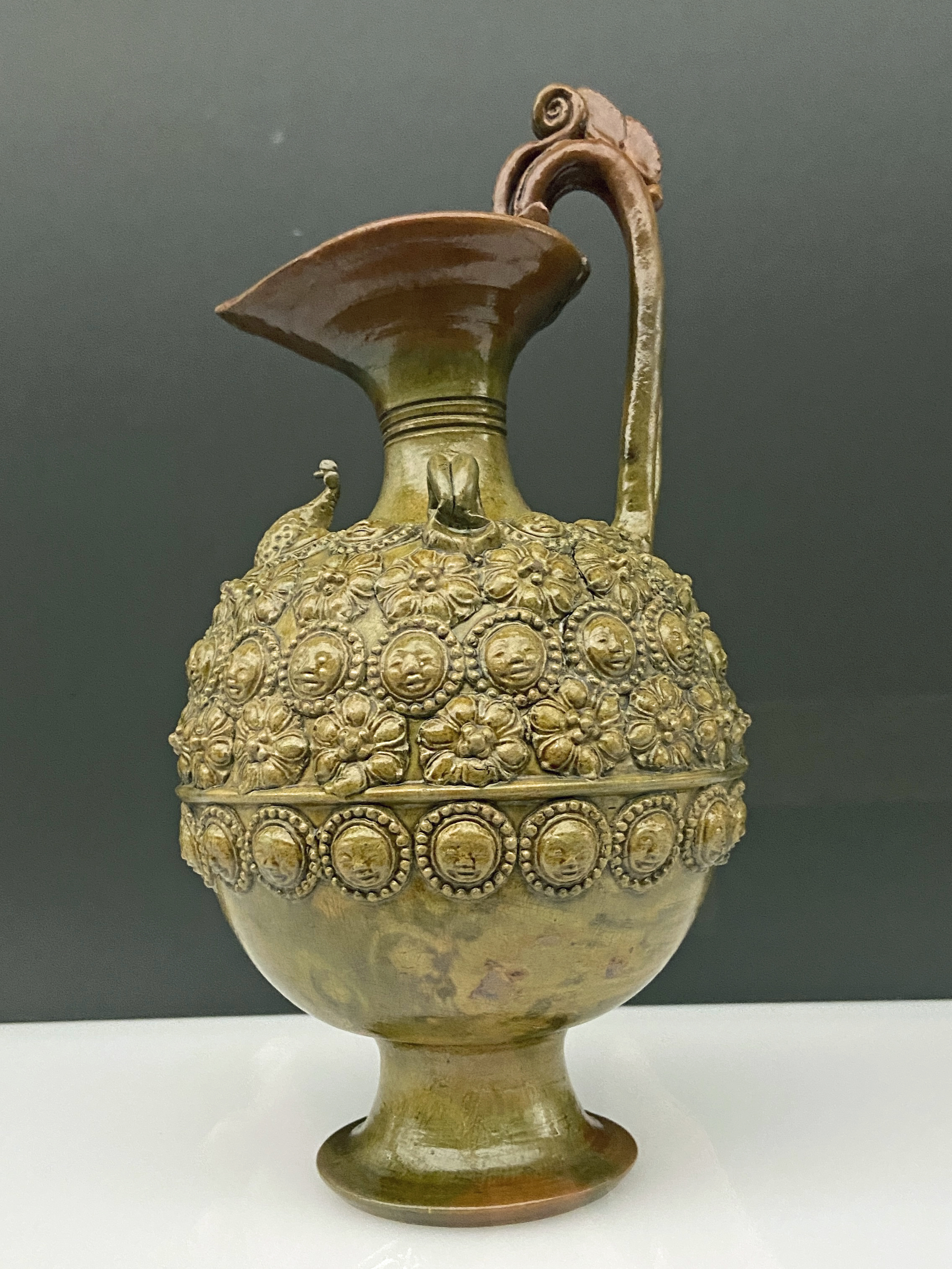

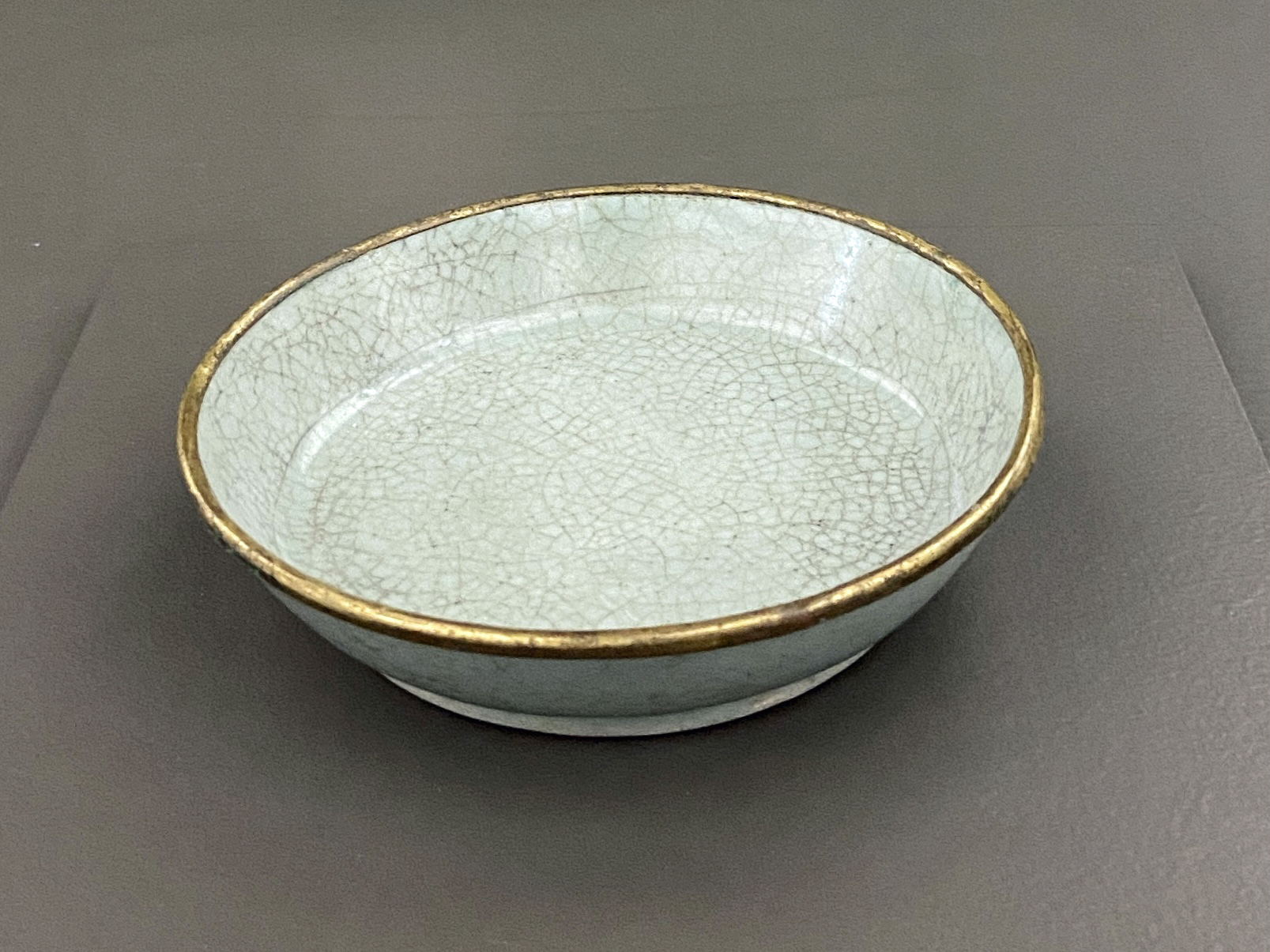

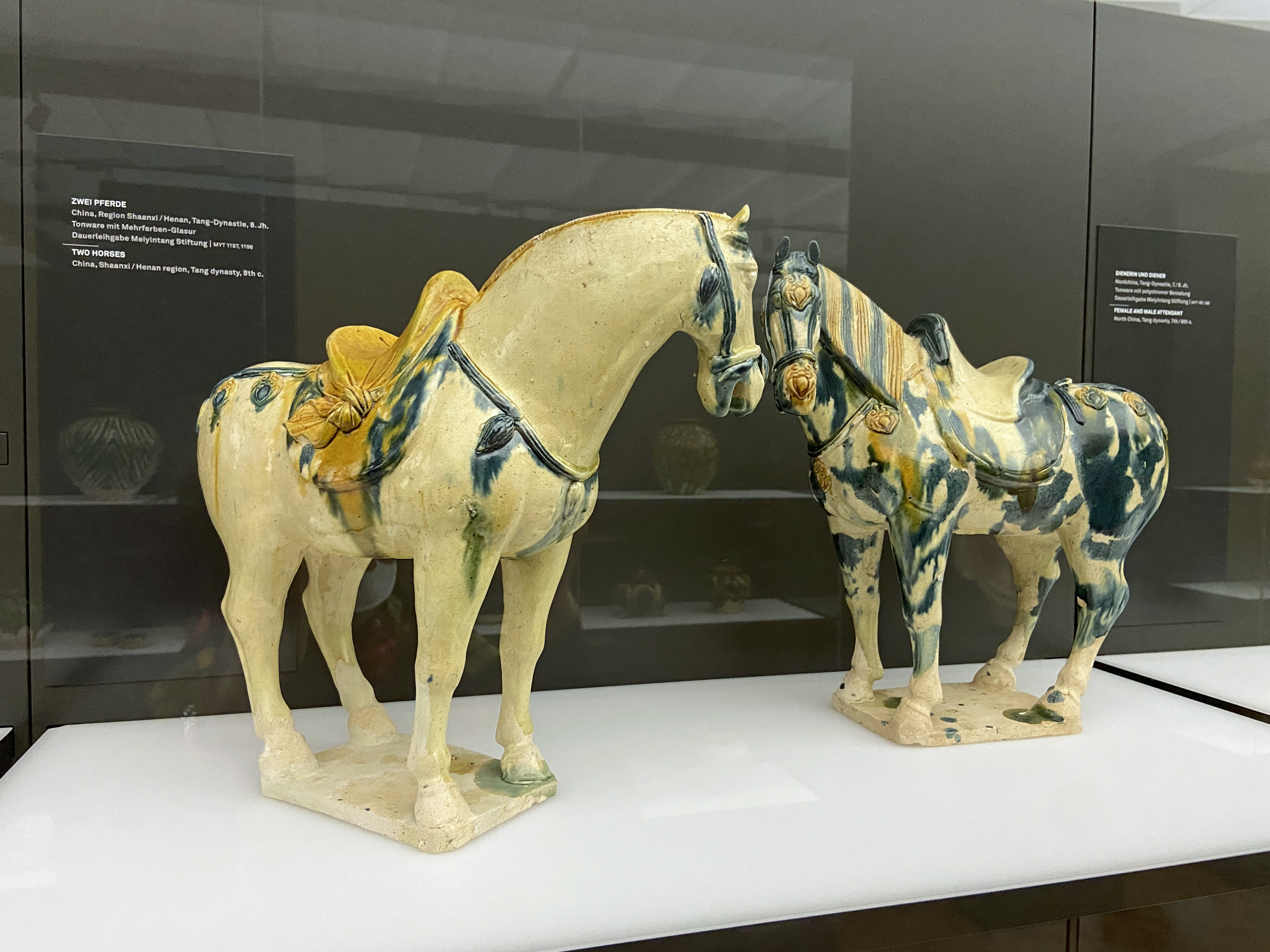

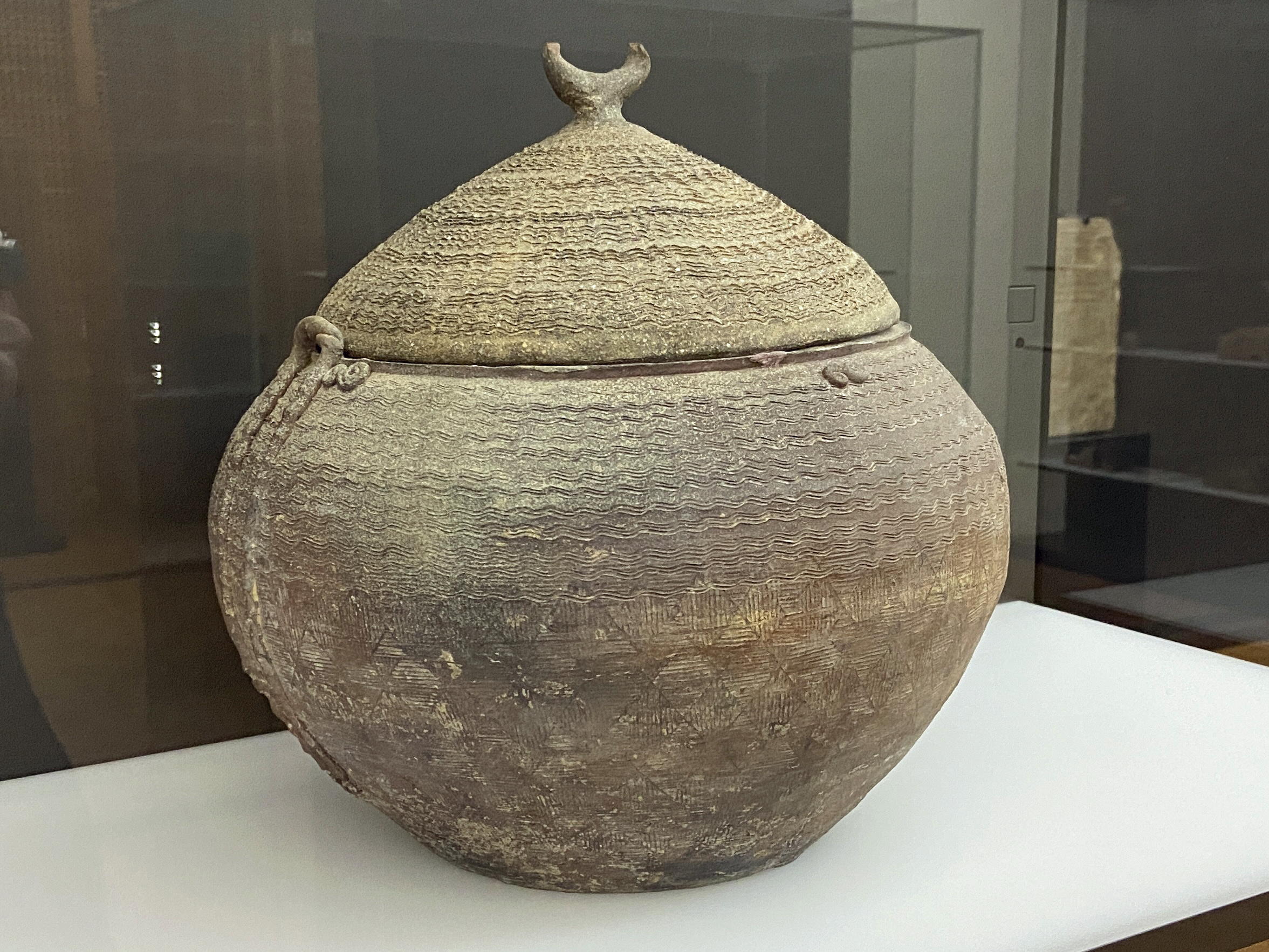

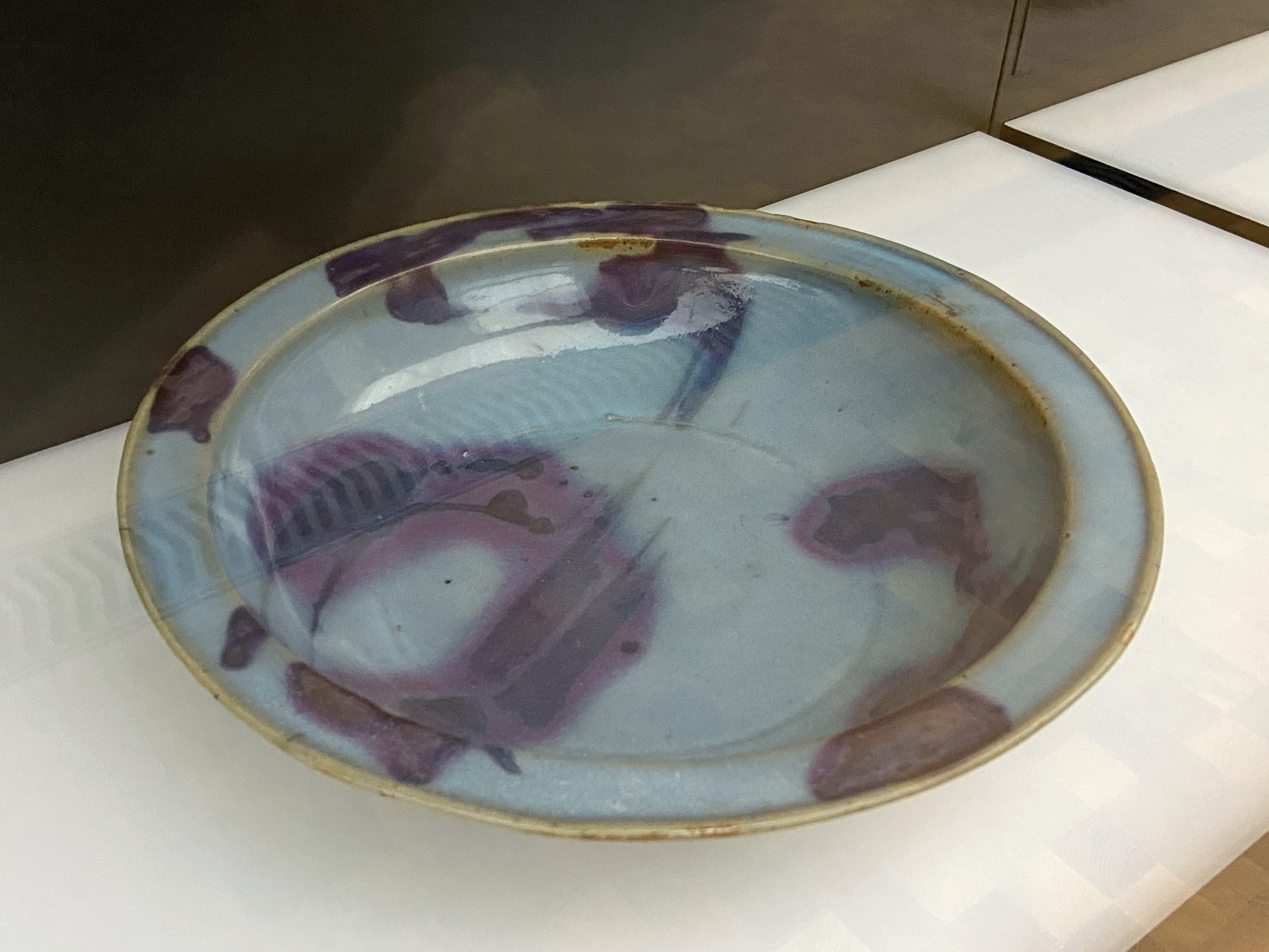

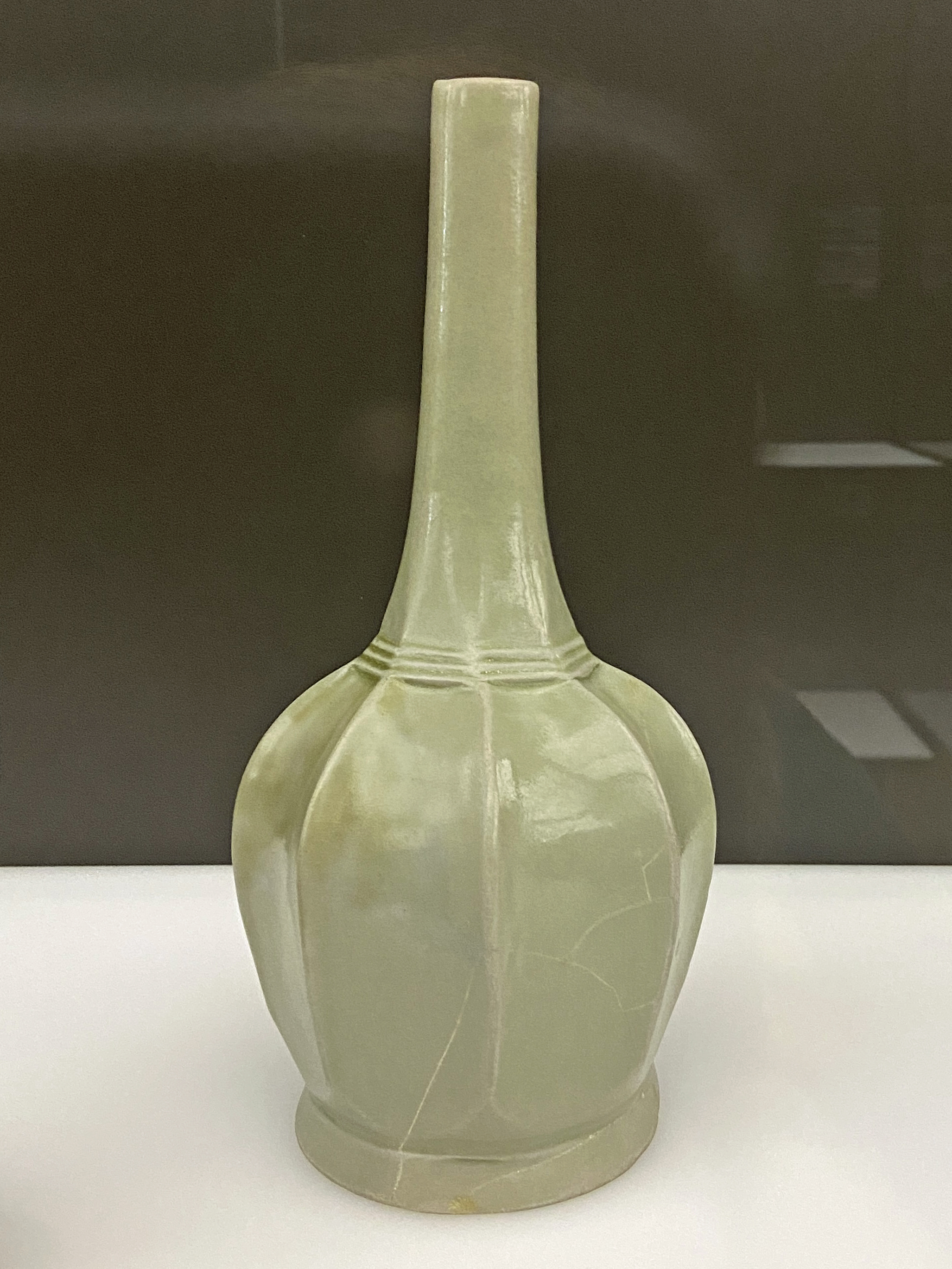

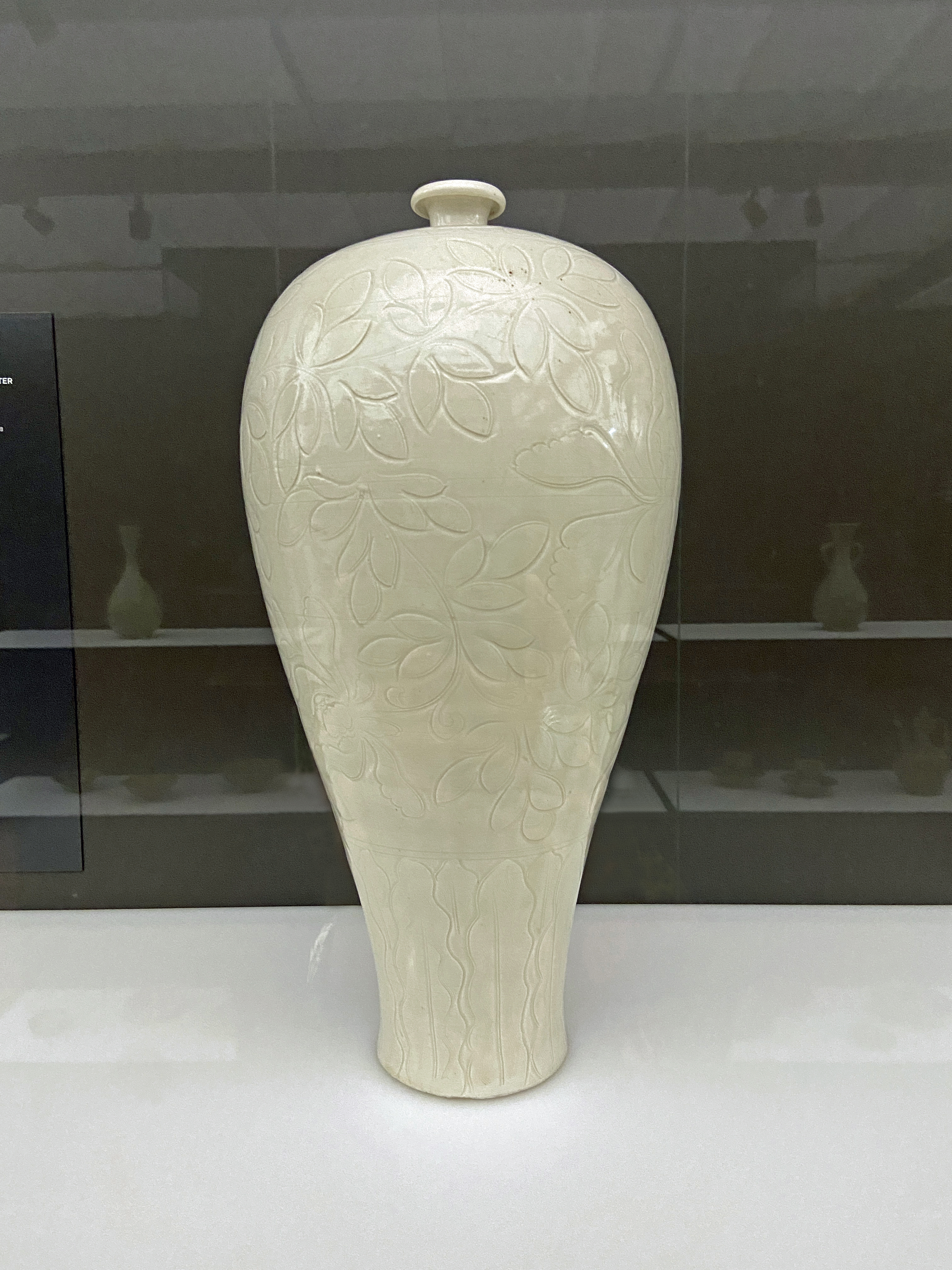

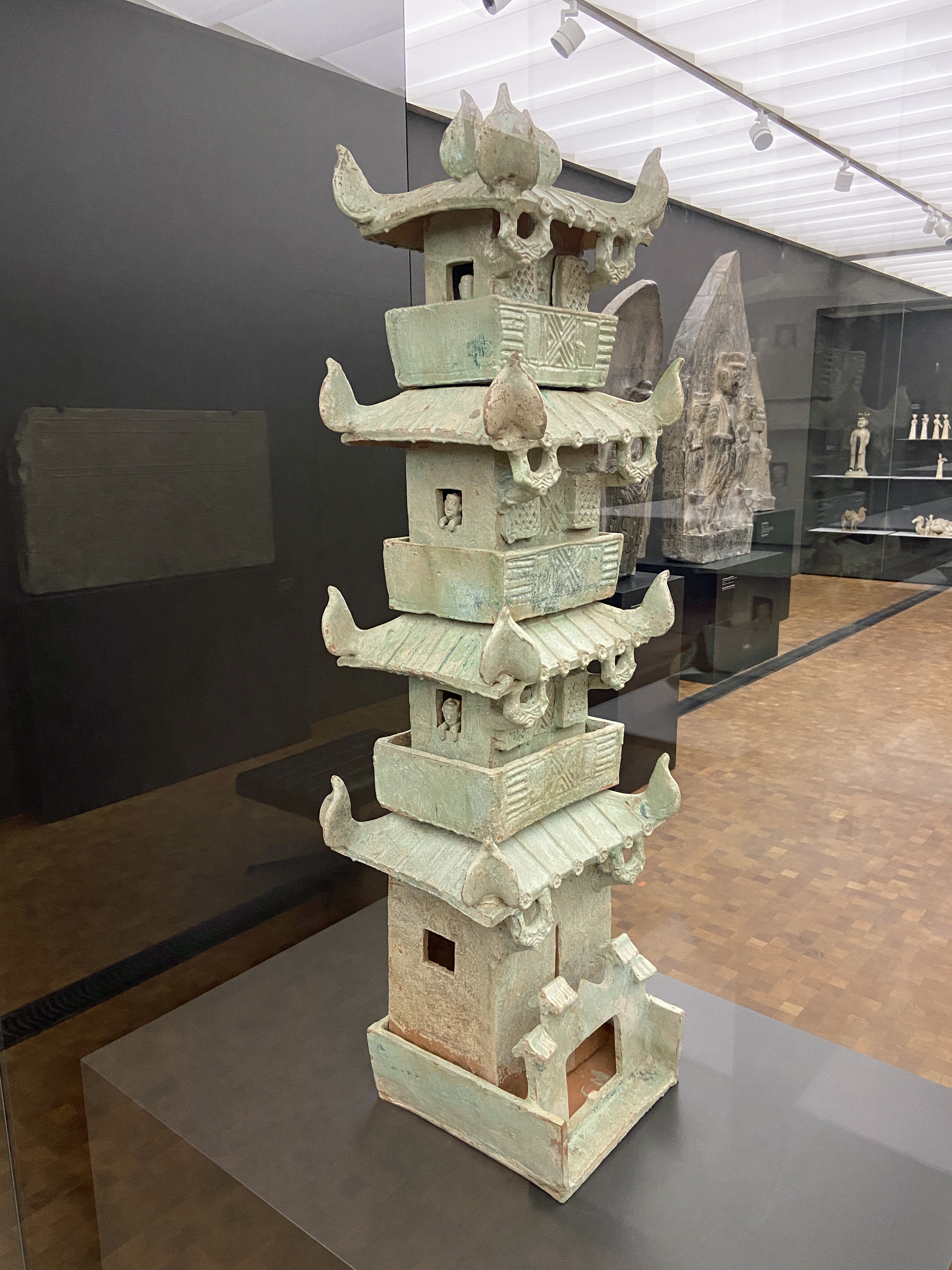
