= Rieterpark =

Park in Zurich, Switzerland

Coordinates: 47.3579°N 8.5305°E

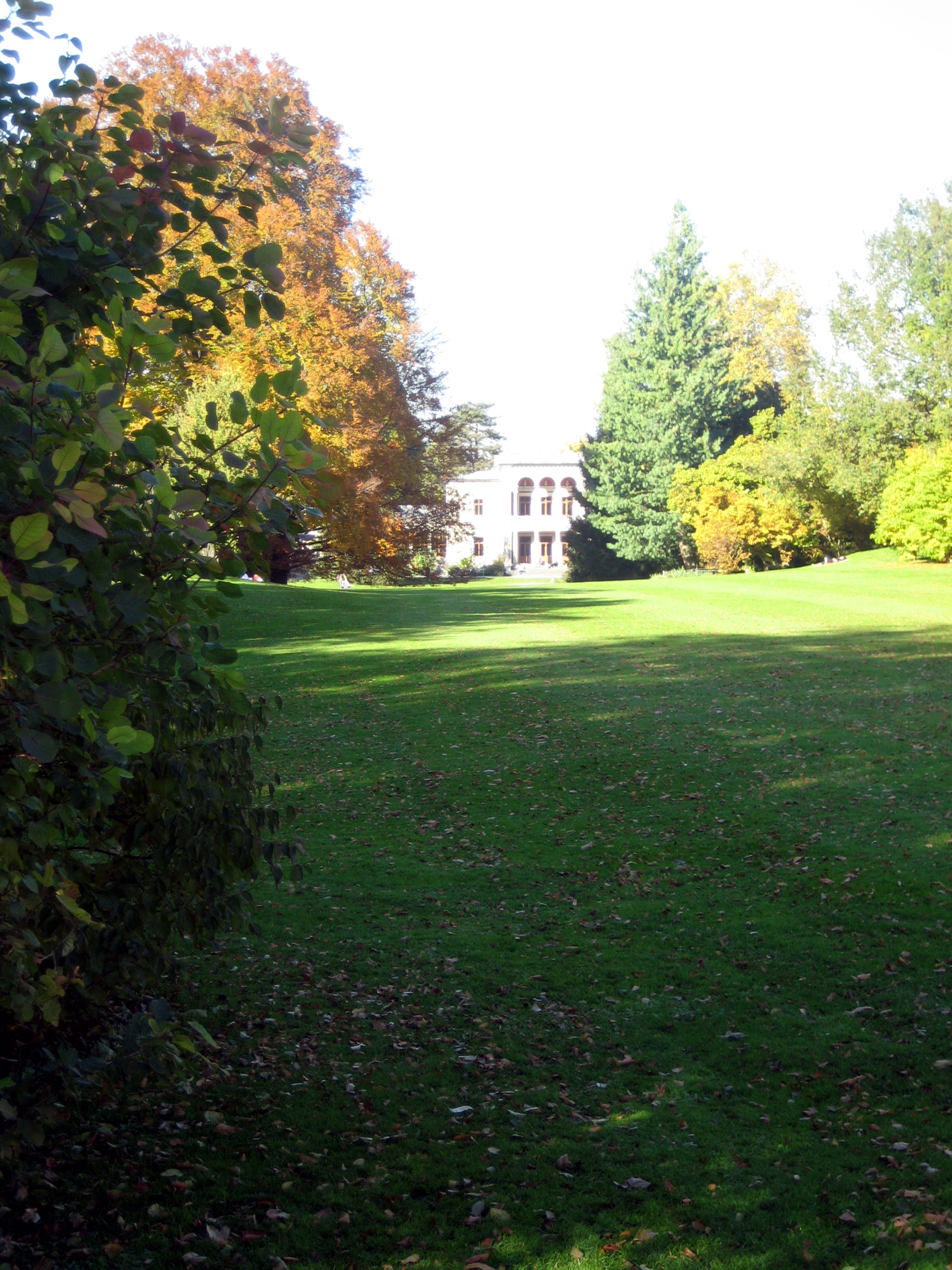
Rieterpark

The Rieterpark is a park in central Zurich, Switzerland. Richard Wagner lived at Villa Wesendonck in Rieterpark from 1849 to 1858 where he worked on Tristan.

== History ==
In the 19th century it was bought by the German merchant Otto Wesendonck in an independent municipality near Zurich. Through the well-known architect Leonhard Zeugheer, he established the Villa Wesendonck and hired the gardener Theodor Froebel to design the extensive park and gardens.

As a great patron of the arts, the Wesendoncks granted the house to Richard Wagner in 1849. Wagner had an affair there with Mathilde Wesendonck and finished in 1858 when he fled from Zurich. In 1871, the Wesendoncks eventually sold the mansion to the industrialist Rieter family along with the park grounds. After the death of Adolf Rieter Rotpletz in 1882, he left it to his son Fritz Rieter. Alfred Friedrich Bluntschli was hired to develop part of the property. In 1912, the German Emperor William II stayed several days at the villa as a guest. In 1887 Fritz Rieter further extended the property, with farm buildings and an orangery created by Adolf Brunner.

In 1945, after a referendum on the matter, the city of Zurich bought a 68,000 m2 large area of Rieterpark and Villa Wesendonck for 2.9 million francs from the Rieter family. Through a popular decision in 1949, the Villa Wesendonck was renovated and became a museum for non-European culture. Baron Eduard von der Heydt of the City of Zurich, donated and led to the establishment of the Rietberg Museum in 1952. This was extended in 2007.

The park has a notable pond and fountain and is used for classical concerts and theater.

On 26 December 1999 parts of the park were severely damaged by Cyclone Lothar.

== See also ==
- Tristan und Isolde
- Rietberg Museum
- Belvoirpark
