= Rietberg Museum =

Art museum in Zürich, Switzerland

Coordinates: 47.3589°N 8.5304°E

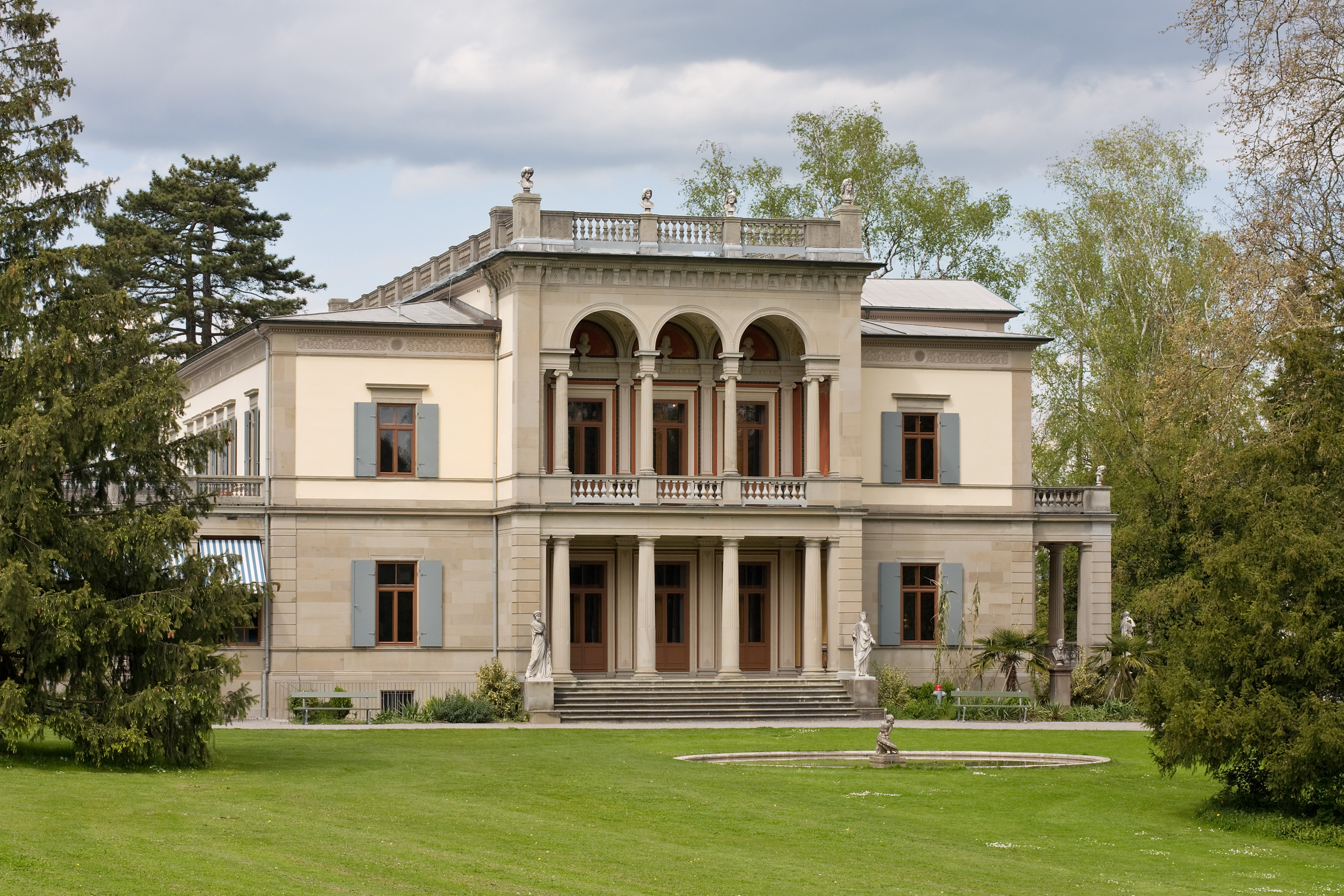
The Wesendonck Villa, the main building of the Rietberg Museum

The Rietberg Museum is a museum in Zürich, Switzerland, displaying Asian, African, American and Oceanian art. It is the largest art museum focusing on non-European art and design in Switzerland, the third-largest museum in Zürich, and the largest to be run by the city itself. In 2007, it received approximately 157,000 visitors.

== Location and buildings ==
The Rietberg Museum is situated in the Rieterpark in Zürich, and consists of several historic buildings: the Wesendonck Villa, the Remise (or "Depot"), the Rieter Park-Villa, and the Schönberg Villa. In 2007 a new building known as "Smaragd" was opened, designed by Alfred Grazioli and Adolf Krischanitz. The addition of this largely subterranean building more than doubled the museum's exhibition space.

The museum is located near Zürich Enge railway station, and can also be reached by tram line #7 and bus line #33.

== History ==
In the early 1940s, the city of Zürich purchased the Rieterpark and the Wesendonck Villa. In 1949, the villa was selected, by referendum, to be rebuilt into a museum for the art collection of Baron von der Heydt which he had donated to the city in 1945. This was carried out in 1951-52 under the architect Alfred Gradmann. The Rietberg Museum was opened on 24 May 1952. Johannes Itten, the Swiss expressionist painter, was director of the museum until 1956.

In 1976, the city acquired the Schönberg Villa, which had been threatened with demolition, and opened it in 1978 as an extension of the museum. Today, the villa is also home to an extensive non-lending library administrated by the museum.

== Organisation and funding ==
The Rietberg Museum is operated by the presidential department of the city of Zürich. In 2007, it employed around one hundred people. About half of the funding comes from the city, while the other half is raised through revenue, sponsors, and donations. Additions to the collection come mostly from donations.

The museum also houses many pieces from the Meiyintang Collection, which is hailed as one of the finest collections of Chinese ceramics in the Western world.

== Publishing activities ==
The museum established an in-house press shortly after its founding in 1952. Initially, it published catalogues of the museum's Asian and African artworks, as well as occasional short monographs. The museum's publishing activity has increased since 1985, in connection with the large special exhibitions that it has organised since then, and it now publishes around five new titles per year.

Since 1991, the museum also publishes Artibus Asiae, a biannual scholarly journal on the arts and archaeology of Asia.

== Sculpture ==
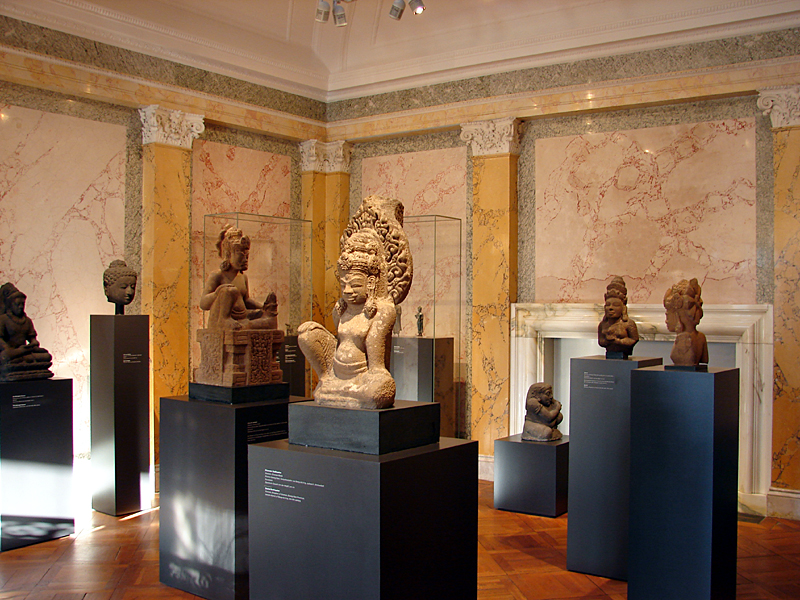
Exhibition room in the Wesendonck Villa

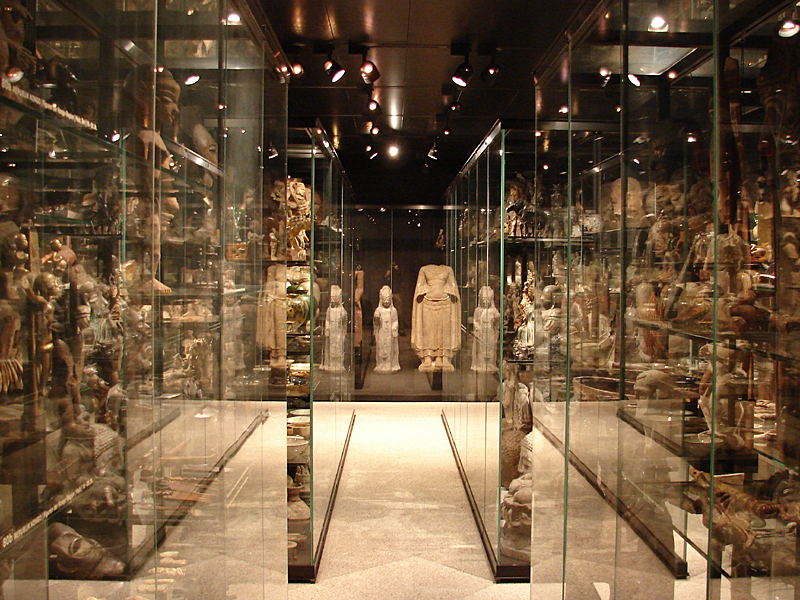
In the Depot

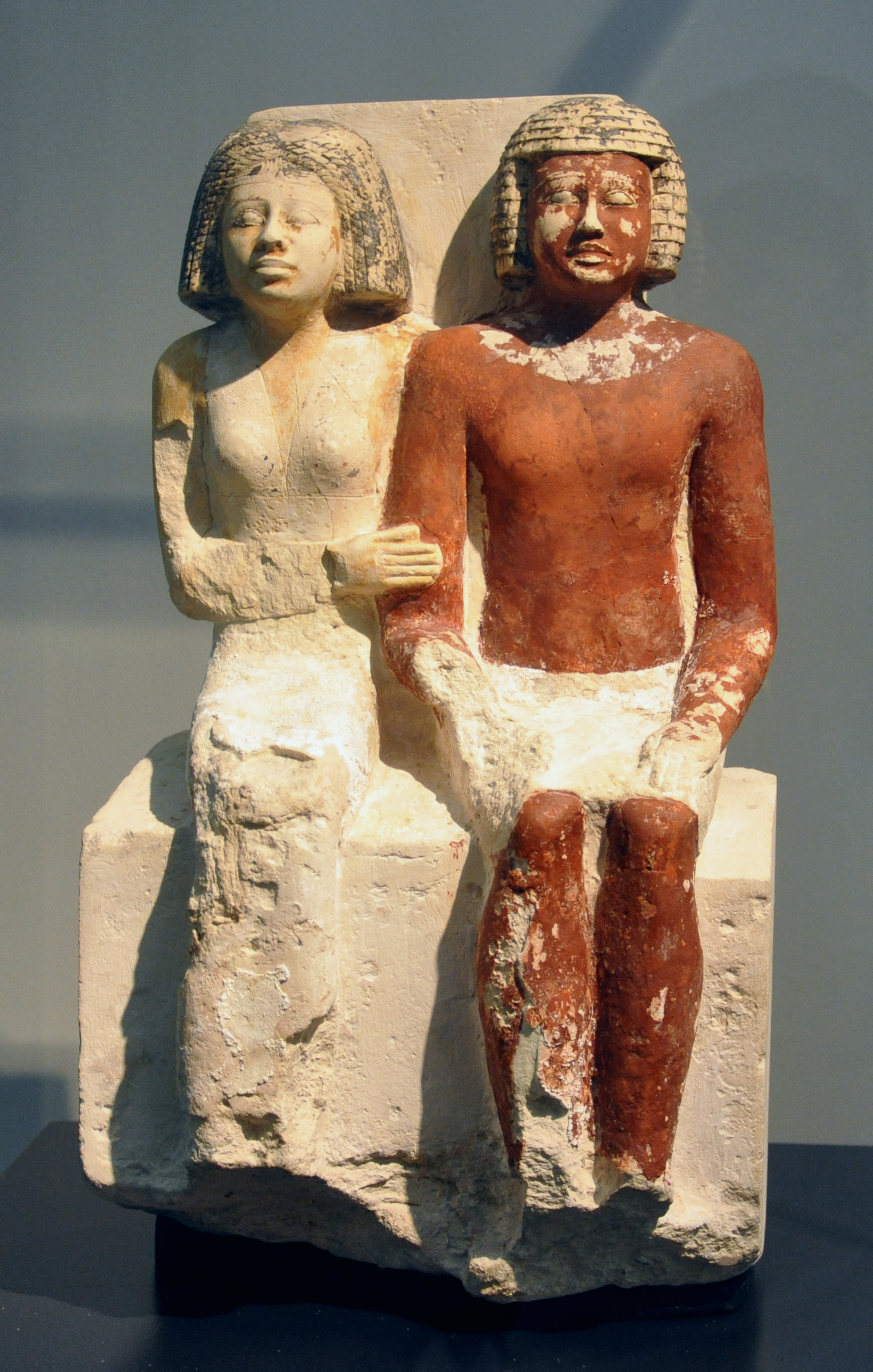
pair of figures, Egypt, Fifth Dynasty, c. 2400 BCE

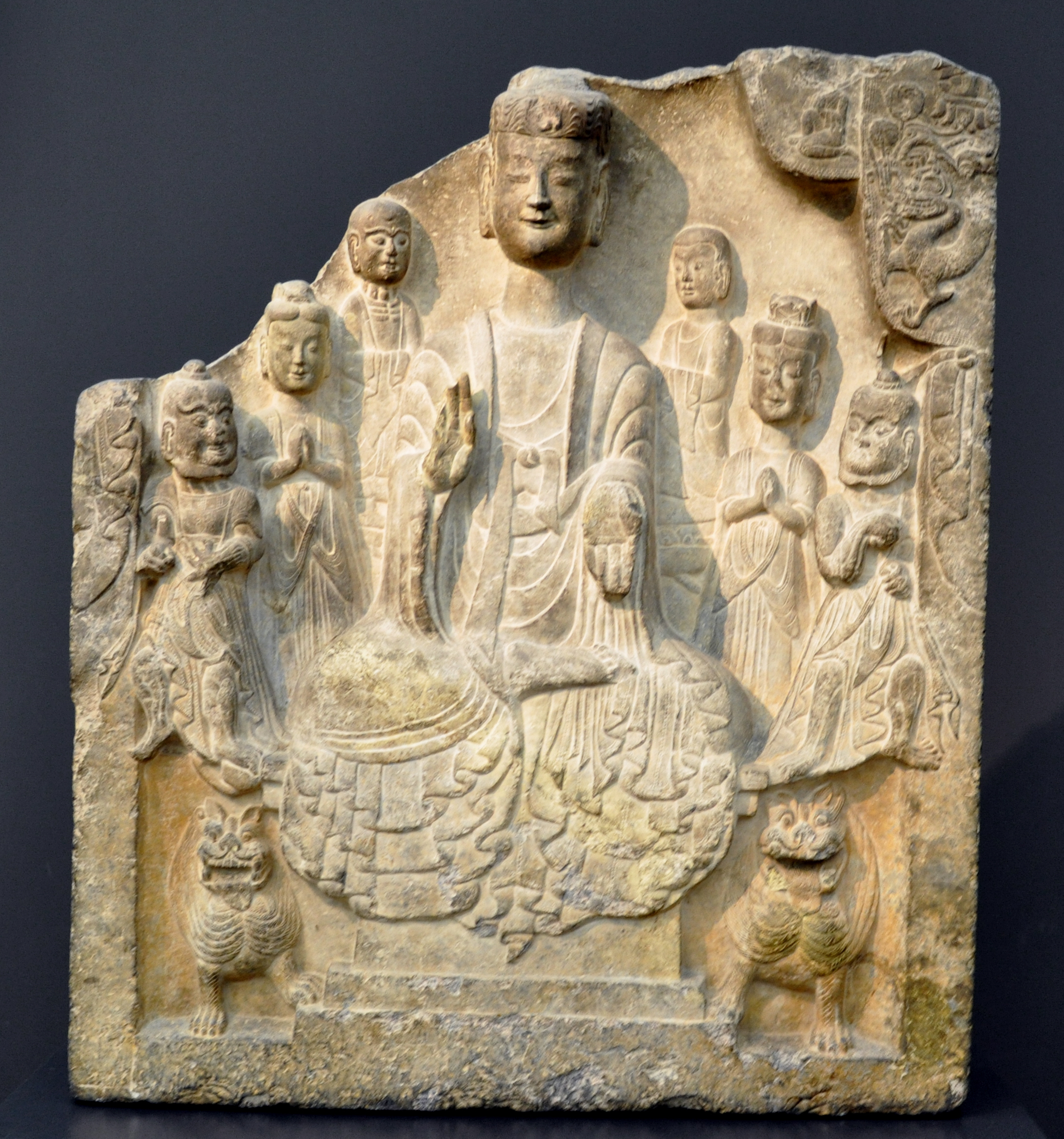
Votive stele with Buddha Shakyamuni, China, Eastern Wei Dynasty, c. 536 CE

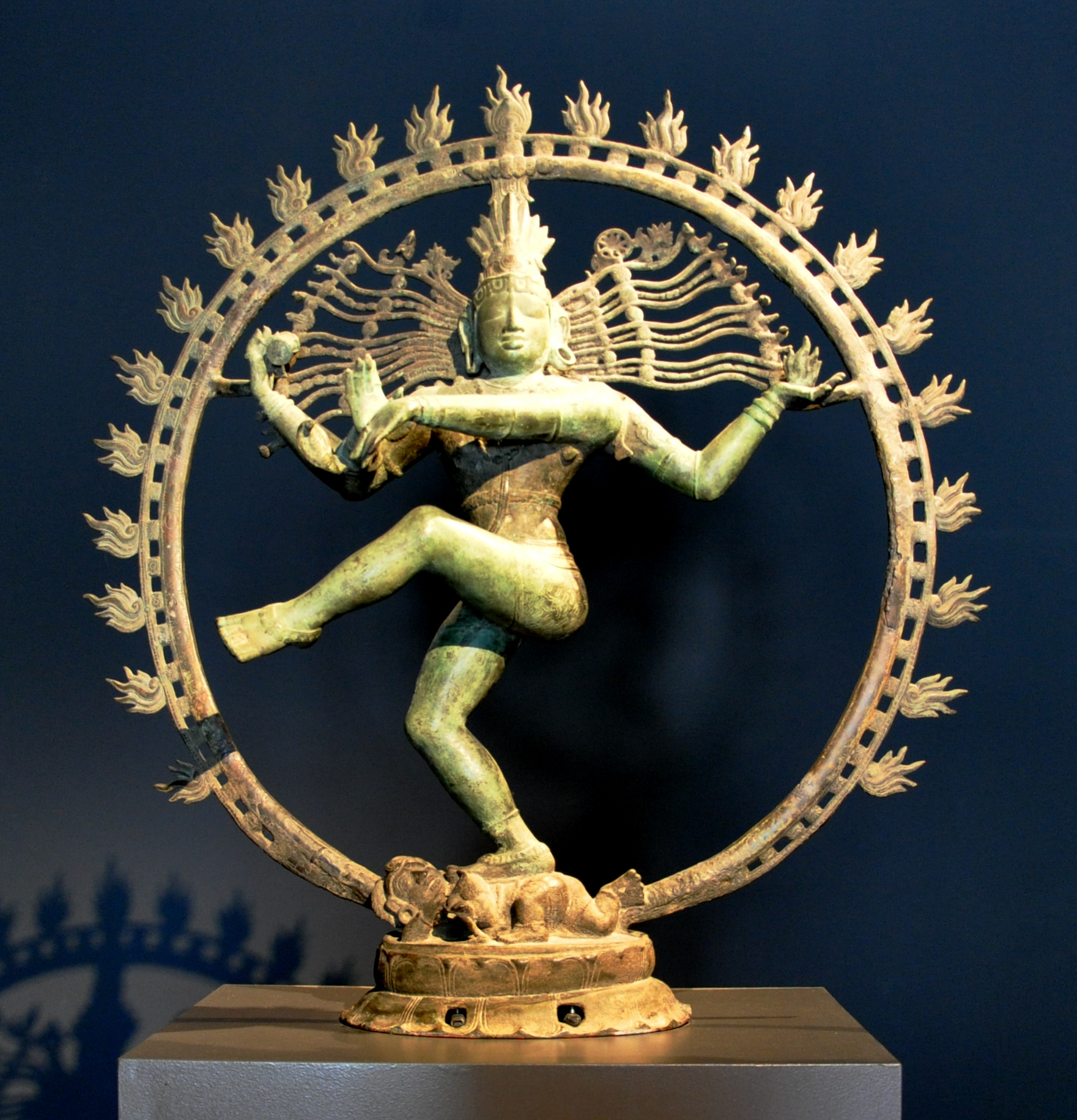
Shiva Nataraja, Chola dynasty, 12th century

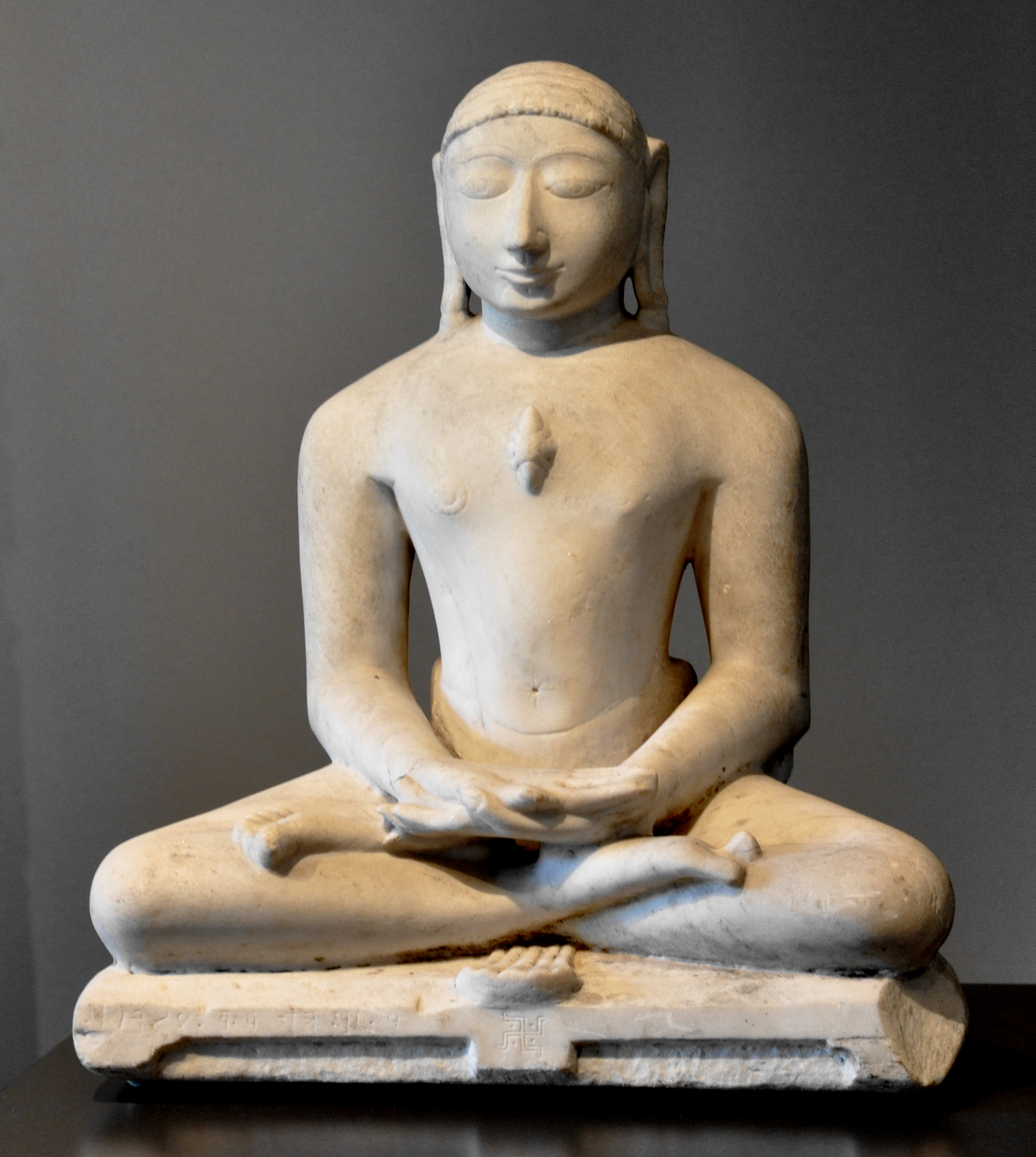
Idol of Suparśvanātha, the 7th Jain Tīrthankara, India, 14th century

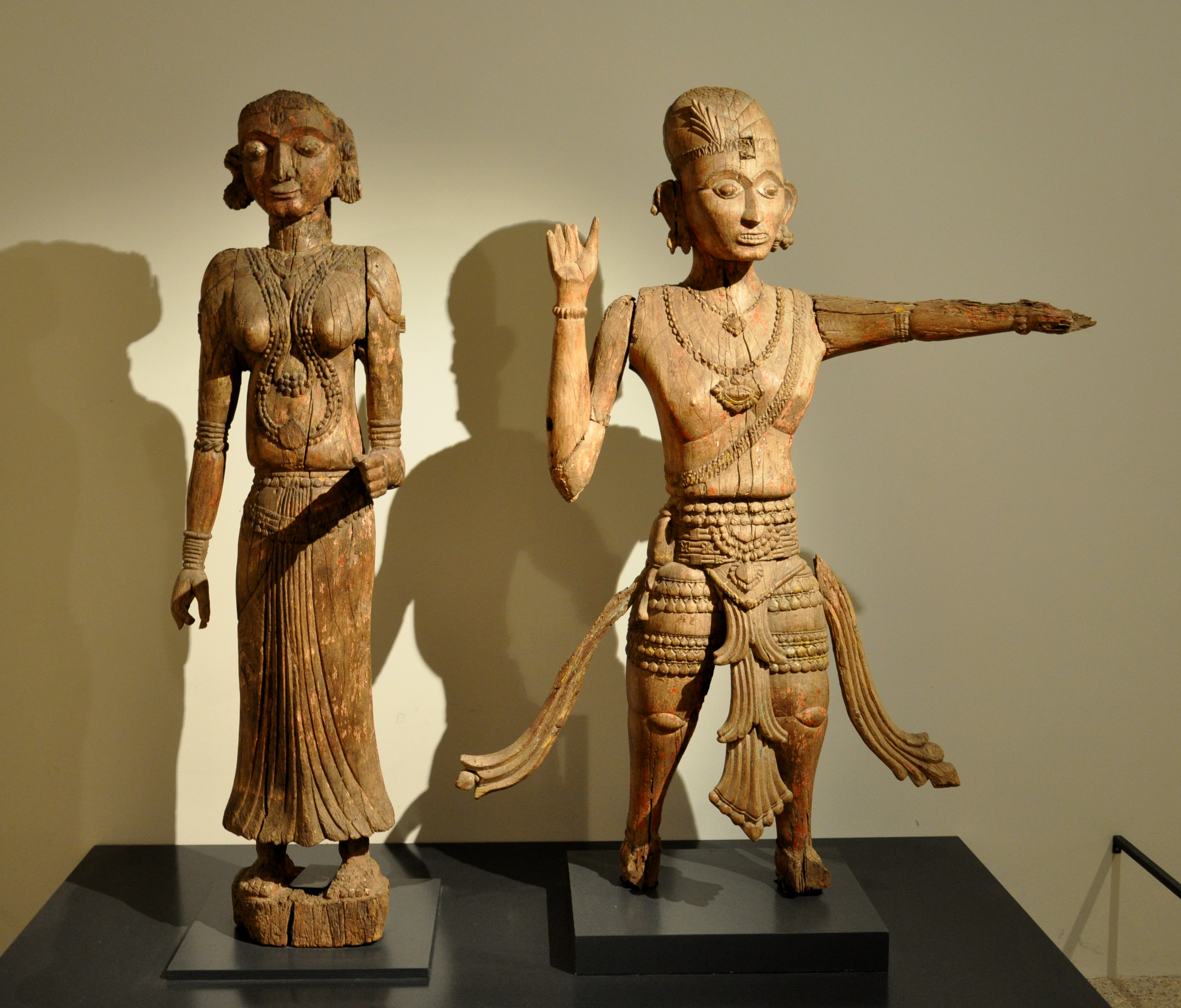
Abbaga Daraka Idol

== Painting ==
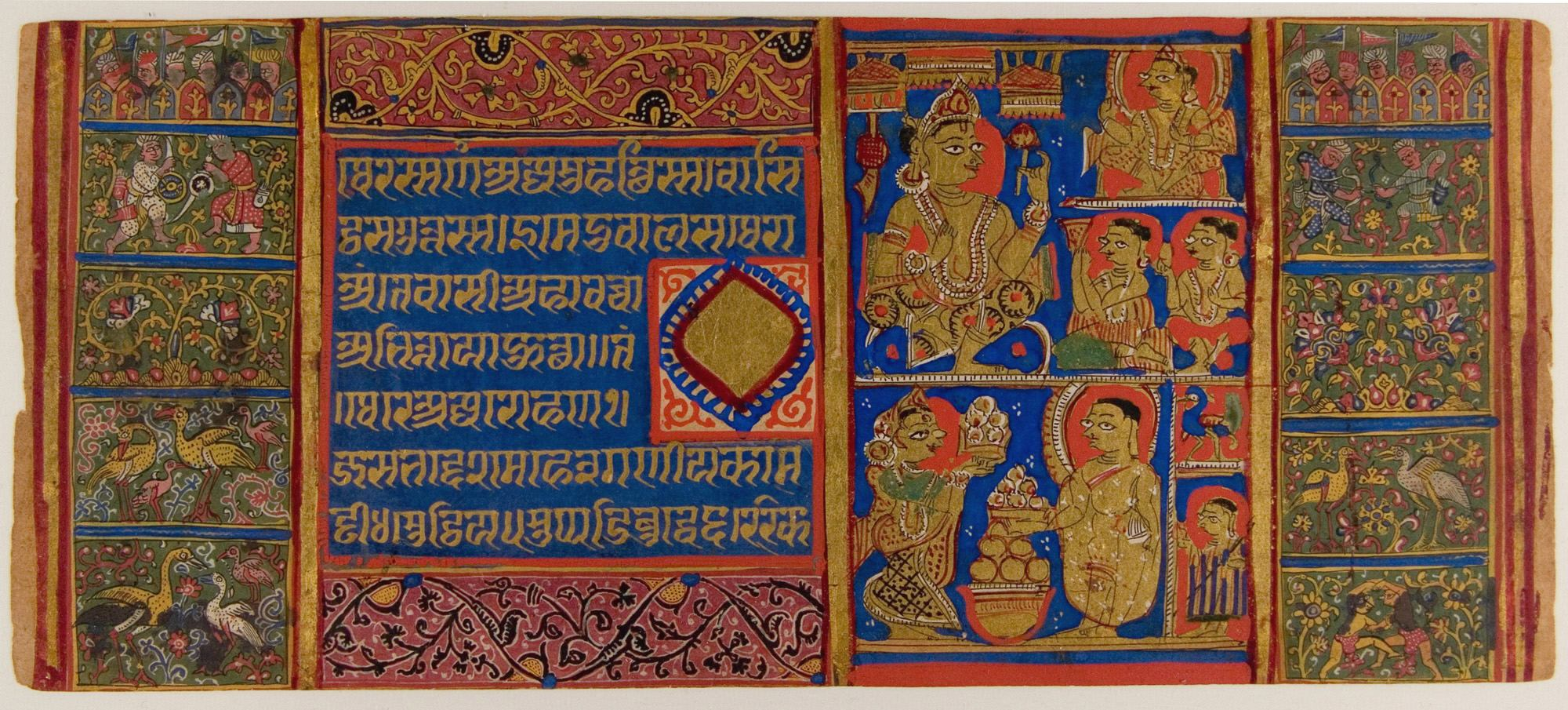
A Monk is Greeted at the Gate of the Coronation Hall. Folio from a Kalpasutra Manuscript. India, ca. 1475.

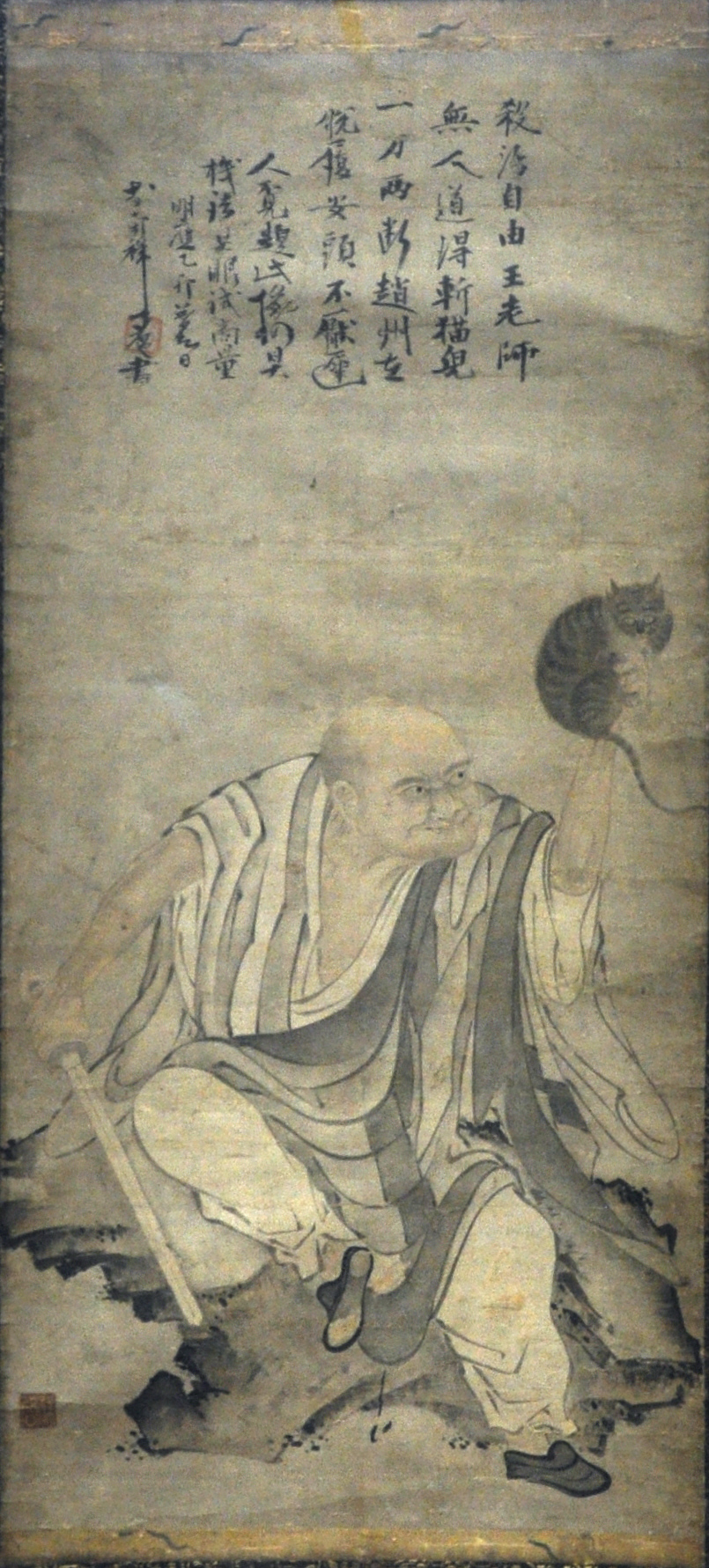
Nanquan Puyuan kills a cat by Shōkei Kenkō. Japan, 1495

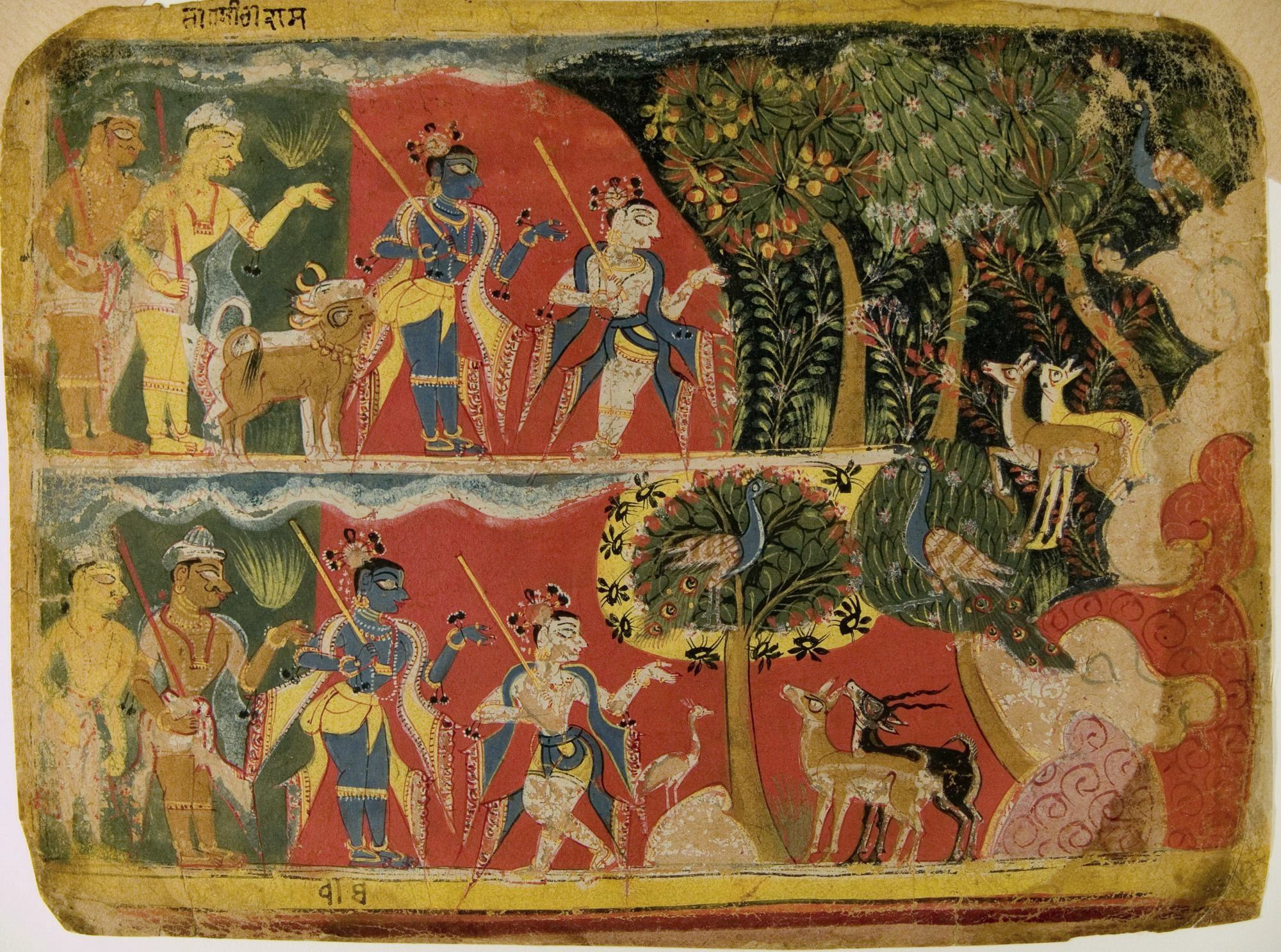
Krishna and Balarama Taking the Cattle to Graze. Folio from a Bhagavata Purana Manuscript. India, 1520–40

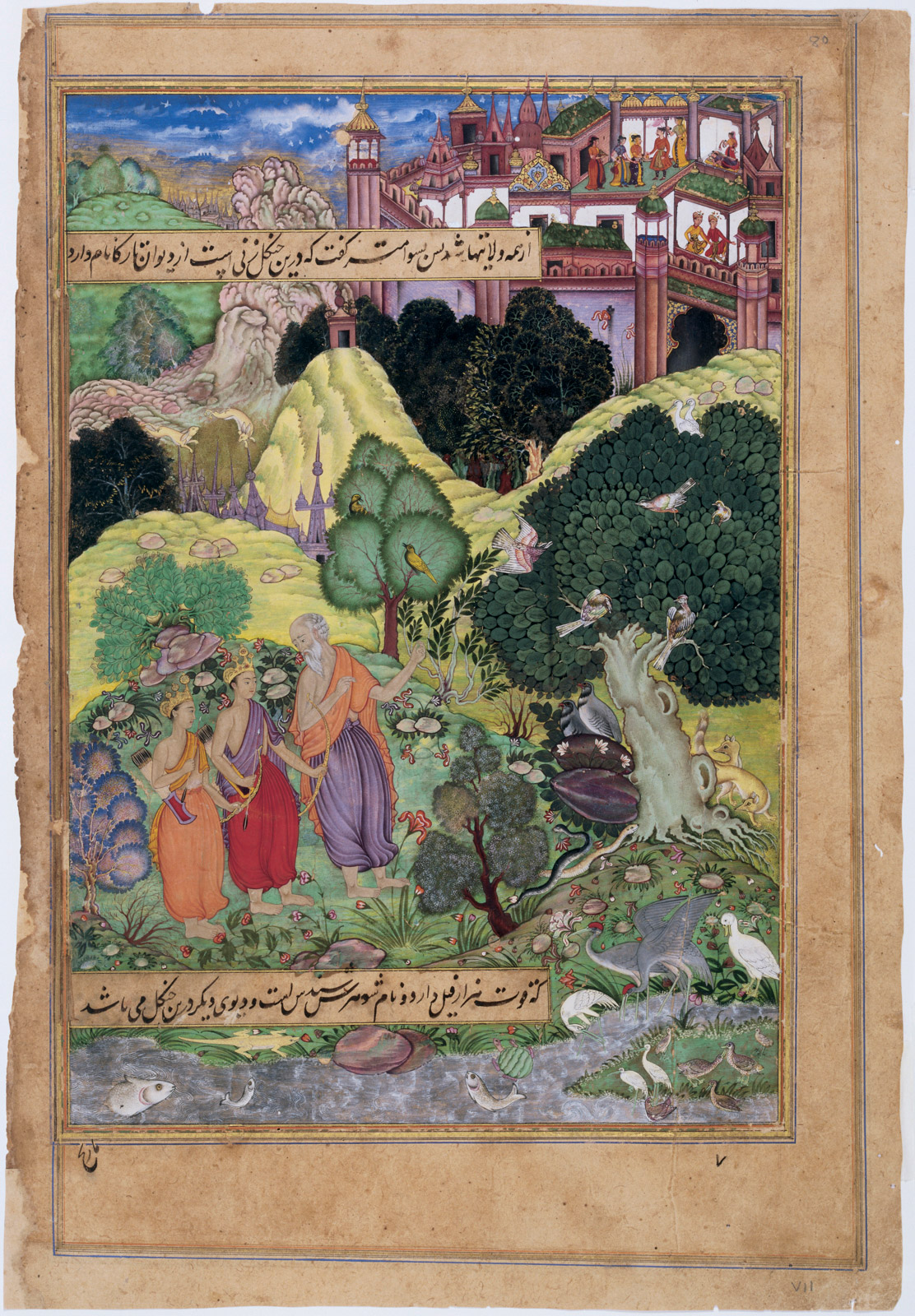
Vishwamitra brings Rama and Lakshmana to his hermitage. Folio from the Mughal Ramayana. India, c. 1594

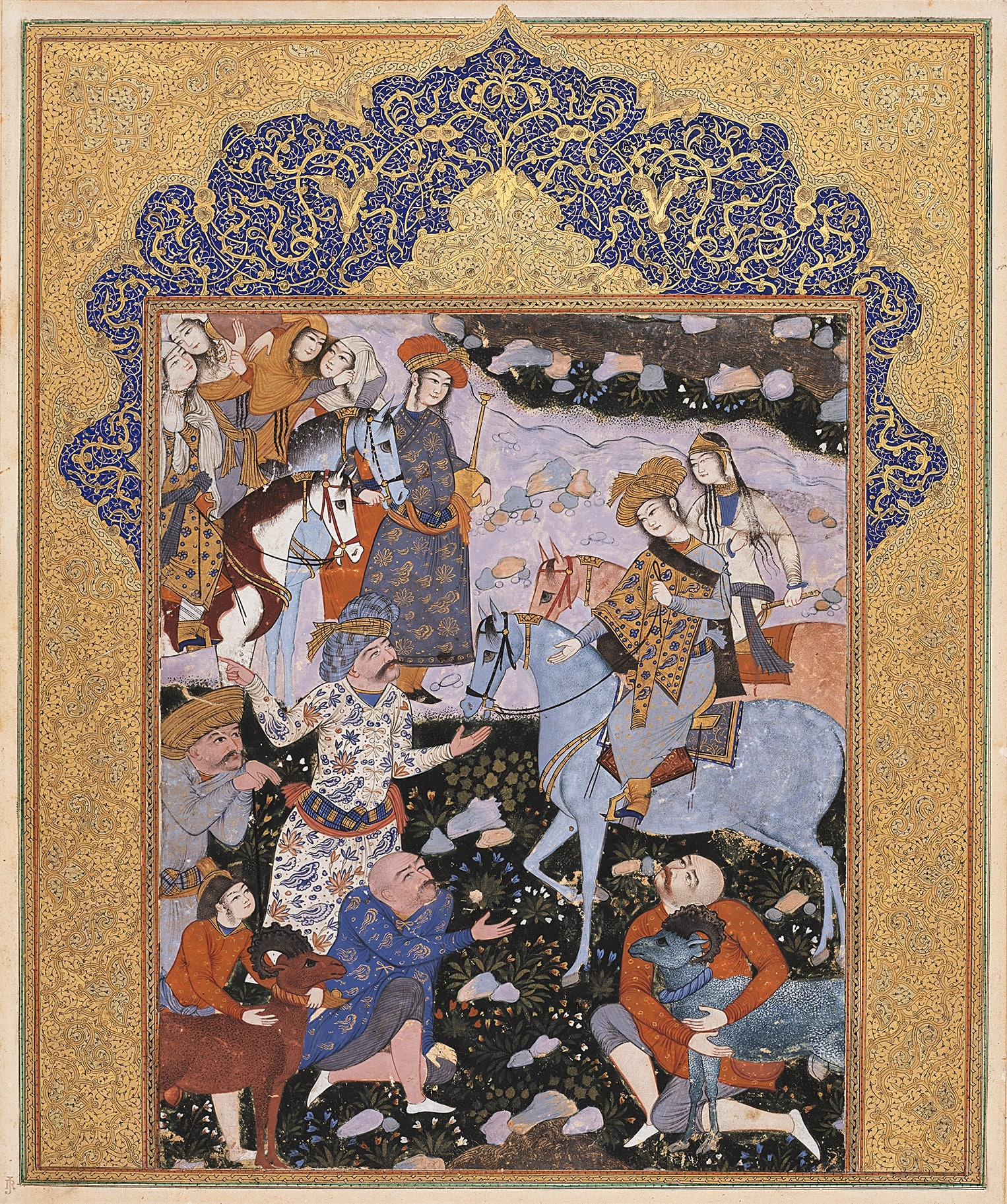
Shepherds and nobles welcome a mounted prince and princess. Attributed to Muhammad Qasim. Isfahan, ca. 1648

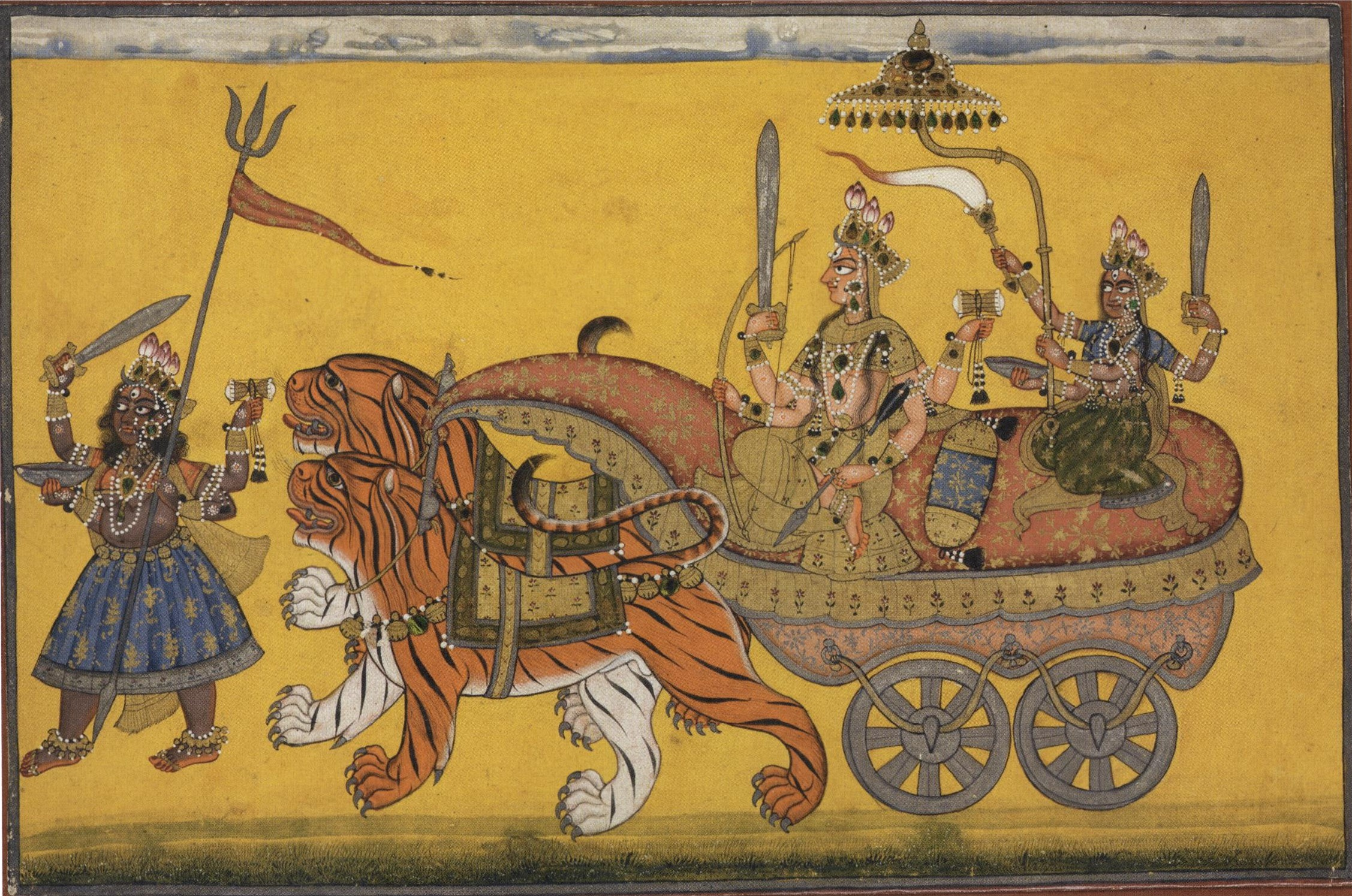
The Devi Rides in State. Folio from a Devi series attributed to Kripal of Nurpur. Nurpur, c. 1670

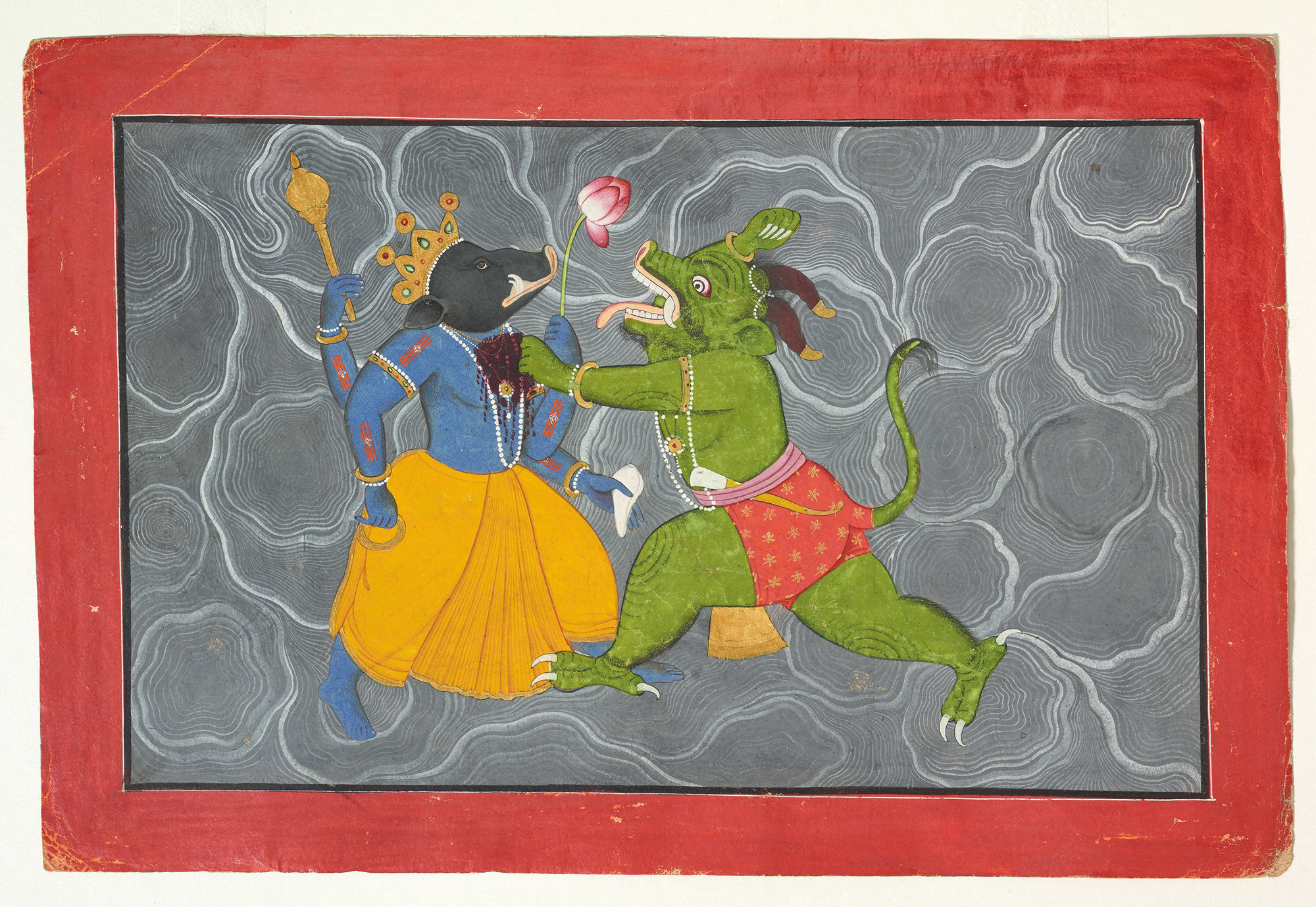
Varaha and Hiranyaksha. Folio from a Bhagavata Purana Series by Manaku of Guler. Guler, c. 1740

== See also ==
- List of museums in Switzerland
