= Yunnan Normal University =

Provincial University in Kunming, Yunnan, China

- 云南师范大学
- Motto: 刚毅坚卓
- Type: Public university
- Established: 1938; 88 years ago
- President: Hu Jinming
- Academic staff: 3,792 (Apr 2024)
- Students: 45,065 (Apr 2024)
- Undergraduates: 30,295 (Apr 2024)
- Postgraduates: 8,278 (Apr 2024)
- Doctoral students: 492 (Apr 2024)
- Location: Kunming, Yunnan, China; 25°03′30″N 102°41′40″E
- Campus: 189.8 hectares (469 acres)
- Mascot: Potato baby
- Website: ynnu.edu.cn

Chinese name
- Simplified Chinese: 云南师范大学
- Traditional Chinese: 雲南師範大學
Transcriptions
Standard Mandarin
- Hanyu Pinyin: Yúnnán Shīfàn Dàxué

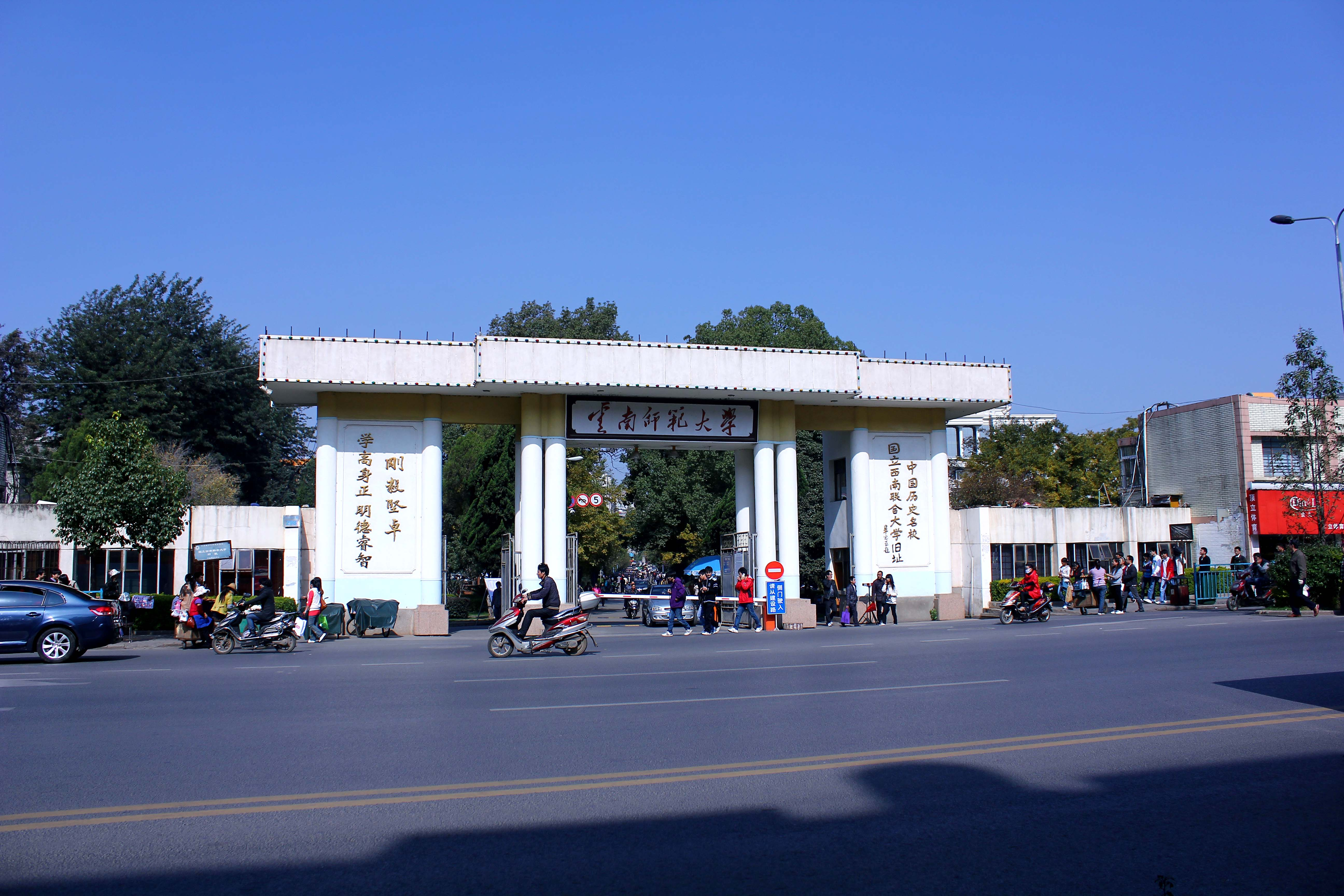
The main gate of Yunnan Normal University

Yunnan Normal University (云南师范大学; YNNU) is a provincial public normal university in Kunming, Yunnan, China. The university is co-sponsored by the Yunnan Province and the Ministry of Education.

== History ==
Established in 1938 as the Normal College of the National Southwestern Associated University based on Peking University, Tsinghua University, and Nankai University, it was named 'National Kunming Normal College' in 1946 when the faculties returned to the north.

After the war broke out in 1937, Peking University, Tsinghua University, and Nankai University moved to Kunming and merged into the National Southwest Associated University, which consisted of the Schools of Humanities, Science, Engineering, Business and Law, and the Teachers College. Following the end of the war, the three component universities moved back to their original sites in the north, but the Teachers College renamed National Kunming Teachers College, stayed behind to become an independent institution. In 1950, the word "National" was dropped from its name. A few decades later, in 1984, it acquired its present name, Yunnan Normal University.

== Facilities ==
YNNU covers an area of 2,847 mu (about 469 acres). It consists of 26 schools and more than 40 research centers and institutes. It has over 30,000 full-time students pursuing degrees and more than 18,000 students of continuing education.
