= Modern archaeology =

Archaeological practices in the modern era

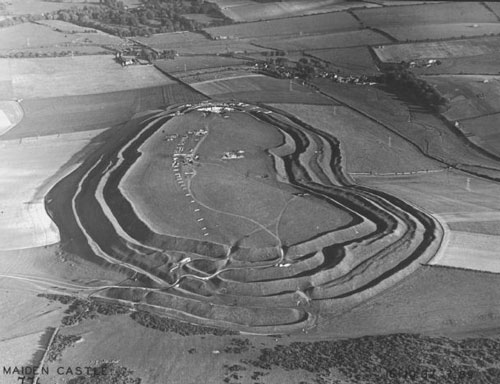
Mortimer Wheeler pioneered a system of excavation in the early 20th century. Pictured are his excavations at Maiden Castle, Dorset, in October 1937.

Modern archaeology is the discipline of archaeology which contributes to excavations.

Johann Joachim Winckelmann was one of the founders of scientific archaeology and first applied the categories of style on a large, systematic basis to the history of art. He was "the prophet and founding hero of modern archaeology". The next major figure in the development of archaeology was Mortimer Wheeler, whose highly disciplined approach to excavation and systematic coverage in the 1920s and 1930s brought the science into the modern era. Wheeler developed the grid system of excavation, which was further improved on by his student Kathleen Kenyon. The two constant themes in their attempts to improve archaeological excavation were first, to maintain strict stratigraphic control while excavating (for this purpose, the baulks between trenches served to retain a record of the strata that had been dug through), and second, to publish a record of the excavation promptly and in a form that would tell the story of the site to the intelligent reader.

Bomb damage during the Second World War and subsequent rebuilding gave archaeologists the opportunity to meaningfully examine inhabited cities for the first time. Bombed sites provided windows onto the development of European cities whose pasts had been buried beneath working buildings. Urban archaeology necessitated a new approach as centuries of human occupation had created deep layers of stratigraphy that could often only be seen through the keyholes of individual building plots. In Britain, post-war archaeologists such as W. F. Grimes and Martin Biddle took the initiative in studying this previously unexamined area and developed the archaeological methods now employed in much cultural resource management and rescue archaeology.

Archaeology increasingly became a professional activity during the first half of the 20th century. Although the bulk of an excavation's workforce would still consist of volunteers, it would normally be led by a professional. It was now possible to study archaeology as a subject in universities and other schools, and by the end of the 20th century nearly all professional archaeologists, at least in developed countries, were graduates of such programs.

== New technology ==
Undoubtedly the major technological development in 20th century archaeology was the introduction of radiocarbon dating, based on a theory first developed by American scientist Willard Libby in 1949. Despite its many limitations (compared to later methods it is inaccurate; it can only be used on organic matter; it is reliant on a dataset to calibrate it; and it only works with remains from the last 10,000 years), the technique brought about a revolution in archaeological understanding. For the first time, it was possible to put reasonably accurate dates on discoveries such as bones. This in some cases led to a complete reassessment of the significance of past finds. Classic cases included the Red Lady of Paviland. It was not until 1989 that the Catholic Church allowed the technique to be used on the Turin Shroud, indicating that the linen fibres were of medieval origin.

Other developments, often spin-offs from wartime technology, led to other scientific advances. For field archaeologists, the most significant of these was the use of the geophysical survey. This encompasses a number of remote sensing techniques, such as aerial photography and satellite imagery. Also used is light detection and ranging (LIDAR), a technology that measures the height of the ground surface and other features in large areas of landscape with resolution and accuracy that was not previously available. Subsurface remote sensing techniques such as magnetometry and ground-penetrating radar enable an advanced picture to be built up of what lies beneath the soil before excavation even commences. The entire Roman town of Viroconium, modern day Wroxeter, has been surveyed by these methods, though only a small portion has actually been excavated. The application of physical sciences to archaeology, known as archaeometry or archaeological science, is now a major part of archaeology.

Archaeology has also come to use geographic information systems, designed to capture, store, manipulate, analyze, manage, and visualize all types of geospatial data.

The discovery in 1991 in the Ötztaler Alps of the prehistorical mummy dubbed Ötzi resulted in the techniques of genetics being brought to bear on archaeological science. With the help of DNA analysis, scholars were able to ascertain that Ötzi does not belong to any known human population. In the subsequent years, genetics has helped us reconstruct human migrations that occurred during prehistory.

== Bibliography ==
- Clunas, Craig (2004). Superfluous Things: Material Culture and Social Status in Early Modern China. Honolulu: University of Hawaii Press. p. 97. ISBN 0-8248-2820-8.

Attribution: text copied from Old revision of History of archaeology, see there for edit history.
