= Margaret Collingridge Wheeler =

Australian archaeologist

Margaret Collingridge Wheeler, Lady Wheeler (1916–1990, née Collingridge, first married surname Norfolk, commonly known as Kim), was an Australian archaeologist who worked at Maiden Castle, Dorset with Mortimer Wheeler in the 1930s and at Jericho and Jerusalem with Dame Kathleen Kenyon in the 1950s and 1960s. She authored books about archaeology for a general audience.

== Biography ==
Born in 1916 in Sydney, Australia, Collingridge Wheeler went to England to be educated. In 1935 she joined the excavation team at Maiden Castle, Dorset where Mortimer Wheeler and his first wife Tessa Wheeler were directing the examination of the Iron Age British hill fort. Several other notable women archaeologists took part in this excavation, including Veronica Seton-Williams, Joan du Plat Taylor, Leslie Scott, Rachel Maxwell-Hyslop, and Margot Eates. She undertook a degree at the Institute of Archaeology in London. She went on to be a student at the British School at Rome.

Collingridge Wheeler joined Wheeler's excavation at Camp d'Artus near Huelgoat, Finistère, Brittany in 1938 and subsequent explorations in Normandy in 1939. Wheeler's biographer Jacquetta Hawkes noted that Wheeler had developed romantic feelings for Collingridge Wheeler by this stage, although he married Mavis de Vere Cole in 1939, three years after the death of his first wife Tessa.

Collingridge Wheeler worked on the excavation of the tombs of Tsambres and Aphendrika at Agios Philion in Cyprus in 1938.

Collingridge Wheeler joined the ATS during the Second World War and learned range-finding. She met a childhood friend, Robert Norfolk, a submarine commander, whom she married. In 1941, Norfolk's submarine HMS Thorn went down in the Eastern Mediterranean. In 1945 she married Sir Mortimer Wheeler when Wheeler was Director-General of Archaeology in India. She travelled extensively with Wheeler to sites in India, Iran and Afghanistan.

In 1954, Collingridge Wheeler joined Dame Kathleen Kenyon's excavations at Jericho. Her book Walls of Jericho (1956) describes the excavation and personnel. In the 1960s Collingridge Wheeler joined Kenyon's excavations at Jerusalem.

Her other publications included A Book of Archaeology and A Second Book of Archaeology. Her obituary in The Times noted her reputation for producing popular books on the discipline.

From 1979 onwards Collingridge Wheeler assisted at the University of Sydney excavations at Pella in Jordan as a cataloguer and registrar.

Collingridge Wheeler was a devout Roman Catholic, and although separated from Wheeler in 1956, they never divorced. He died in 1976. Collingridge Wheeler died in 1990.

== Selected publications (as Margaret Wheeler) ==
- 1956. Walls of Jericho. London: Chatto and Windus.
- 1957. A Book of Archaeology. London: Cassell & Co.
- 1959. A Second Book of Archaeology. London: Cassell & Co.
- 1967. Editor. History Was Buried. A Source Book of Archaeology. London: Hart Publishing Company.

== Sources ==
- Carr, L. 2012. Tessa Verney Wheeler: Women and Archaeology Before World War Two. Oxford: Oxford University Press.
- Cornwall, T. 1958. Digging Without Malice. The New Scientist. 6 December, pp. 50–51.
- Davis, M. 2008. Dame Kathleen Kenyon: Digging Up the Holy Land. Walnut Creek, California: Left Coast Press.
- Hawkes, J. 1982. Mortimer Wheeler: Adventurer in Archaeology. London: Weidenfeld and Nicolson.
- Kenyon, K. 1957. Digging Up Jericho. London: Ernest Benn.
- Matthews, R. 2003. The Archaeology of Mesopotamia: Theories and Approaches. London: Routledge.
- The Times. 1990. Lady Wheeler. Obituary, 26 December, p. 10.
- Wheeler, R. E. M. 1943. Maiden Castle, Dorset. Oxford: Oxford University Press for the Society of Antiquaries. hdl:20.500.12657/27681
