= Buried Treasure (TV programme) =

Archaeology show

- Genre: documentary
- Showrunner: Paul Johnstone
- Presented by: Glyn Daniel, Mortimer Wheeler
- Country of origin: United Kingdom
- Original language: English

Production
- Running time: 30 minutes

Original release
- Network: BBC
- Release: 1954 – 1959

Buried Treasure was a television programme about archaeology which was produced and broadcast by the BBC from 1954 to 1959. The producer was Paul Johnstone and the main presenters were Glyn Daniel and Mortimer Wheeler.

Each programme would focus on a particular site such as Stonehenge or Jericho and was shot on location. The programme would explain the site, its story and its place in history. Besides the main presenters, other experts would be consulted so that the scholarship was of the highest standard.
