= Michael Mortimer Wheeler =

British lawyer (1915–1992)

Michael Mortimer Wheeler QC (8 January 1915 – 7 August 1992) was a British barrister.

== Early life and education ==
The son of archaeologists Mortimer and Tessa Wheeler, he attended the Dragon School and Rugby School before going on to study law at Christ Church, Oxford.

== Legal career and military service ==
Wheeler first worked at a solicitor's office, and was called to the Bar in 1938 from Gray's Inn, being also admitted ad eundem to Lincoln's Inn on 13 March 1946. Having joined the Territorial Army, during the Second World War he served in the Royal Artillery regiment (the 48th Light Anti-Aircraft Battery, later combined with the 69th and 79th LAA Batteries to form the 21st Light Anti-Aircraft Regiment for service overseas) formed and commanded by his father, who unconventionally commissioned him as a second lieutenant, this appointment subsequently confirmed by the War Office. By the end of the war he had risen to the rank of lieutenant colonel and was mentioned in dispatches. After the war he returned to practising law. He was appointed Queen's Counsel in 1961, elected a Bencher of Lincoln's Inn in 1967, and Treasurer in 1986. He also served as a deputy High Court judge for fifteen years, before his retirement in 1986.

One of Wheeler's pupils at the Bar was the Yorkshire cricketer Geoffrey Keighley; his fees were paid – in light of Wheeler's ambition that the Bar should beat the Barristers' Clerks at the annual cricket match held at the Oval – in a course of lessons under the test cricketer Alf Gover.

== Personal life ==
Wheeler married Sheila Mayou, an orthoptist, in 1939. They had two daughters.
