= Glyn Daniel =

Welsh scientist and archaeologist

- Born: 23 April 1914; Lampeter Velfrey, Pembrokeshire, Wales
- Died: 13 December 1986 (aged 72)
- Citizenship: United Kingdom

Academic background
- Education: Cardiff University; St John's College, Cambridge

Academic work
- Discipline: Archaeology
- Sub-discipline: Prehistory; chamber tombs; megaliths; history of archaeology
- Institutions: St John's College, Cambridge; McDonald Institute for Archaeological Research

Glyn Edmund Daniel FBA FRAI (23 April 1914 – 13 December 1986) was a Welsh scientist and archaeologist who taught at Cambridge University, where he specialised in the European Neolithic period. He was appointed Disney Professor of Archaeology in 1974 and edited the academic journal Antiquity from 1958 to 1985. In addition to early efforts to popularise archaeological study and antiquity on radio and television, he edited several popular studies of the fields. He also published mysteries under the pseudonym Dilwyn Rees.

== Early life and education ==
Daniel was born in Lampeter Velfrey, Pembrokeshire, a small village between Narberth and Whitland in south-west Wales, as an only child. His father, John Daniel, was the village schoolmaster there. When Glyn Daniel was five he moved with his parents to Llantwit Major in the Vale of Glamorgan. He attended Barry County School for Boys in Barry, where his academic ability led to him being awarded a State Scholarship (which enabled him to go to the University of Cambridge) and a Glamorgan County Scholarship in 1931. The Glamorgan County Scholarship allowed Glyn Daniel to study geology at Cardiff University and the church organ at Llandaff Cathedral for a year. In 1932, he went up to St John's College, Cambridge, initially to read geography, and then archaeology and anthropology. He graduated with a first-class honours degree with distinction and remained at St John's for the rest of his academic career.

== World War II ==
During the Second World War, Daniel applied his talents at interpreting archaeological sites through aerial photography by working for the RAF's air photo reconnaissance unit at RAF Medmenham. He examined and analysed photos of enemy territory. In 1942, Daniel was sent to India to lead the Central Photographic Interpretation Section in Delhi, a mini-Medmenham for the South-East Asian theatre, ultimately achieving the rank of wing commander. A year after the war Daniel married one of his WAAF officers, Ruth Langhorne.

== Career ==
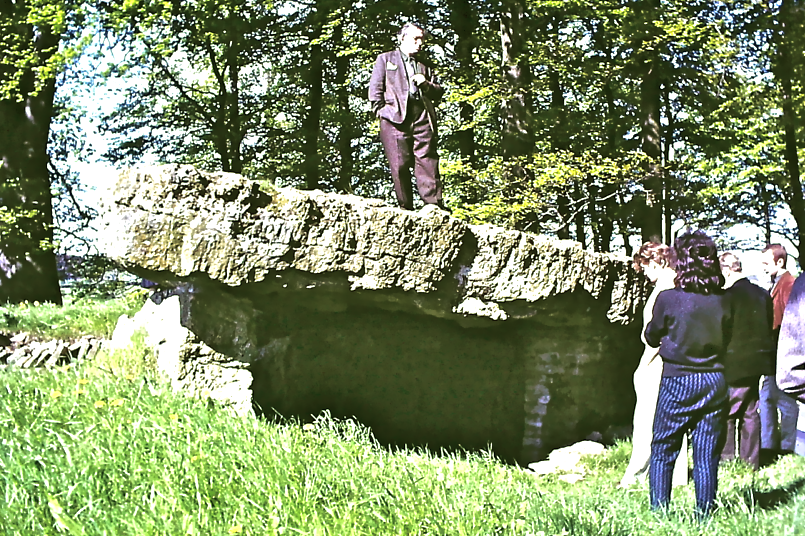
Glyn Daniel at the Tinkinswood Chambered Tomb in 1963 talking to Cambridge University students

After the war Daniel returned to Cambridge to resume his academic life. In the years 1954-56, he presented the BBC archaeology programme Buried Treasure, which featured guests such as Kathleen Kenyon, Sir Mortimer Wheeler, and actress Noelle Middleton. He became Disney Professor of Archaeology in 1974. From 1958 to 1985, he was editor of the academic journal Antiquity. His main subject of study was Neolithic chamber tombs, although he also wrote books on the history of archaeology and archaeological thought.

Daniel appeared on television. He was the host, often with Sir Mortimer Wheeler as a guest, of the game show Animal, Vegetable, Mineral?. He was named Television Personality of the Year in 1955. In 1981, he appeared as the guest on Desert Island Discs. He edited numerous popular studies of archaeological sites and cultures.

He died in Cambridge and the McDonald Institute, University of Cambridge, have named the Glyn Daniel Laboratory for Archaeogenetics in his memory.

== Academic works ==
- The Megalith Builders of Western Europe (1958), (1963 pbk edition, ASIN B0000CLTFM)
- The Prehistoric Chamber Tombs of France (1960),
- 150 Years of Archaeology (1976), and
- a number of articles in archaeological journals.
- His most accessible work for the general public is The Idea of Prehistory (1962), later updated in collaboration with Colin Renfrew, Edinburgh University Press, 1988.

== Detective fiction ==
Daniel published two detective fiction novels. The Cambridge Murders (1945) was published under the pseudonym Dilwyn Rees, and later re-published in 1965 by Penguin Books under his own name. Welcome Death was published under his own name in 1954. The detective in both novels is Sir Richard Cherrington, an eminent but slightly eccentric archaeologist who is the Vice-President of Fisher College. An obituary of Daniel by Norman Hammond in American Antiquity says that Sir Richard was "transparently based on Mortimer Wheeler".

Academic offices
Preceded by Grahame Clark	Disney Professor of Archaeology, Cambridge University; 1974–81	Succeeded by Colin Renfrew
Preceded by O. G. S. Crawford	Editor of Antiquity; 1958–1986	Succeeded by Christopher Chippindale
