= Mortimer Wheeler =

British archaeologist (1890–1976)

Sir Mortimer Wheeler CH CIE MC TD FSA FRS FBA
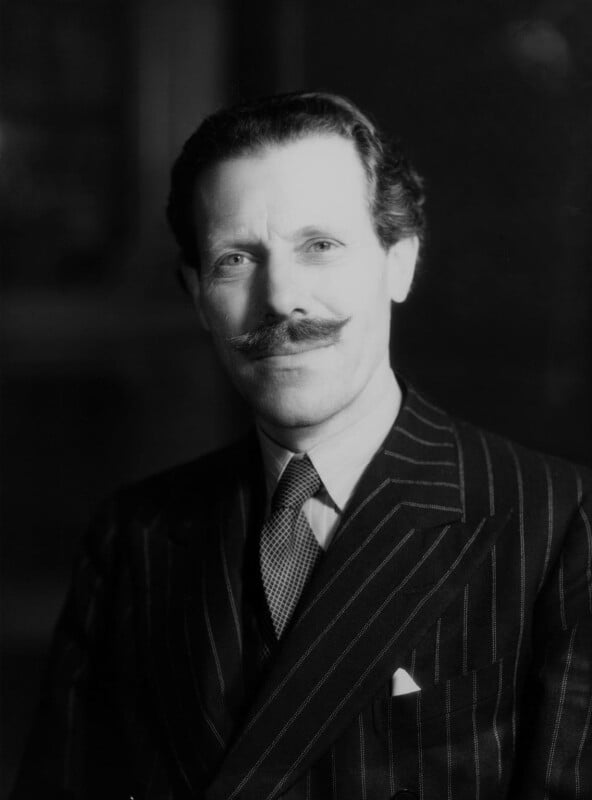
- Wheeler in 1939
- Born: Robert Eric Mortimer Wheeler; 10 September 1890; Glasgow, Scotland
- Died: 22 July 1976 (aged 85); Leatherhead, England
- Education: University College London
- Spouses: Tessa Verney (m. 1914; died 1936); Mavis de Vere Cole (m. 1939; div. 1942); Margaret Collingridge (m. 1945)
- Children: Michael Mortimer Wheeler
- Scientific career
- Fields: Archaeology
- Military career
- Allegiance: Great Britain
- Branch: British Army
- Service years: 1914–1921; 1939–1948
- Rank: Brigadier
- Unit: Royal Artillery
- Commands: 42nd Mobile Light Anti-Aircraft Regiment
- Conflicts: First World War; Western Front; Battle of Passchendaele; Italian Front; Hundred Days Offensive; Second Battle of Bapaume; Second World War; Western Desert campaign; Second Battle of El Alamein; Allied invasion of Italy
- Awards: Military Cross; Territorial Decoration

Sir Robert Eric Mortimer Wheeler (10 September 1890 – 22 July 1976) was a British archaeologist and officer in the British Army. Over the course of his career, he served as director of both the National Museum of Wales and London Museum, director-general of the Archaeological Survey of India, and the founder and honorary director of the Institute of Archaeology in London, in addition to writing twenty-four books on archaeological subjects.

Born in Glasgow to a middle-class family, Wheeler was raised largely in Yorkshire before moving to London in his teenage years. After studying classics at University College London (UCL), he began working professionally in archaeology, specialising in the Romano-British period. During World War I he volunteered for service in the Royal Artillery, being stationed on the Western Front, where he rose to the rank of major and was awarded the Military Cross. Returning to Britain, he obtained his doctorate from UCL before taking on a position at the National Museum of Wales, first as Keeper of Archaeology and then as director, during which time he oversaw excavation at the Roman forts of Segontium, Y Gaer, and Isca Augusta with the aid of his first wife, Tessa Wheeler. Influenced by the archaeologist Augustus Pitt Rivers, Wheeler argued that excavation and the recording of stratigraphic context required an increasingly scientific and methodical approach, developing the "Wheeler method". In 1926, he was appointed Keeper of the London Museum; there, he oversaw a reorganisation of the collection, successfully lobbied for increased funding, and began lecturing at UCL.

In 1934, he established the Institute of Archaeology as part of the federal University of London, adopting the position of Honorary Director. In this period, he oversaw excavations of the Roman sites at Lydney Park and Verulamium and the Iron Age hill fort of Maiden Castle. During World War II, he re-joined the Armed Forces and rose to the rank of brigadier, serving in the North African Campaign and then the Allied invasion of Italy. In 1944 he was appointed director-general of the Archaeological Survey of India, through which he oversaw excavations of sites at Harappa, Arikamedu, and Brahmagiri, and implemented reforms to the subcontinent's archaeological establishment. Returning to Britain in 1948, he divided his time between lecturing for the Institute of Archaeology and acting as archaeological adviser to Pakistan's government. In later life, his popular books, cruise ship lectures, and appearances on radio and television, particularly the BBC series Animal, Vegetable, Mineral?, helped to bring archaeology to a mass audience. Appointed Honorary Secretary of the British Academy, he raised large sums of money for archaeological projects, and was appointed British representative for several UNESCO projects.

Wheeler is recognised as one of the most important British archaeologists of the 20th century, responsible for successfully encouraging British public interest in the discipline and advancing methodologies of excavation and recording. Furthermore, he is widely acclaimed as a major figure in the establishment of South Asian archaeology. However, many of his specific interpretations of archaeological sites have been discredited or reinterpreted.

== Early life ==
=== Childhood: 1890–1907 ===
Mortimer Wheeler was born on 10 September 1890 in the city of Glasgow, Scotland. He was the first child of the journalist Robert Mortimer Wheeler and his second wife Emily Wheeler (née Baynes). The son of a tea merchant based in Bristol, in youth Robert had considered becoming a Baptist minister, but instead became a staunch freethinker while studying at the University of Edinburgh. Initially working as a lecturer in English literature, Robert turned to journalism after his first wife died in childbirth. His second wife, Emily, shared her husband's interest in English literature, and was the niece of Thomas Spencer Baynes, a Shakespearean scholar at St. Andrews University. Their marriage was emotionally strained, a situation exacerbated by their financial insecurity. Within two years of their son's birth, the family moved to Edinburgh, where a daughter named Amy was born.

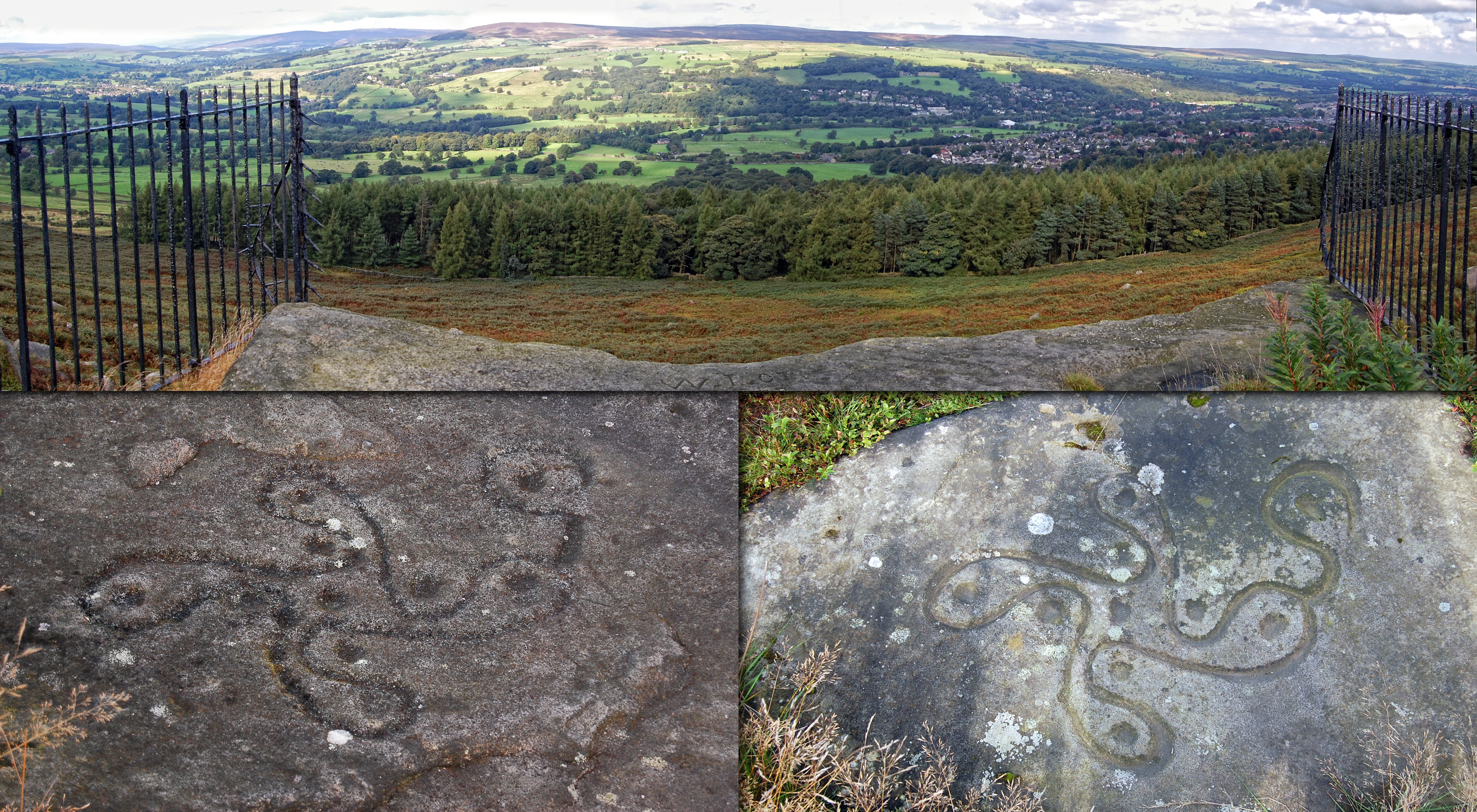
During childhood, Wheeler took an interest in the prehistoric carvings on Ilkley Moor in West Yorkshire.

When Wheeler was four, his father was appointed chief leader writer for the Bradford Observer. The family relocated to Saltaire, a village northwest of Bradford, a cosmopolitan city in Yorkshire, northeast England, then in the midst of the wool trade boom. Wheeler was inspired by the moors surrounding Saltaire and fascinated by the area's archaeology. He later wrote about discovering a late prehistoric cup-marked stone, searching for lithics on Ilkley Moor, and digging into a barrow on Baildon Moor. Although in ill health, Emily Wheeler taught her two children with the help of a maid up to the age of seven or eight. Mortimer remained emotionally distant from his mother, instead being far closer to his father, whose company he favoured over that of other children.

His father had a keen interest in natural history and a love of fishing and shooting, rural pursuits in which he encouraged Mortimer to take part. Robert acquired many books for his son, particularly on the subject of art history, with Wheeler loving to both read and paint.

In 1899, Wheeler joined Bradford Grammar School shortly before his ninth birthday, where he proceeded straight to the second form. In 1902, Robert and Emily had a second daughter, whom they named Betty; Mortimer showed little interest in this younger sister. In 1905, Robert agreed to take over as head of the London office of his newspaper, by then renamed the Yorkshire Daily Observer, so the family relocated to the southeast of the city in December 1905, settling into a house named Carlton Lodge on South Croydon Road, West Dulwich. In 1908, they moved to 14 Rollescourt Avenue in nearby Herne Hill. Rather than being sent for a conventional education, when he was 15 Wheeler was instructed to educate himself by spending time in London, where he frequented the National Gallery and the Victoria and Albert Museum.

=== University and early career: 1907–14 ===
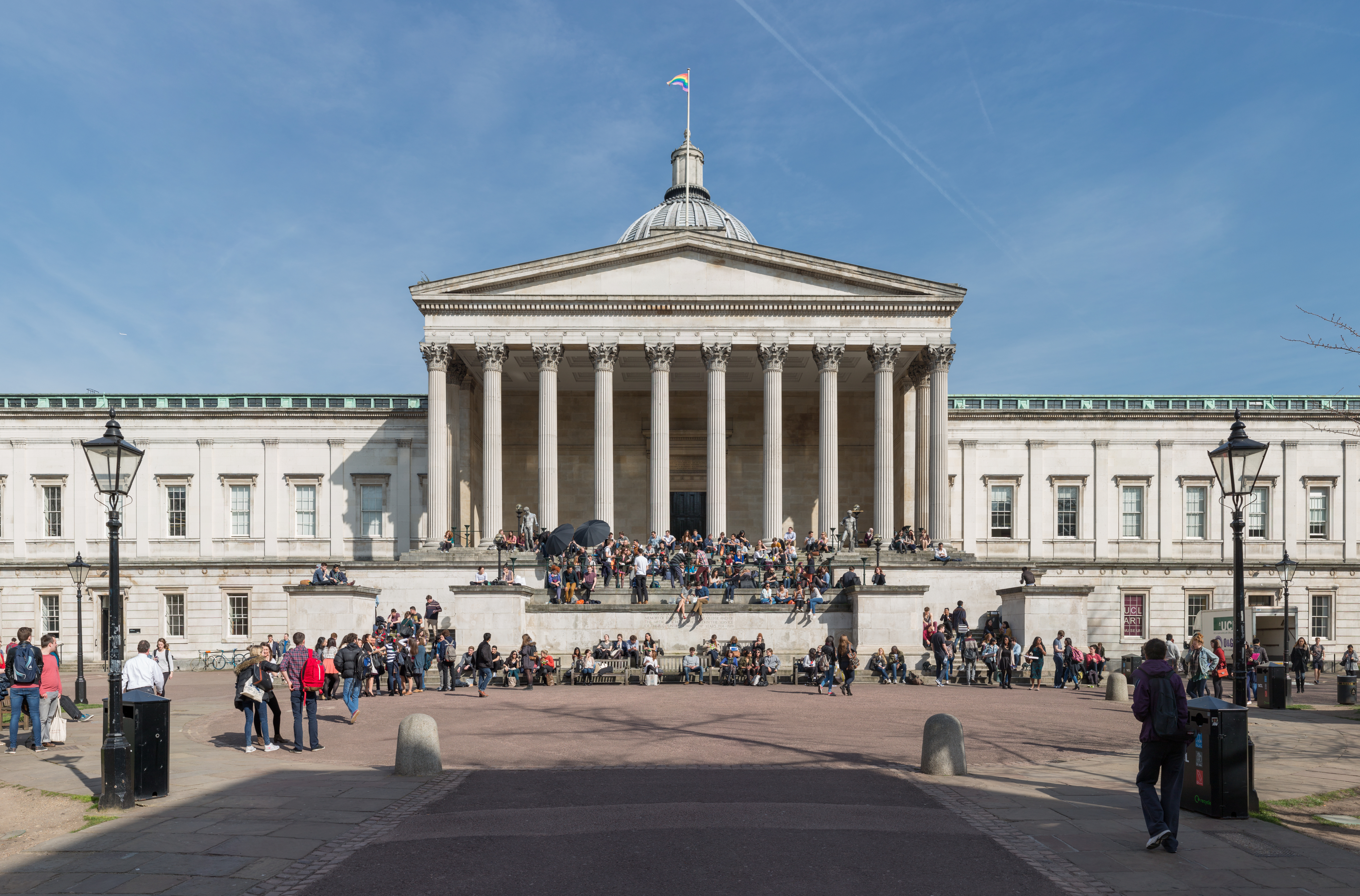
Wheeler undertook his BA and MA at University College London (pictured).

After passing the entrance exam on his second attempt, in 1907 Wheeler was awarded a scholarship to read classical studies at University College London (UCL), commuting daily from his parental home to the university campus in Bloomsbury, central London. At UCL, he was taught by the prominent classicist A. E. Housman. During his undergraduate studies, he became editor of the Union Magazine, for which he produced a number of illustrated cartoons. Increasingly interested in art, he decided to switch from classical studies to a course at UCL's art school, the Slade School of Fine Art; he returned to his previous subject after coming to the opinion that – in his words – he never became more than "a conventionally accomplished picture maker". This interlude had adversely affected his classical studies, and he received a second class BA on graduating.

Wheeler began studying for a Master of Arts degree in classical studies, which he attained in 1912. During this period, he also gained employment as the personal secretary of the UCL Provost Gregory Foster, although he later criticised Foster for transforming the university from "a college in the truly academic sense [into] a hypertrophied monstrosity as little like a college as a plesiosaurus is like a man". It was also at this time of life that he met and began a relationship with Tessa Verney, a student then studying history at UCL, when they were both serving on the committee of the University College Literary Society.

During his studies, Wheeler had developed his love of archaeology, having joined an excavation of Viroconium Cornoviorum, a Romano-British settlement in Wroxeter, in 1913. Considering a profession in the discipline, he won a studentship that had been established jointly by the University of London and the Society of Antiquaries in memory of Augustus Wollaston Franks. The prominent archaeologist Sir Arthur Evans doubled the amount of money that went with the studentship. Wheeler's proposed project had been to analyse Romano-Rhenish pottery, and with the grant he funded a trip to the Rhineland in Germany, there studying the Roman pottery housed in local museums; his research into this subject was never published.

At this period, there were very few jobs available within British archaeology; as the later archaeologist Stuart Piggott related, "the young Wheeler was looking for a professional job where the profession had yet to be created." In 1913 Wheeler secured a position as junior investigator for the English Royal Commission on Historical Monuments, who were embarking on a project to assess the state of all structures in the nation that pre-dated 1714. As part of this, he was first sent to Stebbing in Essex to assess Late Medieval buildings, although once that was accomplished he focused on studying the Romano-British remains of that county. In summer 1914, he married Tessa in a low-key, secular wedding ceremony, before they moved into Wheeler's parental home in Herne Hill.

=== First World War: 1914–1918 ===
"I cannot attempt to describe the conditions under which we are fighting. Anything I could write about them would seem exaggeration but would in reality be miles below the truth. The whole battlefield for miles is a congested mess of sodden, rain-filled shell-holes, which are being added to every moment. The mud is not so much mud as fathomless sticky morass ... If it were not for the cement pill boxes left by the Boche, not a thing could live many hours."

— Wheeler, in a letter to his wife, October 1917

After the United Kingdom's entry into World War I in 1914, Wheeler volunteered for the armed forces. Although preferring solitary to group activities, Wheeler found that he greatly enjoyed soldiering, and on 9 November 1914 was commissioned a temporary second lieutenant in the University of London Officer Training Corps, serving with its artillery unit as an instructor. It was during this period, in January 1915, that a son was born to the Wheelers, and named Michael. Michael Wheeler was their only child, something that was a social anomaly at the time, although it is unknown whether or not this was by choice. In May 1915, Wheeler transferred to the 1st Lowland Brigade of the Royal Field Artillery (Territorial Force), and was confirmed in his rank on 1 July, with a promotion to temporary lieutenant from the same date. Shortly thereafter, on 16 July, Wheeler was promoted to temporary captain. In this position he was stationed at various bases across Britain, often bringing his wife and child with him; his responsibility was as a battery commander, initially of field guns and later of howitzers.

In October 1917 Wheeler was posted to the 76th Army Field Artillery Brigade, one of the Royal Field Artillery brigades under the direct control of the general officer commanding, Third Army. The brigade was then stationed in Belgium, where it had been engaged in the Battle of Passchendaele against German troops along the Western Front. By now a substantive lieutenant (temporary captain), on 7 October he was appointed second-in-command of an artillery battery with the acting rank of captain, but on 21 October became commander of a battery with the acting rank of major, replacing a major who had been poisoned by mustard gas. He was part of the Left Group of artillery covering the advancing Allied infantry in the battle. Throughout, he maintained correspondences with his wife, his sister Amy, and his parents. After the Allied victory in the battle, the brigade was transferred to Italy.

Wheeler and the brigade arrived in Italy on 20 November, and proceeded through the Italian Riviera to reach Caporetto, where it had been sent to bolster the Italian troops against a German and Austro-Hungarian advance. As the Russian Republic removed itself from the war, the German Army refocused its efforts on the Western Front, so in March 1918 Wheeler's brigade was ordered to leave Italy, getting a train from Castelfranco to Vieux Rouen in France. Back on the Western Front, the brigade was assigned to the 2nd Division, again part of Julian Byng's Third Army, reaching a stable area of the front in April. Here, Wheeler was engaged in artillery fire for several months, before the British went on the offensive in August. On 24 August, between the ruined villages of Achiet and Sapignies, he led an expedition that captured two German field guns while under heavy fire from a castle mound; he was later awarded the Military Cross for this action:

For conspicuous gallantry and initiative. While making a reconnaissance he saw two enemy field guns limbered up without horses within 300 yards of the outpost line. He returned for two six-horse teams, and under heavy fire, in full view of the enemy, successfully brought back both guns to his battery position and turned them on the enemy. He did fine work.

Wheeler continued as part of the British forces pushing westward until the German surrender in November 1918, receiving a mention in dispatches on 8 November. He was not demobilised for several months, instead being stationed at Pulheim in Germany until March; during this time he wrote up his earlier research on Romano-Rhenish pottery, making use of access to local museums, before returning to London in July 1919. Reverting to his permanent rank of lieutenant on 16 September, Wheeler was finally discharged from service on 30 September 1921, retaining the rank of major.

== Career ==
=== National Museum of Wales: 1919–1926 ===
On returning to London, Wheeler moved into a top-floor flat near Gordon Square with his wife and child. He returned to working for the Royal Commission, examining and cataloguing the historic structures of Essex. In doing so, he produced his first publication, an academic paper on Colchester's Roman Balkerne Gate which was published in the Transactions of the Essex Archaeological Society in 1920. He soon followed this with two papers in the Journal of Roman Studies; the first offered a wider analysis of Roman Colchester, while the latter outlined his discovery of the vaulting for the city's Temple of Claudius which was destroyed by Boudica's revolt. In doing so, he developed a reputation as a Roman archaeologist in Britain. He then submitted his research on Romano-Rhenish pots to the University of London, on the basis of which he was awarded his Doctorate of Letters; thenceforth until his knighthood he styled himself as Dr Wheeler. He was unsatisfied with his job in the commission, unhappy that he was receiving less pay and a lower status than he had had in the army, so began to seek alternative employment.

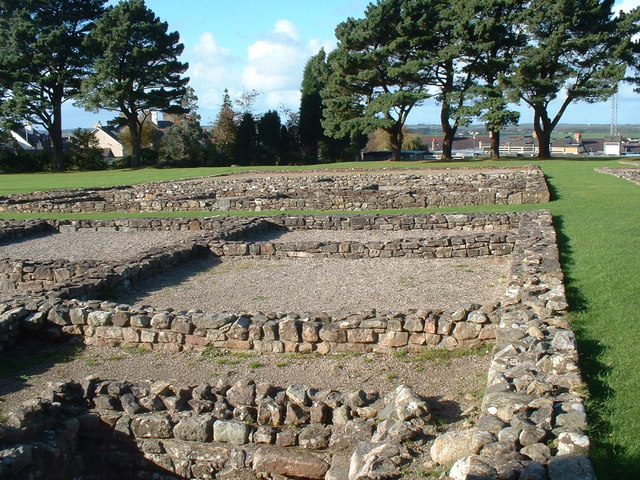
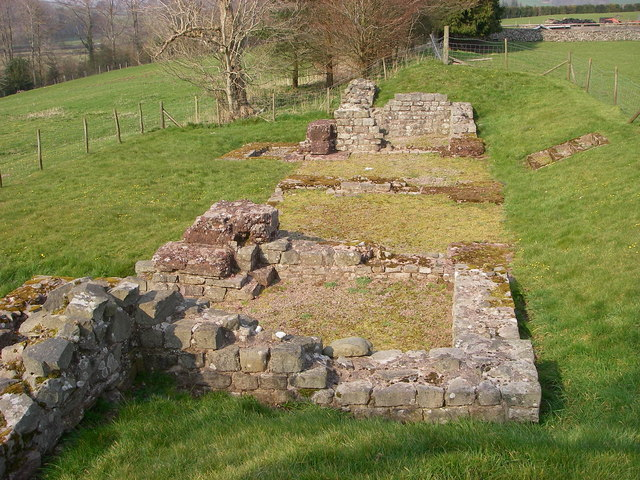
While Keeper of Antiquities, Wheeler oversaw excavation of the Roman forts at Segontium (left) and Y Gaer (right) in Wales.

He obtained a post as the Keeper of Archaeology at the National Museum of Wales, a job that also entailed becoming a lecturer in archaeology at the University College of South Wales and Monmouthshire. Taking up this position, he moved to Cardiff with his family in August 1920, although he initially disliked the city. The museum was in disarray; before the war, construction had begun on a new purpose-built building to house the collections. This had ceased during the conflict and the edifice was left abandoned during Cardiff's post-war economic slump. Wheeler recognised that Wales was very divided regionally, with many Welsh people having little loyalty to Cardiff; thus, he made a point of touring the country, lecturing to local societies about archaeology. According to the later archaeologist Lydia C. Carr, the Wheelers' work for the cause of the museum was part of a wider "cultural-nationalist movement" linked to growing Welsh nationalism during this period; for instance, the Welsh nationalist party Plaid Cymru was founded in 1925.

Wheeler was impatient to start excavations, and in July 1921 started a six-week project to excavate at the Roman fort of Segontium; accompanied by his wife, he used up his holiday to oversee the project. A second season of excavation at the site followed in 1922. Greatly influenced by the writings of the archaeologist Augustus Pitt-Rivers, Wheeler emphasised the need for a strong, developed methodology when undertaking an archaeological excavation, believing in the need for strategic planning, or what he termed "controlled discovery", with clear objectives in mind for a project. Further emphasising the importance of prompt publication of research results, he wrote full seasonal reports for Archaeologia Cambrensis before publishing a full report, Segontium and the Roman Occupation of Wales. Wheeler was keen on training new generations of archaeologists, and two of the most prominent students to excavate with him at Segontium were Victor Nash-Williams and Ian Richmond.

Over the field seasons of 1924 and 1925, Wheeler ran excavations of the Roman fort of Y Gaer near Brecon, a project aided by his wife and two archaeological students, Nowell Myres and Christopher Hawkes. During this project, he was visited by the prominent Egyptologist Sir Flinders Petrie and his wife Hilda Petrie; Wheeler greatly admired Petrie's emphasis on strong archaeological methodologies. Wheeler published the results of his excavation in The Roman Fort Near Brecon. He then began excavations at Isca Augusta, a Roman site in Caerleon, where he focused on revealing the Roman amphitheatre. Intent on attracting press attention to both raise public awareness of archaeology and attract new sources of funding, he contacted the press and organised a sponsorship of the excavation by the middle-market newspaper the Daily Mail. In doing so, he emphasised the folkloric and legendary associations that the site had with King Arthur. In 1925, Oxford University Press published Wheeler's first book for a general audience, Prehistoric and Roman Wales; he later expressed the opinion that it was not a good book.

In 1924, the director of the National Museum of Wales, William Evans Hoyle, resigned amid ill health. Wheeler applied to take on the role of his replacement, providing supportive testimonials from Charles Reed Peers, Robert Bosanquet, and H. J. Fleure. Although he had no prior museum experience, he was successful in his application and was appointed director. He then employed a close friend, Cyril Fox, to take on the vacated position of Keeper of Archaeology. Wheeler's proposed reforms included extending the institution's reach and influence throughout Wales by building affiliations with regional museums, and focusing on fundraising to finance the completion of the new museum premises. He obtained a £21,367 donation from the wealthy shipowner William Reardon Smith and appointed Smith to be the museum's treasurer, and also travelled to Whitehall, London, where he successfully urged the British Treasury to provide further funding for the museum. As a result, construction on the museum's new building was able to continue, and it was officially opened by King George V in 1927.

=== London Museum: 1926–1933 ===
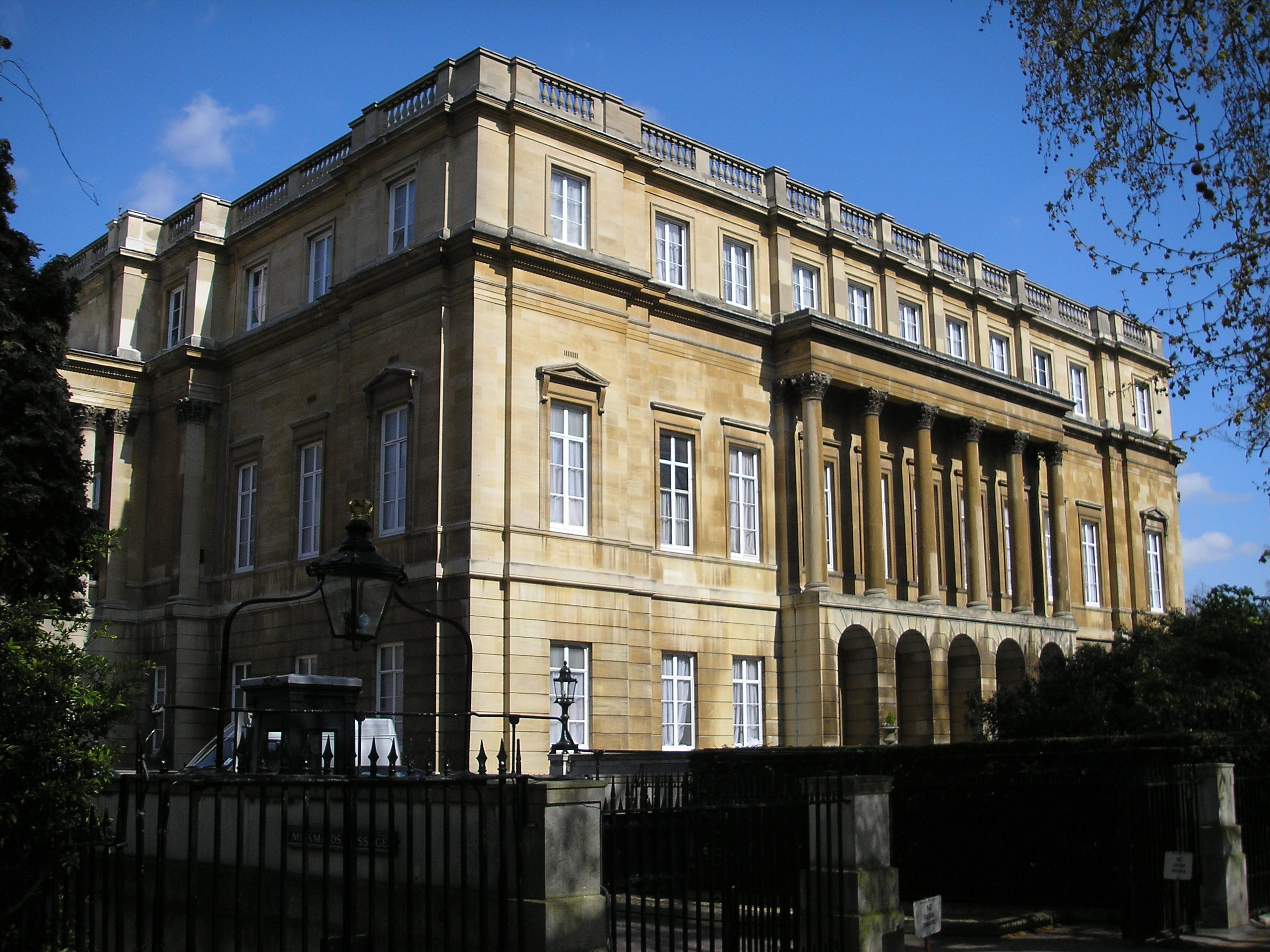
Lancaster House, where the London Museum was based

Upon the retirement of the Keeper of the London Museum, Harmon Oates, Wheeler was invited to fill the vacancy. He had been considering a return to London for some time and eagerly agreed, taking on the post, which was based at Lancaster House in the St James's area, in July 1926. In Wales, many felt that Wheeler had simply taken the directorship of the National Museum to advance his own career prospects, and that he had abandoned them when a better offer came along. Wheeler himself disagreed, believing that he had left Fox at the Museum as his obvious successor, and that the reforms he had implemented would therefore continue. The position initially provided Wheeler with an annual salary of £600, which resulted in a decline in living standards for his family, who moved into a flat near Victoria Station.

Tessa's biographer L. C. Carr later commented that together, the Wheelers "professionalized the London Museum". Wheeler expressed his opinion that the museum "had to be cleaned, expurgated, and catalogued; in general, turned from a junk shop into a tolerably rational institution". Focusing on reorganising the exhibits and developing a more efficient method of cataloguing the artefacts, he also wrote A Short Guide to the Collections, before using the items in the museum to write three books: London and the Vikings, London and the Saxons, and London and the Romans. Upon his arrival, the Treasury allocated the museum an annual budget of £5,000, which Wheeler deemed insufficient for its needs. In 1930, Wheeler persuaded them to increase that budget, as he highlighted increasing visitor numbers, publications, and acquisitions, as well as a rise in the number of educational projects. With this additional funding, he was able to employ more staff and increase his own annual salary to £900.

Soon after joining the museum, Wheeler was elected to the council of the Society of Antiquaries. Through the society, he became involved in the debate as to who should finance archaeological supervision of building projects in Greater London; his argument was that the City of London Corporation should provide the funding, although in 1926 it was agreed that the society itself would employ a director of excavation based in Lancaster House to take on the position. Also involved in the largely moribund Royal Archaeological Institute, Wheeler organised its relocation to Lancaster House. In 1927, Wheeler took on an unpaid lectureship at University College London, where he established a graduate diploma course on archaeology; one of the first to enroll was Stuart Piggott. In 1928, Wheeler curated an exhibit at UCL on "Recent Work in British Archaeology", for which he attracted much press attention.

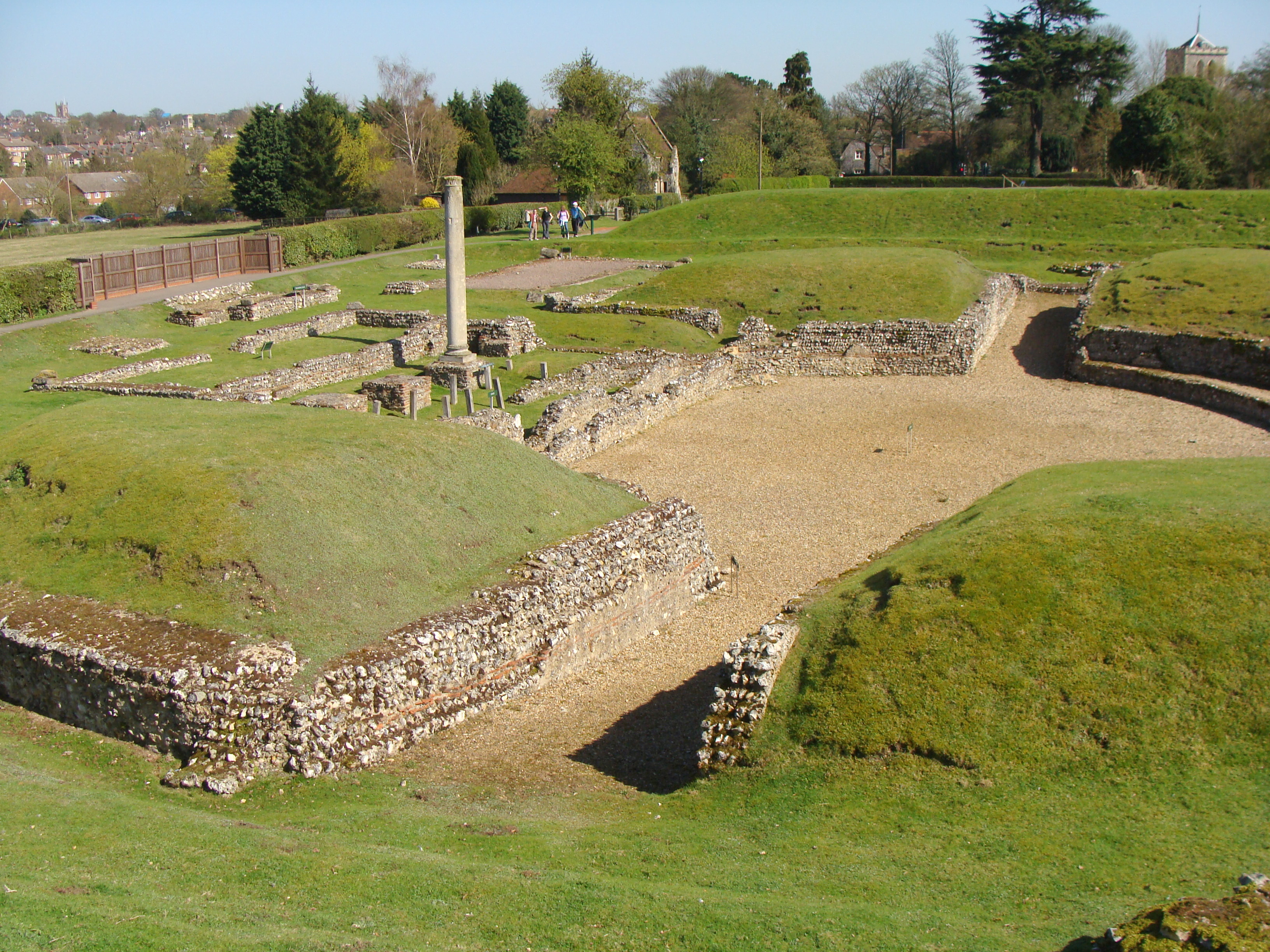
Wheeler excavated at Verulamium, later to become St Albans; the remains of the city's Roman theatre are shown.

Wheeler was keen to continue archaeological fieldwork outside London, undertaking excavations every year from 1926 to 1939. After completing his excavation of the Carlaeon amphitheatre in 1928, he began fieldwork at the Roman settlement and temple in Lydney Park, Gloucestershire, having been invited to do so by the aristocratic landowner, Charles Bathurst. It was during these investigations that Wheeler personally discovered the Lydney Hoard of coinage. Wheeler and his wife jointly published their excavation report in 1932 as Report on the Excavation of the Prehistoric, Roman and Post-Roman Site in Lydney Park, Gloucestershire, which Piggott noted had "set the pattern" for all Wheeler's future excavation reports.

From there, Wheeler was invited to direct a Society of Antiquaries excavation at the Roman settlement of Verulamium, which existed on land recently acquired by the Corporation of St Albans. He took on this role for four seasons from 1930 to 1933, before leaving a fifth season of excavation under the control of the archaeologist Kathleen Kenyon and the architect A. W. G. Lowther. Wheeler enjoyed the opportunity to excavate at a civilian as opposed to military site, and also liked its proximity to his home in London. He was particularly interested in searching for a pre-Roman Iron Age oppidum at the site, noting that the existence of a nearby Catuvellauni settlement was attested to in both classical texts and numismatic evidence. With Wheeler focusing his attention on potential Iron Age evidence, Tessa concentrated on excavating the inside of the city walls; Wheeler had affairs with at least three assistants during the project. After Tessa wrote two interim reports, the final excavation report was finally published in 1936 as Verulamium: A Belgic and Two Roman Cities, jointly written by Wheeler and his wife. The report resulted in the first major published criticism of Wheeler, produced by the young archaeologist Nowell Myres in a review for Antiquity; although stating that there was much to praise about the work, he critiqued Wheeler's selective excavation, dubious dating, and guesswork. Wheeler responded with a piece in which he defended his work and launched a personal attack on both Myres and Myres's employer, Christ Church, Oxford.

=== Institute of Archaeology: 1934–1939 ===
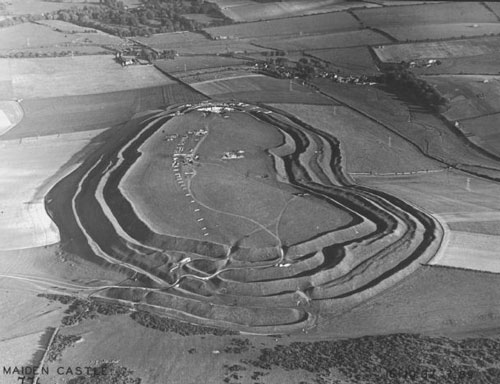
Wheeler led excavations at the Iron Age hill fort of Maiden Castle in Dorset. Photograph by Major George Allen, October 1937.

Wheeler had long desired to establish an academic institution devoted to archaeology that could be based in London. He hoped that it could become a centre in which to establish the professionalisation of archaeology as a discipline, with systematic training of students in methodological techniques of excavation and conservation and recognised professional standards; in his words, he hoped "to convert archaeology into a discipline worthy of that name in all senses". He further described his intention that the institute should become "a laboratory: a laboratory of archaeological science". Many archaeologists shared his hopes, and to this end Petrie had donated much of his collection of Near Eastern artefacts to Wheeler, in the hope that it would be included in such an institution.

Wheeler was later able to persuade the University of London, a federation of institutions across the capital, to support the venture, and both he and Tessa began raising funds from wealthy backers. In 1934, the Institute of Archaeology was officially opened, albeit at this point without premises or academic staff; the first students to enroll were Rachel Clay and Barbara Parker, who went on to have careers in the discipline.

While Wheeler – who was still Keeper of the London Museum – took on the role of Honorary Director of the institute, he installed the archaeologist Kathleen Kenyon as secretary of the Management Committee, describing her as "a level-headed person, with useful experience". That June, he was appointed an Officer of the Order of Saint John (OStJ).

After ending his work at Verulamium, Wheeler turned his attention to the late Iron Age hill-fort of Maiden Castle near Dorchester, Dorset, where he excavated for four seasons from 1934 to 1937. Co-directed by Mortimer and Tessa Wheeler, and the Curator of Dorset County Museum (Charles Drew), the project was carried out under the joint auspices of the Society of Antiquaries and the Dorset Field Club. With around 100 assistants each season, the dig constituted the largest excavation that had been conducted in Britain up to that point, with Wheeler organising weekly meetings with the press to inform them about any discoveries. According to later historian Adam Stout, the Maiden Castle excavation was "one of the most famous British archaeological investigations of the twentieth century. It was the classic 'Wheeler dig', both in terms of scale of operations and the publicity which it generated."

Wheeler's excavation report was published in 1943 as Maiden Castle, Dorset. The report's publication allowed further criticism to be voiced of Wheeler's approach and interpretations; in his review of the book, the archaeologist W. F. Grimes criticised the highly selective nature of the excavation, noting that Wheeler had not asked questions regarding the socio-economic issues of the community at Maiden Castle, aspects of past societies that had come to be of increasing interest to British archaeology. Over coming decades, as further excavations were carried out at the site and archaeologists developed a greater knowledge of Iron Age Britain, much of Wheeler's interpretation of the site and its development was shown to be wrong, in particular by the work of the archaeologist Niall Sharples.

In 1936, Wheeler embarked on a visit to the Near East, sailing from Marseille to Port Said, where he visited the Old Kingdom tombs of Sakkara. From there he went via Sinai to Palestine, Lebanon, and Syria. During this trip, he visited various archaeological projects, but was dismayed by the quality of their excavations; in particular, he noted that the American-run excavation at Tel Megiddo was adopting standards that had been rejected in Britain twenty-five years previously. He was away for six weeks, and upon his return to Europe discovered that his wife Tessa had died of a pulmonary embolism after a minor operation on her toe. According to Tessa's biographer, for Wheeler this discovery was "the peak of mental misery, and marked the end of his ability to feel a certain kind of love". That winter, his father also died. By the summer of 1937, he had embarked on a new romance, with a young woman named Mavis de Vere Cole, widow of Horace de Vere Cole, who had first met Wheeler when visiting the Maiden Castle excavations with her then-lover, the painter Augustus John. After she eventually agreed to his repeated proposals, the two were married early in 1939 in a ceremony held at Caxton Hall, with a reception at Shelley House. They proceeded on a honeymoon to the Middle East.

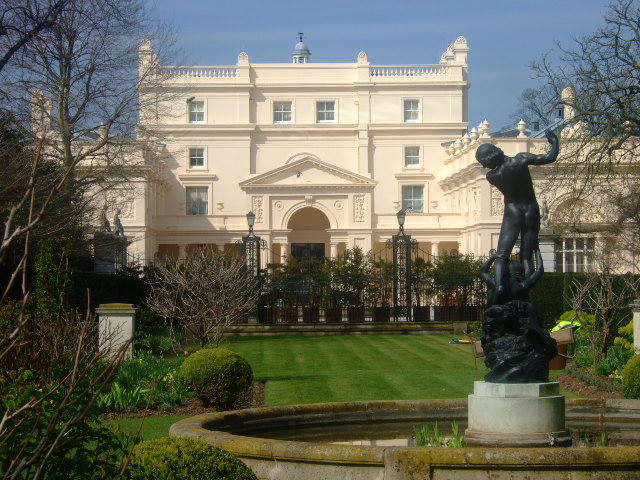
St. John's Lodge in Regent's Park, the first building to house the Institute of Archaeology

After a search that had taken several years, Wheeler was able to secure premises for the Institute of Archaeology: St. John's Lodge in Regent's Park, central London. Left empty since its use as a hospital during the First World War, the building was owned by the Crown and was controlled by the First Commissioner of Works, William Ormsby-Gore; he was very sympathetic to archaeology, and leased the building to the Institute at a low rent. The St. John's Lodge premises were officially opened on 29 April 1937. During his speech at the ceremony, the University of London's vice-chancellor Charles Reed Peers made it clear that the building was only intended as a temporary home for the institute, which it was hoped would be able to move to Bloomsbury, the city's academic hub. In his speech, the university's chancellor, Alexander Cambridge, 1st Earl of Athlone, compared the new institution to both the Institute of Historical Research and the Courtauld Institute of Art.

Wheeler had also become president of the Museums Association, and in a presidential address given in Belfast talked on the topic of preserving museum collections in wartime, believing that Britain's involvement in a second European conflict was imminent. In anticipation of this event, in August 1939 he arranged for the London Museum to place many of its most important collections into safe keeping. He was also awarded an honorary doctorate from Bristol University, and at the award ceremony met the Conservative Party politician Winston Churchill, who was then engaged in writing his multi-volume A History of the English-Speaking Peoples; Churchill asked Wheeler to help him in writing about late prehistoric and early medieval Britain, to which Wheeler agreed.

After Maiden Castle, Wheeler turned his attention to France, where the archaeological investigation of Iron Age sites had lagged behind developments in Britain. There, he oversaw a series of surveys and excavations with the aid of Leslie Scott, beginning with a survey tour of Brittany in the winter of 1936–37. After this, Wheeler decided to excavate the oppidum at Camp d'Artus, near Huelgoat, Finistère. In addition to bringing many British archaeologists to work on the site, he hired six local Breton workmen to assist the project, coming to the belief that the oppidum had been erected by local Iron Age tribes to defend themselves from the Roman invasion led by Julius Caesar. Meanwhile, Scott had been placed in charge of an excavation at the smaller nearby hill fort of Kercaradec, near Quimper. In July 1939, the project focused its attention on Normandy, with excavations beginning at the Iron Age hill forts of Camp de Canada and Duclair. They were brought to an abrupt halt in September 1939 as the Second World War broke out in Europe, and the team evacuated back to Britain. Wheeler's excavation report, co-written with Katherine Richardson, was eventually published as Hill-forts of Northern France in 1957.

=== Second World War: 1939–1945 ===
Wheeler had been expecting and openly hoping for war with Nazi Germany for a year before the outbreak of hostilities; he believed that the United Kingdom's involvement in the conflict would remedy the shame that he thought had been brought upon the country by its signing of the Munich Agreement in September 1938. Volunteering for the armed services, on 18 July 1939 he returned to active service as a major (Special List). He was assigned to assemble the 48th Light Anti-Aircraft Battery at Enfield, where he set about recruiting volunteers, including his son Michael. As the 48th swelled in size, it was converted into the 42nd Mobile Light Anti-Aircraft Regiment in the Royal Artillery, which consisted of four batteries and was led by Wheeler – now promoted to the temporary rank of lieutenant-colonel (effective 27 January 1940) – as commanding officer. Given the nickname of "Flash Alf" by those serving under him, he was recognised by colleagues as a ruthless disciplinarian and was blamed by many for the death of one of his soldiers from influenza during training. Having been appointed secretary of the Society of Antiquaries in 1939 and then director in 1940, he travelled to London to deal with society affairs on various occasions. In 1941 Wheeler was awarded a Fellowship of the British Academy. Mavis de Vere Cole – Wheeler's wife, had meanwhile entered into an affair with a man named Clive Entwistle, who lambasted Wheeler as "that whiskered baboon". When Wheeler discovered Entwistle in bed with her, he initiated divorce proceedings that were finalised in March 1942.

In the summer of 1941, Wheeler and three of his batteries were assigned to fight against German and Italian forces in the North African Campaign. In September, they set sail from Glasgow aboard the RMS Empress of Russia; because the Mediterranean was controlled largely by enemy naval forces, they were forced to travel via the Cape of Good Hope, before taking shore leave in Durban. There, Wheeler visited the local kraals to compare them with the settlements of Iron Age Britain. The ship docked in Aden, where Wheeler and his men again took shore leave. They soon reached the British-controlled Suez, where they disembarked and were stationed on the shores of the Great Bitter Lake. There, Wheeler took a brief leave of absence to travel to Jerusalem, where he visited Petrie on his hospital deathbed. Back in Egypt, he gained permission to fly as a front gunner in a Wellington bomber on a bombing raid against Axis forces, to better understand what it was like for aircrew to be fired on by an anti-aircraft battery.

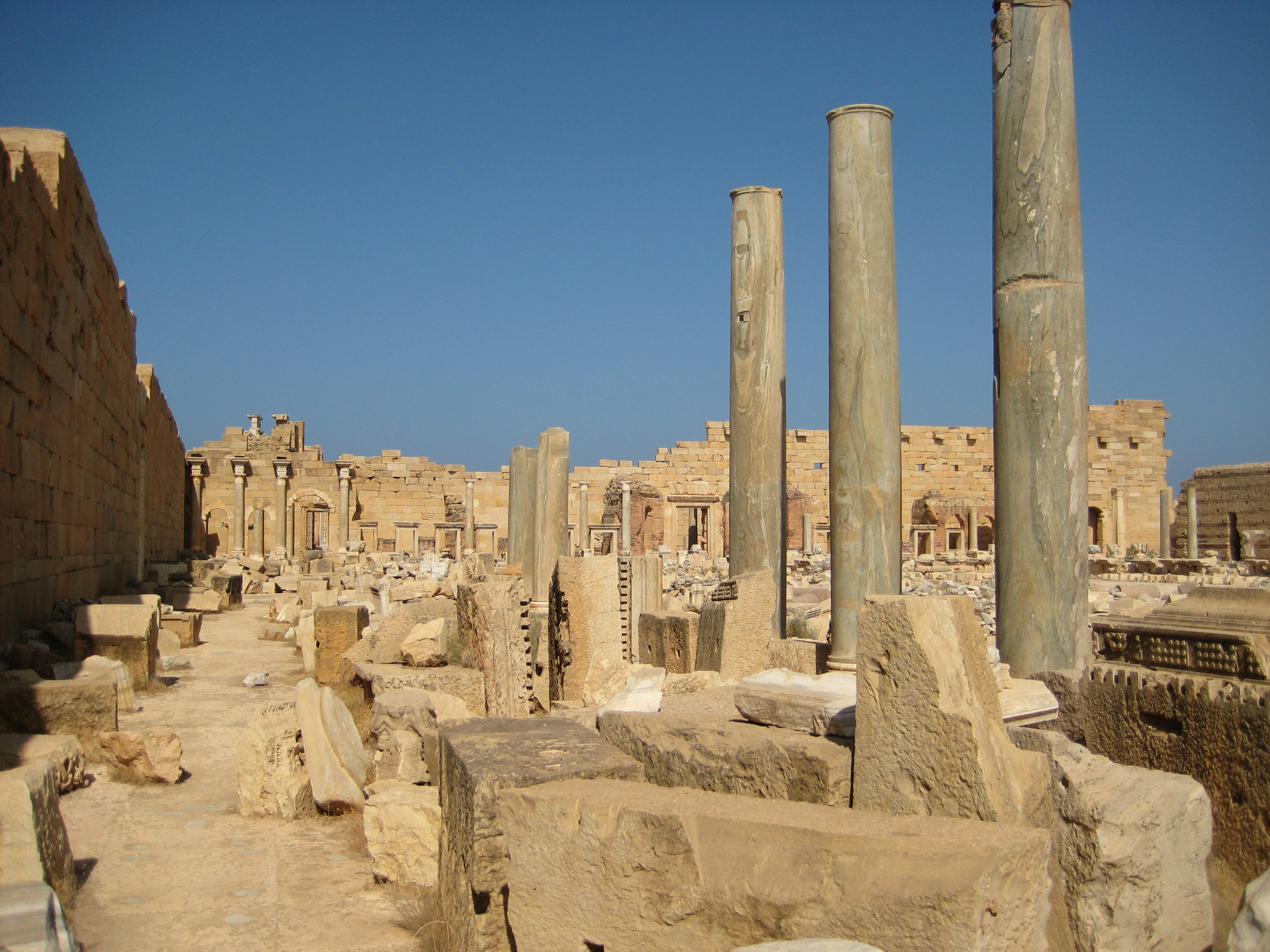
In North Africa, Wheeler sought to preserve archaeological remains, such as those of Leptis Magna (pictured), from being damaged by occupying troops.

Serving with the Eighth Army, Wheeler was present in North Africa when the Axis armies pushed the Allies back to El Alamein. He was also part of the Allied counter-push, taking part in the Second Battle of El Alamein and the advance on Axis-held Tripoli. On the way he became concerned that the archaeological sites of North Africa were being threatened both by the fighting and the occupying forces. After the British secured control of Libya, Wheeler visited Tripoli and Leptis Magna, where he found that Roman remains had been damaged and vandalised by British troops; he brought about reforms to prevent this, lecturing to the troops on the importance of preserving archaeology, making many monuments out-of-bounds, and ensuring that the Royal Air Force changed its plans to construct a radar station in the midst of a Roman settlement. Aware that the British were planning to invade and occupy the Italian island of Sicily, he insisted that measures be introduced to preserve the historic and archaeological monuments on the island.

Promoted to the acting rank of brigadier on 1 May 1943, after the German surrender in North Africa, Wheeler was sent to Algiers where he was part of the staff committee planning the invasion of Italy. There, he learned that the India Office had requested that the army relieve him of his duties to permit him to be appointed director general of archaeology in India. Although he had never been to the country, he agreed that he would take the job on the condition that he be permitted to take part in the invasion of Italy first. As intended, Wheeler and his 12th Anti-Aircraft Brigade then took part in the invasion of Sicily and then mainland Italy, where they were ordered to use their anti-aircraft guns to protect the British 10th Corps. As the Allies advanced north through Italy, Wheeler spent time in Naples and then Capri, where he met various aristocrats who had anti-fascist sympathies.

Wheeler left Italy in November 1943 and returned to London. There, he resigned as the director of the London Museum and focused on organising the Institute of Archaeology, preparing it for its adoption of a new director, V. Gordon Childe, after the war. He also resigned as director of the Society of Antiquaries, but was appointed the group's representative to the newly formed Council for British Archaeology. He developed a relationship with a woman named Kim Collingridge, and asked her to marry him. As she was a devout Roman Catholic, he officially converted to the religion, something which shocked many of his friends, who believed that he was being dishonest because he did not genuinely believe in the doctrines of the faith. He then set sail for Bombay aboard a transport ship, the City of Exeter, in February 1944.

=== Archaeological Survey of India: 1944–1948 ===
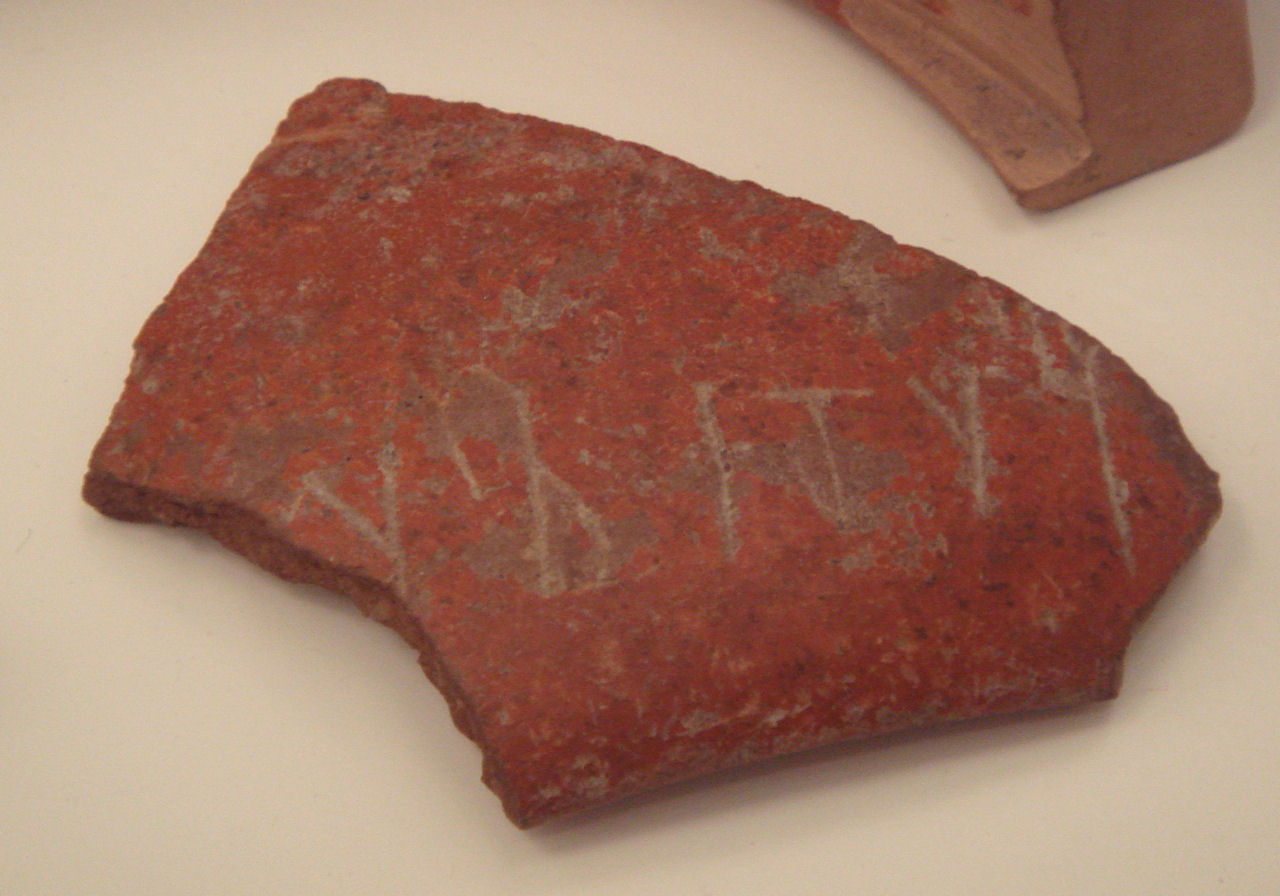
It was Wheeler who discovered evidence for Roman trade links at Arikamedu in southern India, as evidenced by ceramics such as this.

Wheeler arrived in Bombay in the spring of 1944. There, he was welcomed by the governor of the Bombay Presidency, John Colville, before heading by train to Delhi and then Shimla, where the headquarters of the Archaeological Survey of India were located. Wheeler had been suggested for the job by Archibald Wavell, the Viceroy of India, who had been acting on the recommendations of the archaeologist Leonard Woolley, who had written a report lamenting the state of the archaeological establishment in the British-controlled subcontinent. Wheeler recognised this state of affairs, in a letter to a friend complaining about the lack of finances and equipment, commenting that "We're back in 1850". He initially found much to dislike in India, and in his letters to friends in Britain expressed derogatory and racist sentiments toward Indians: he stated that "they feed wrongly and think wrongly and live wrongly ... I already find myself regarding them as ill-made clockwork toys rather than as human beings, and I find myself bullying them most brutally." He expelled those staff members whom he deemed too idle, and physically beat others in an attempt to motivate them.

From the beginning of his tenure, he sought to distance himself from previous directors-general and their administrations by criticising them in print and attempting to introduce new staff who had no loyalty to his predecessors. Assigned a four-year contract, Wheeler attempted to recruit two archaeologists from Britain, Glyn Daniel and Stuart Piggott, to aid him in reforming the Archaeological Survey, although they declined the offer. He then toured the subcontinent, seeking to meet all of the Survey's staff members. He had drawn up a prospectus containing research questions that he wanted the Survey to focus on; these included understanding the period between the Bronze Age Indus Valley civilization and the Achaemenid Empire, discerning the socio-cultural background to the Vedas, dating the Aryan migration, and establishing a dating system for southern India before the 6th century CE. During his time in office he also achieved a 25 per cent budget increase for the Archaeological Survey, and convinced the government to agree to the construction of a National Museum of Archaeology, to be built in New Delhi.

In October 1944, he opened his six-month archaeological field school in Taxila, where he instructed various students from across India in the methodologies of the discipline. Wheeler became very fond of his students, with one of them, B. B. Lal, later commenting that "behind the gruff exterior, Sir Mortimer had a very kind and sympathetic heart". Throughout his period in India, his students were some of the only individuals to whom Wheeler warmed; more widely, he was annoyed by what he saw as the idleness, incompetence and corruption of Indian society. Initially focusing on the northwest of the subcontinent, Wheeler was particularly fascinated by the Bronze Age Indus Valley Civilization. On his initial inspection of the Indus Valley sites of Mohenjo-daro and Harappa, he organised a very brief excavation which revealed fortifications around both settlements. He later led a more detailed excavation at Harappa, where he exposed further fortifications and established a stratigraphy for the settlement.

Turning his attention to southern India, Wheeler discovered remnants of a Roman amphora in a museum, and began excavations at Arikamedu, revealing a port from the 1st century CE that had traded in goods from the Roman Empire. The excavation had been plagued by severe rains and tropical heat, although it was during the excavation that World War II ended; in celebration, Wheeler gave all his workers an extra rupee for the day. It has since been alleged that while Wheeler took credit for discovering the significance of this site, it had previously been established by A. Aiyappan, the Superintendent of the Government Museum in Madras, and the French archaeologist Jouveau Dubreuil, with Wheeler intentionally ignoring their contribution. He later undertook excavations of six megalithic tombs in Brahmagiri, Mysore, which enabled him to gain a chronology for the archaeology of much of southern India.

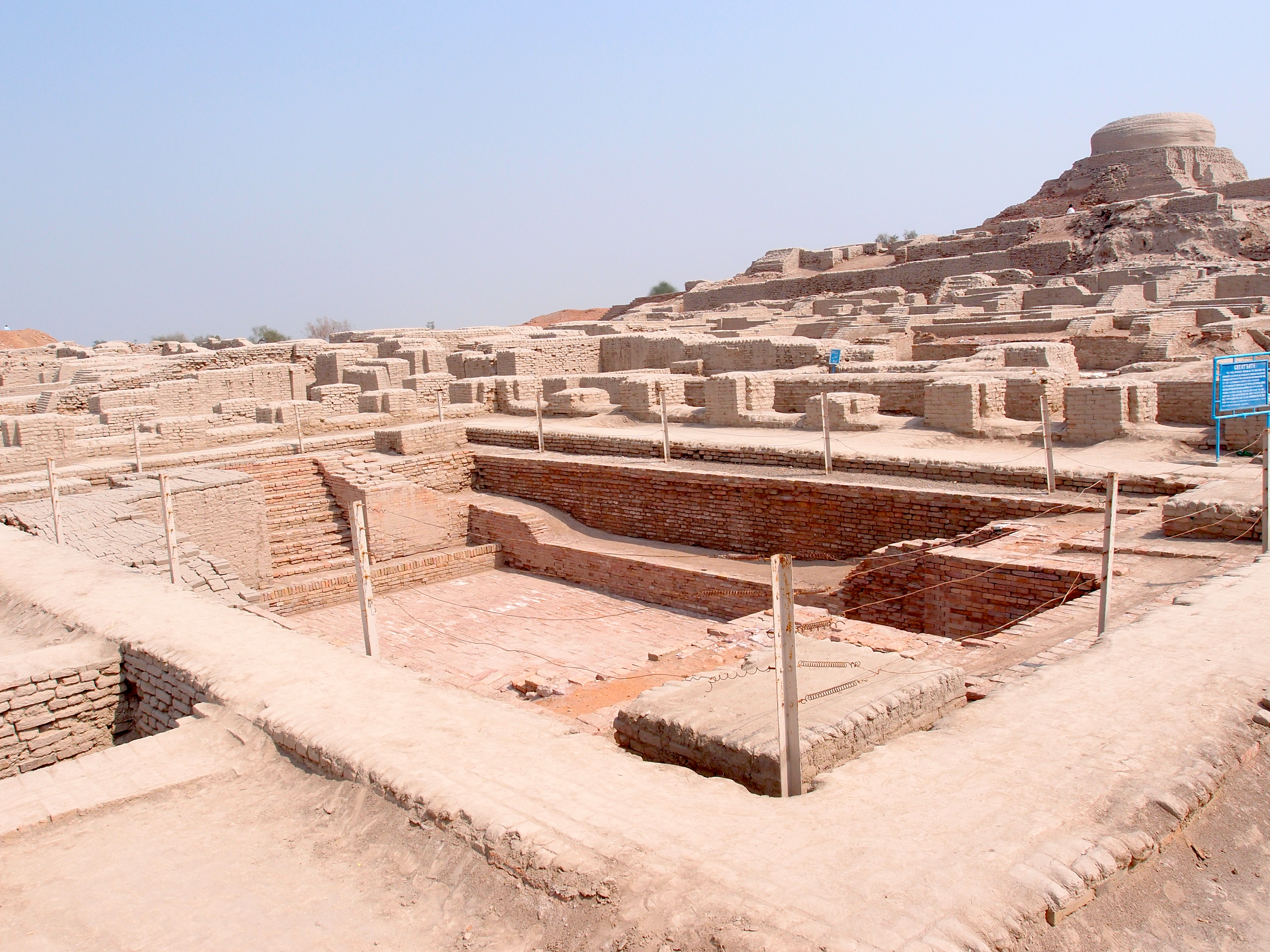
Wheeler was fascinated by the Indus Valley civilisation, and excavated at Mohenjo-daro.

Wheeler established a new archaeological journal, Ancient India, planning for it to be published twice a year. He had trouble securing printing paper and faced various delays; the first issue was released in January 1946, and he would release three further volumes during his stay. Wheeler married Kim Collingridge in Simla, before he and his wife took part in an Indian Cultural Mission to Iran. The Indian government had deemed Wheeler ideal to lead the group, which departed via train to Zahidan before visiting Persepolis, Tehran, Isfahan, Shiraz, Pasargadae, and Kashan. Wheeler enjoyed the trip, and was envious of Tehran's archaeological museum and library, which was far in advance of anything then found in India. Crossing into Iraq, in Baghdad the team caught a flight back to Delhi. In 1946, he was involved in a second cultural mission, this time to Afghanistan, where he expressed a particular interest in the kingdom of ancient Bactria and visited the archaeology of Balkh.

Wheeler was present during the 1947 Partition of India into the Dominion of Pakistan and the Union of India and the accompanying ethnic violence between Hindu and Muslim communities. He was unhappy with how these events had affected the Archaeological Survey, complaining that some of his finest students and staff were now citizens of Pakistan and no longer able to work for him. He was based in New Delhi when the city was rocked by sectarian violence, and attempted to help many of his Muslim staff members escape from the Hindu-majority city unharmed. He further helped smuggle Muslim families out of the city hospital, where they had taken refuge from a violent Hindu mob. As India neared independence from the British Empire, the political situation had changed significantly; by October 1947 he was one of the last British individuals in a senior position in the country's governing establishment, and recognised that many Indian nationalists wanted him to leave as well. For his work in India, Wheeler was appointed a Companion of the Order of the Indian Empire (CIE) in the final imperial honours list issued the day before Indian independence (gazetted in the 1948 New Year Honours).

As their relationship had become increasingly strained, his wife had left and returned to Britain. Although hoping to leave his post in India several months early, he was concerned for his economic prospects, and desperately searched for a new position. Through friends in the British archaeological community, he was offered a job as the secretary of the Royal Commission on the Ancient and Historical Monuments of Wales, although he was upset that this would mean a drop in his professional status and income and decided to turn it down. Instead, he agreed to take up a chair in the Archaeology of the Roman Provinces at the Institute of Archaeology. In addition, the Pakistani Minister of Education invited him to become the Archaeological Adviser to the Pakistani government; he agreed also to take up this position, on the condition that he would only spend several months in the country each year over the next three. On 1 September 1948, having exceeded the age limit, he relinquished his Territorial Army commission, ending his military service as a war-substantive lieutenant-colonel (honorary brigadier). He was awarded the Territorial Decoration (TD) in September 1956.

== Later life ==
=== Between Britain and Pakistan: 1948–1952 ===
Returning to London, Wheeler moved into the Hallam Street flat where his son and daughter-in-law were living. Wheeler and the latter disliked each other, so in summer 1950 he moved out and began renting an apartment in Mount Street. A year later he moved into his wife's house in Mallord Street, in an unsuccessful hope of reigniting their relationship. Taking up his part-time professorship at the Institute of Archaeology, he began to lecture to students almost every day. There, he found that he developed a relationship of mutual respect with the director, Childe, despite their strong personal and professional differences. In April 1949, after the retirement of Cyril Fox, Wheeler was nominated for the presidency of the Society of Antiquaries, but lost to James Mann; many archaeologists, including Childe and O. G. S. Crawford, resigned from the society in protest, deeming Wheeler to have been a far more appropriate candidate for the position. Wheeler was nevertheless elected director of the society. In 1950 he was awarded the Petrie Medal, and was knighted in the 1952 Birthday Honours, with his investiture by the Queen taking place at Buckingham Palace on 8 July. That same year he was invited to give the Norton lectures for the Archaeological Institute of America, and while in the United States was also awarded the Lucy Wharton Drexel medal at Pennsylvania. He nevertheless disliked the country, and in later life exhibited anti-Americanism.

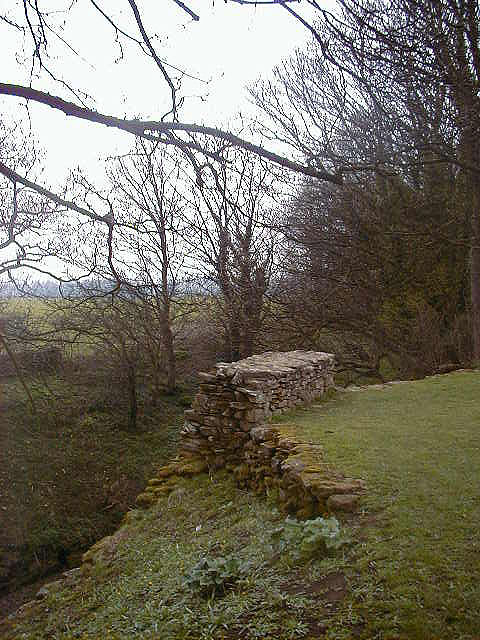
Wheeler excavated at Stanwick Iron Age fortifications; the section pictured is today known as Wheeler's Wall.

Wheeler spent three months in the Dominion of Pakistan during early 1949, where he was engaged in organising the fledgling Pakistani Archaeological Department with the aid of former members of the Archaeological Survey and new students whom he recruited. The Minister of Education, Fazlur Rahman, was sympathetic to Wheeler's plans, and the government agreed to establish a National Museum of Pakistan in Karachi, which opened in April 1950. Wheeler himself was appointed the first president of the Pakistani Museums Association, and found himself as a mediator in the arguments between India and Pakistan over the redistribution of archaeological and historic artefacts following the partition. He also wrote a work of archaeological propaganda for the newly formed state, Five Thousand Years of Pakistan (1950).

To instruct new Pakistani students in the methods of archaeology, in early 1950 Wheeler ran a training excavation at Mohenjo-daro; there, he was joined by the British student Leslie Alcock, who spoke both Punjabi and Urdu and who was appointed a site supervisor by Wheeler. This excavation proved to be the only one for which Wheeler would not write and publish a full excavation report. Instead, he made reference to its findings in his book The Indus Civilization, published as part of the series The Cambridge History of India. His relationship with the Pakistani government had become strained, so he declined to return to work for them for a third year.

Wheeler had been keen to return to excavation in Britain. Based on the one he had organised in India, Wheeler developed an archaeological training course, which he ran at Verulamium in the summer of 1949 to instruct British students in the methodologies of excavation. In summer 1950, he was invited by the Royal Commission on Historical Monuments to direct a trial excavation at Bindon Hill in Dorset. It was a leisurely project which he treated as a seaside holiday. He was invited by the Ancient Monuments Department of the Ministry of Works to excavate the Stanwick Iron Age Fortifications in North Riding, Yorkshire, which he proceeded to do over the summers of 1951 and 1952. Aided by many old friends and colleagues from within the British archaeological scene, he was joined by Alcock and Alcock's wife, among others. Wheeler published his report on the site in 1954.

In 1949, Wheeler was appointed Honorary Secretary of the British Academy after Frederic G. Kenyon stepped down from the position. According to Piggott, the institution had "unhappily drifted into senility without the excuse of being venerable", and Wheeler devoted much time attempting to revitalise the organisation and ensured that Charles Webster was appointed president. Together, Wheeler and Webster sought to increase the number of younger members of the academy, increasing the number of Fellows who were permitted to join and proposing that those over 75 years of age not be permitted to serve on the organisation's council; this latter measure was highly controversial, but, though defeated in 1951, Wheeler and Webster were able to push it through in 1952. In doing so, Piggott stated, Wheeler helped rid the society of its "self-perpetuating gerontocracy". To help him in these projects, Wheeler employed a personal assistant, Molly Myers, who remained with him for the rest of his life.

=== Popular fame: 1952–1969 ===
In 1956, Wheeler retired from his part-time professorship at the Institute of Archaeology. Childe was also retiring from his position of director that year, and Wheeler involved himself in the arguments surrounding who should replace him. Wheeler vocally opposed the nomination of W.F. Grimes, deeming his career undistinguished; instead, he championed Glyn Daniel as a candidate, although ultimately Grimes was selected. That year, Wheeler's marriage broke down, and he moved from his wife's house to a former brothel at 27 Whitcomb Street in central London. From 1954 to 1959, he served as the president of the Society of Antiquaries, and after resigning supported Ian Richmond as his replacement; however, Joan Evans was selected. From 1964 to 1966 he served as chairman of the Ancient Monuments Board, stepping down when he concluded that he was too old for the role. In December 1963, Wheeler underwent a prostate operation that went wrong, and was hospitalised for over a month. In November 1967, Wheeler became a Member of the Order of the Companions of Honour (CH), and in 1968 he became a Fellow of the Royal Society (FRS).

==== Media fame and public archaeology ====
Wheeler became famous in Britain as "the embodiment of popular archaeology through the medium of television". In 1952, Wheeler was invited to be a panelist on the new BBC television series Animal, Vegetable, Mineral?. Based on the American quiz programme What in the World?, the show was hosted by Glyn Daniel and featured three experts in archaeology, anthropology, and natural history being asked to identify artefacts that had been selected from various museums. Wheeler is alleged to have prepared for the show by checking beforehand which objects had been temporarily removed from display. The show proved popular with British audiences, and would air for six more years. It brought Wheeler to public attention, resulting in a Television Personality of the Year award for him in 1954. He also appeared in an episode of Buried Treasure, an archaeology show also hosted by Daniel, in which the pair travelled to Denmark to discuss Tollund Man. In 1957, he appeared in a second episode of Buried Treasure, for which he travelled to Pakistan to discuss that nation's archaeology, and in 1958 again appeared in an episode, this time on the site of Great Zimbabwe in Southern Rhodesia. In 1959 he presented his own three-part series on The Grandeur That Was Rome, for which he travelled to Hadrian's Wall, Pompeii, and Leptis Magna; the show failed to secure high ratings, and was Wheeler's last major foray into television. Meanwhile, he also made appearances on BBC radio, initially featuring on the John Irving series The Archaeologist, but later presenting his own eight-part series on Roman Britain and also appearing on the series Asian Club, which was aimed primarily at newly arrived migrants from the Indian subcontinent.

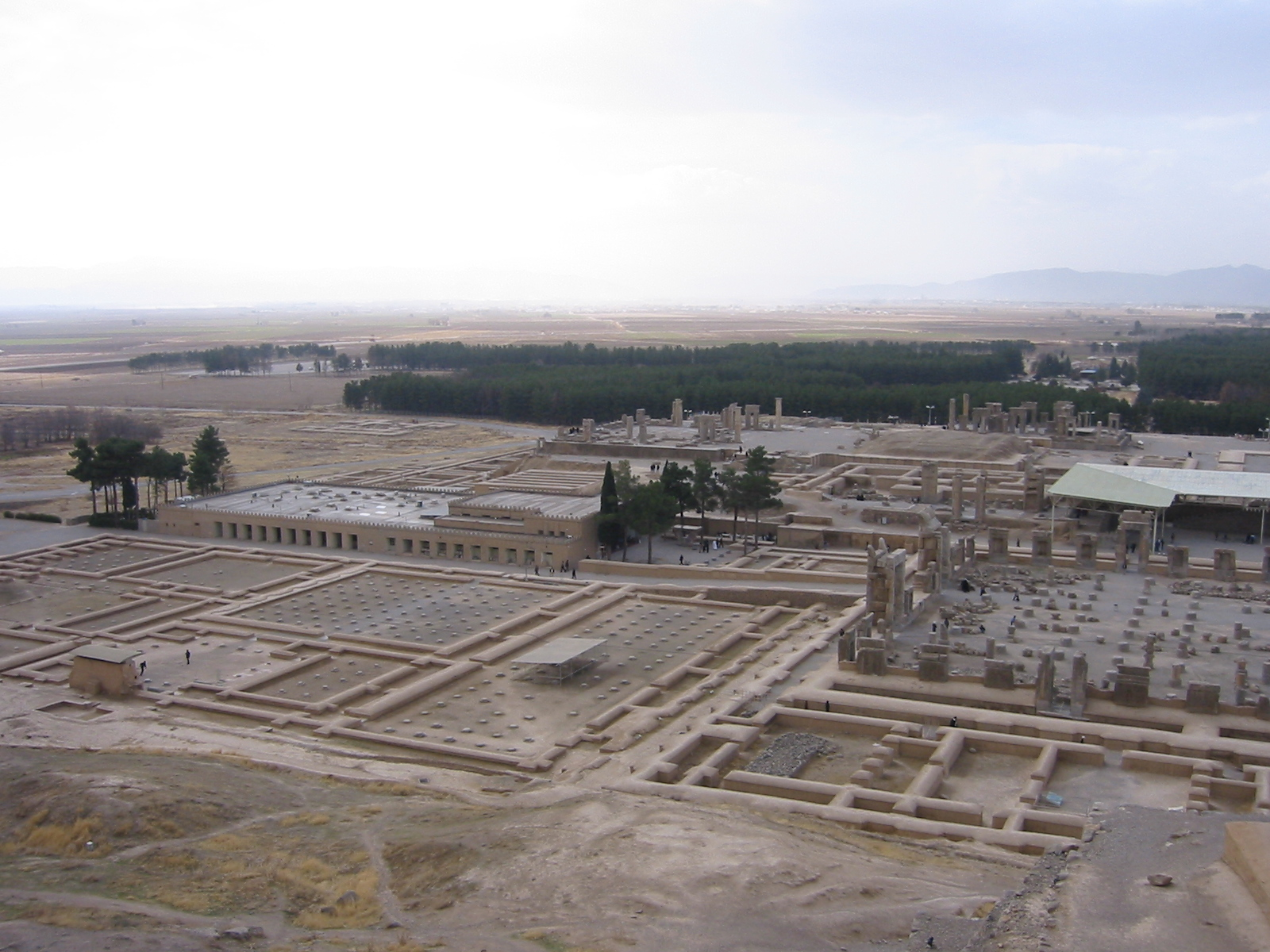
Wheeler wrote a book on the city of Persepolis in Iran.

From 1954 onward, Wheeler began to devote an increasing amount of his time to encouraging greater public interest in archaeology, and it was in that year that he obtained an agent. Oxford University Press also published two of his books in 1954. The first was a book on archaeological methodologies, Archaeology from the Earth, which was translated into various languages. The second was Rome Beyond the Imperial Frontier, discussing evidence for Roman activity at sites such as Arikamedu and Segontium. In 1955 Wheeler released his episodic autobiography, Still Digging, which had sold over 70,000 copies by the end of the year. In 1959, Wheeler wrote Early India and Pakistan, which was published as part as Daniel's "Ancient Peoples and Places" series for Thames and Hudson; as with many earlier books, he was criticised for rushing to conclusions.

He wrote the section entitled "Ancient India" for Piggott's edited volume The Dawn of Civilisation, which was published by Thames and Hudson in 1961, before writing an introduction for Roger Wood's photography book Roman Africa in Colour, which was also published by Thames and Hudson. He then agreed to edit a series for the publisher, known as "New Aspects of Antiquity", through which they released a variety of archaeological works. The rival publisher Weidenfeld & Nicolson had also persuaded Wheeler to work for them, securing him to write many sections of their book Splendours of the East. They also published his 1968 book Flames Over Persepolis, in which Wheeler discussed Persepolis and the Persian Empire in the year that it was conquered by Alexander the Great.

In 1954, the tour company R.K. Swan invited Wheeler to provide lectures on the archaeology of ancient Greece aboard their Hellenic cruise line, which he did in 1955. In 1957, he then gave a guided tour of the archaeology of the Indian subcontinent for the rival tour company Fairways and Swinford. After Swans appointed him to the position of chairman of their Hellenic Cruise division, he made two fortnight tours a year, in spring and summer. In late 1969 he conducted the Swans tour to the Indian subcontinent, visiting the south and east of the republic as well as Ceylon. During this period, Wheeler had kept in contact with many of his friends and colleagues in India and Pakistan, helping to secure them work and funding where possible.

Wheeler had continued his archaeological investigations, and in 1954 led an expedition to the Somme and Pas de Calais where he sought to obtain more information on the French Iron Age to supplement that gathered in the late 1930s. Pakistan's Ministry of Education invited Wheeler to return to their country in October 1956. Here, he undertook test excavations at Charsada to determine a chronology of the site. In 1965, he agreed to take on the position of president of the Camelot Research Committee, which had been established to promote the findings of excavations at Cadbury Castle in Somerset run by his friends Ralegh Radford and Alcock; the project ended in 1970. He also agreed to sit as chairman of the Archaeological Committee overseeing excavations at York Minster, work which occupied him into the 1970s. Wheeler had also continued his work with museums, campaigning for greater state funding for them. While he had become a trustee of the institution in 1963, he achieved publicity for vocally criticising the British Museum as "a mountainous corpse", lambasting it as being poorly managed and overcrowded with artefacts. The BBC staged a public debate with the museum director Frank Francis.

==== British Academy and UNESCO ====
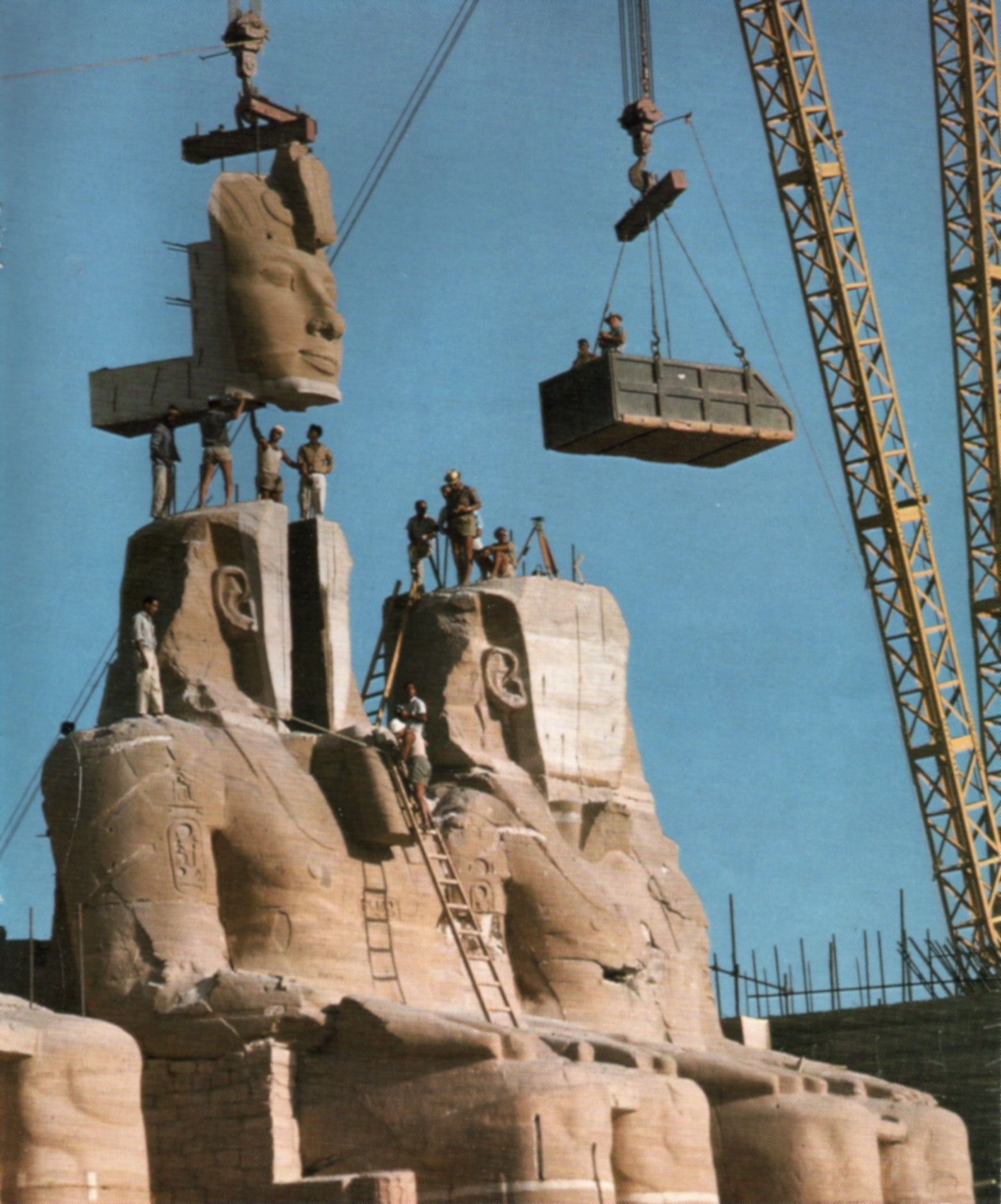
Wheeler was part of the UNESCO team that had the Abu Simbel temples and their sculptures moved to protect them from flooding (pictured).

As Honorary Secretary of the British Academy, Wheeler focused on increasing the organisation's revenues, thus enabling it to expand its remit. He developed personal relationships with various employees at the British Treasury, and offered the academy's services as an intermediary in dealing with the Egypt Exploration Society, the British School at Athens, the British School at Rome, the British School at Ankara, the British School in Iraq, and the British School at Jerusalem, all of which were then directly funded independently by the Treasury. Accepting this offer, the Treasury agreed to double its funding of the academy to £5,000 a year. Approaching various charitable foundations, from 1955 Wheeler also secured funding from both the Pilgrim Trust and the Nuffield Foundation, and in 1957 then secured additional funding from the Rockefeller Foundation.

With this additional money, the academy was able to organise a survey of the state of the humanities and social sciences in the United Kingdom, authoring a report that was published by Oxford University Press in 1961 as Research in the Humanities and the Social Sciences. On the basis of this report, Wheeler was able to secure a dramatic rise in funding from the British Treasury; they increased their annual grant to £25,000, and promised that this would increase to £50,000 shortly after. According to his later biographer Jacquetta Hawkes, in doing so Wheeler raised the position of the academy to that of "the main source of official patronage for the humanities" within the United Kingdom, while Piggott stated that he set the organisation upon its "modern course".

To improve Britain's cultural influence abroad, Wheeler had been urging the establishment of a British Institute of History and Archaeology in East Africa, touring East Africa itself in August 1955. In 1956, the academy requested £6,000 from the Treasury to fund this new institution, to which they eventually agreed in 1959. The institute was initially established in Dar es Salaam in 1961, although later relocated to Nairobi. Meanwhile, Wheeler had also been campaigning for the establishment of a British Institute of Persian Studies, a project which was supported by the British Embassy in Tehran; they hoped that it would rival the successful French Institute in the city. In 1960, the Treasury agreed, with the new institution being housed on the premises of the University of Tehran. He further campaigned for the establishment of a British Institute in Japan, although these ideas were scrapped amid the British financial crisis of 1967.

Wheeler retained an active interest in the running of these British institutions abroad; in 1967 he visited the British School in Jerusalem amid the Six-Day War between Israel and its Arab neighbours, and in January 1968 visited the Persian institute with the archaeologist Max Mallowan and Mallowan's wife Agatha Christie, there inspecting the excavations at Siraf. In 1969 he proceeded to the Italian city of Rome to inspect the British School there. That year, he resigned as Honorary Secretary of the academy. The position became a salaried, professional one, with the numismatist Derek Allen taking on the position.

Recognising his stature within the archaeological establishment, the government appointed Wheeler as the British representative on a UNESCO project to undertake a programme of rescue archaeology in the Nile Valley ahead of the construction of the Aswan Dam, which was going to flood large areas of Egypt and Sudan. Personally securing UK funding for the project, he deemed it an issue of national and personal shame when he was unable to persuade the British government to supply additional funding for the relocation of the Abu Simbel temples. In October 1968, he took part in a UNESCO visit to Pakistan to assess the state of Mohenjo-daro, writing the project's report on how the archaeological site could best be preserved. His involvement with UNESCO continued for the rest of his life, and in March 1973 he was invited to the organisation's conference in Paris.

=== Final years: 1970–1976 ===
During his final years, Wheeler remained involved in various activities, for instance sitting on the advisory panel of the Antiquity journal and the Management Committee of the Royal Archaeological Institute. In March 1971, the archaeologist Barry Cunliffe and a number of his undergraduate students at the University of Southampton organised a conference on the subject of "The Iron Age and its Hillforts" to celebrate Wheeler's eightieth birthday. Wheeler attended the event, whose conference proceedings were published as a festschrift for the octogenarian. In spring 1973, Wheeler returned to BBC television for two episodes of the archaeology-themed series Chronicle in which he discussed his life and career. The episodes were well received, and Wheeler became a close friend of the show's producer, David Collison. 1974 saw Wheeler appear in a series of six BBC TV interviews with presenter and broadcaster Magnus Magnusson called "Sir Mortimer and Magnus" during which he talked anecdotally about his life and work.

In the 1970s, Wheeler became increasingly forgetful and came to rely largely on his assistant, Molly Myres, to organise his affairs. Amid increasing ill health, in September 1973 he moved full-time into Myres's house in Leatherhead, Surrey, although he continued to use his central London flat during day-trips to the city. There, he wrote a final book, My Archaeological Mission to India and Pakistan, although much of the text was culled from his previous publications; it was published by Thames and Hudson in 1976. Following a stroke, Wheeler died at Myers' home on 22 July 1976. In memoriam, the British Academy, Royal Academy, and Royal Society flew their flags at half-mast. Wheeler's funeral was held with full military honours at a local crematorium, while a larger memorial service was held in St James's Church, Piccadilly in November.

== Personal life ==
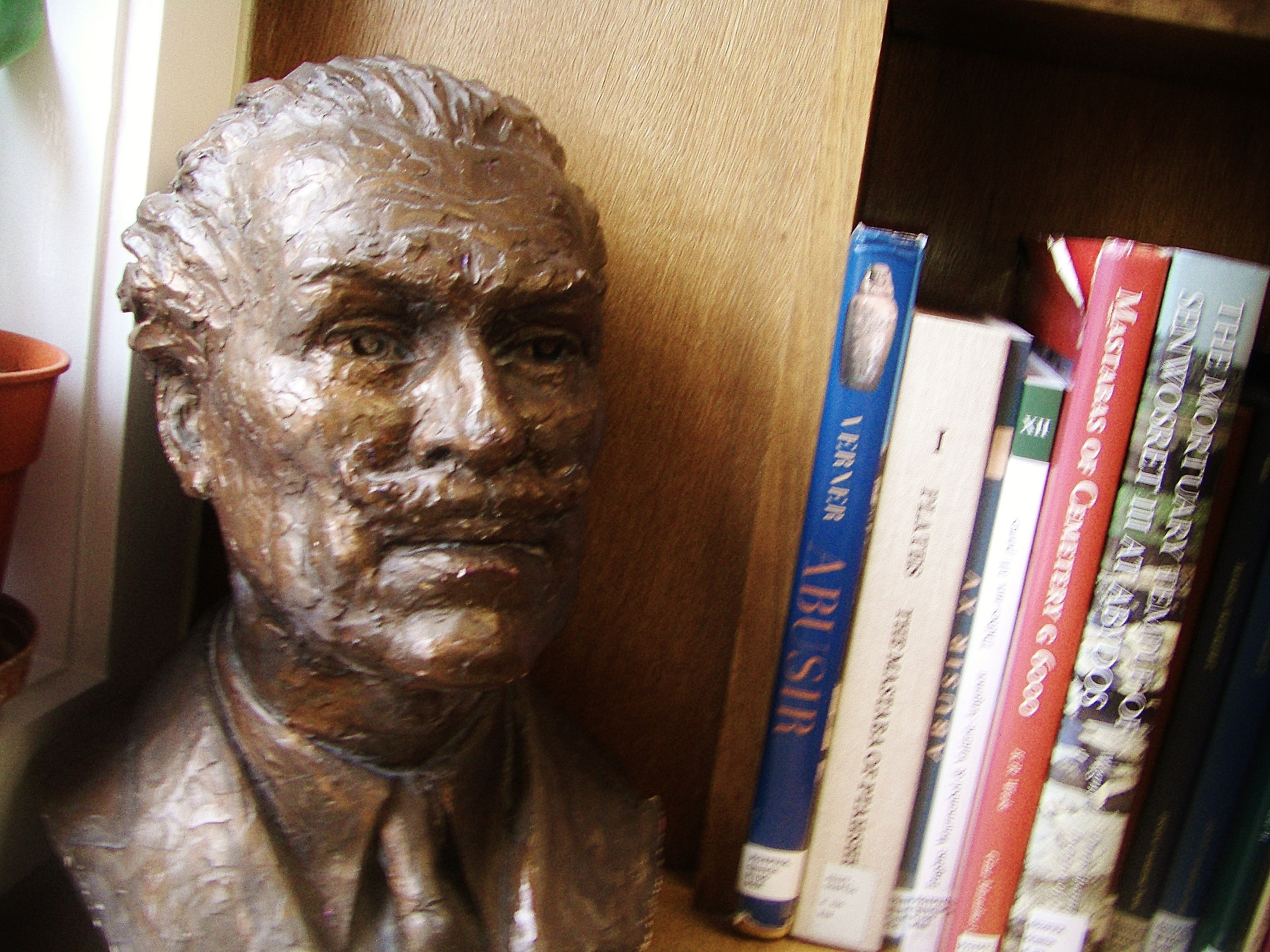
Bronze bust of Wheeler at the UCL Institute of Archaeology's library

Wheeler was known as "Rik" among friends. He divided opinion among those who knew him, with some loving and others despising him, and during his lifetime, he was often criticised on both scholarly and moral grounds.

Archaeologist Sir Max Mallowan asserted that he "was a delightful, light-hearted and amusing companion, but those close to him knew that he could be a dangerous opponent if threatened with frustration". His charm offensives were often condemned as being insincere.

During excavations, he was known as an authoritarian leader but favoured those who he thought exhibited bravery by standing up to his authority. Hence, he has been termed "a benevolent dictator". He was meticulous in his writings, and would repeatedly revise and rewrite both pieces for publication and personal letters. Throughout his life, he was a heavy smoker.

Wheeler expressed the view that he was "the least political of mortals". Despite not taking a strong interest in politics, Wheeler was described by his biographer as "a natural conservative"; for instance, during his youth he was strongly critical of the Suffragettes and their cause of greater legal rights for women.

Nevertheless, he was "usually happy to advance young women professionally", something that may have been based largely on his sexual attraction toward them. He expressed little interest in his relatives; in later life, he saw no reason to have a social relationship with people purely on the basis of family ties.

Wheeler was married three times. In May 1914, Wheeler married Tessa Verney. Tessa became an accomplished archaeologist, and they collaborated until her death in 1936. Their only child, Michael Mortimer Wheeler, was born in January 1915; he became a barrister. Following Tessa's death, in 1939, Wheeler married Mavis de Vere Cole. Their relationship was strained; Cole's diaries revealed that Wheeler hit her when she annoyed him, which he was later shocked at having done.

In 1945, Mortimer Wheeler married his third wife, Margaret Collingridge. Although they became estranged in 1956, Collingridge's Catholicism prevented divorce. Meanwhile, Wheeler was well known for his conspicuous promiscuity, favouring young women for one-night stands, many of whom were his students. He was further known for having casual sex in public places. That behaviour led to much emotional suffering among his various wives and mistresses of which he was aware.

== Reception and legacy ==
"He was a true innovator in archaeology, an inspired teacher, [and] had the dramatic gifts to enable him to spread his own enthusiasm among multitudes. He developed powers of command and creative administration that brought him extraordinary successes in energising feeble institutions and creating new ones."

— Jacquetta Hawkes, 1982.

Wheeler has been termed "the most famous British archaeologist of the twentieth century" by archaeologists Gabriel Moshenska and Tim Schadla-Hall. Highlighting his key role in encouraging interest in archaeology throughout British society, they stated that his "mastery of public archaeology was founded on his keen eye for value and a showman's willingness to package and sell the past". This was an issue about which Wheeler felt very strongly; writing his obituary for the Biographical Memoirs of Fellows of the Royal Society, the English archaeologist Stuart Piggott noted that Wheeler placed "great importance to the archaeologist's obligation to the public, on whose support the prosecution of his subject ultimately depended."

Piggott believed that Wheeler's greatest impact was as "the great innovator in field techniques", comparing him in this respect to Pitt-Rivers. Piggott stated that the "importance of Wheeler's contribution to archaeological technique, enormous and far-reaching, lies in the fact that in the early 1920s he not only appreciated and understood what Pitt-Rivers had done, but saw that his work could be used as a basis for adaptation, development and improvement." L. C. Carr stated that it was for his methodological developments, oft termed "the Wheeler Method", that Wheeler was best known; in this she contrasted him with those archaeologists who were best known for their associations with a specific archaeological site, such as Arthur Evans and Knossos or Leonard Woolley and Ur.

Wheeler was well known for his publications on archaeological matters; Carr stated that both Wheeler and his first wife emphasised "technical rigour and a full presentation of materials unearthed, as well as a literary discussion of their meaning calculated to appeal to a larger audience." Focusing on Wheeler's publications regarding South Asian archaeology, Sudeshna Guha noted that he "produced an assemblage of image-objects that embodied the precision he demanded from excavation photography." Mallowan noted that "Immediate and swift presentation of results was more important to him than profound scholarship, although his critical sense made him conscious that it was necessary to maintain high standards and he would approve of nothing that was slipshod." Jacquetta Hawkes commented that he made errors in his interpretation of the archaeological evidence because he was "sometimes too sure of being right, too ready to accept his own authority". She asserted that while Wheeler was not an original thinker, he had "a vision of human history that enabled him to see each discovery of its traces, however small, in its widest significance."

"Despite his very short stay as Director General, [Wheeler] infused an element of urgency into the Indian archaeological scene. With him archaeology in India became exciting, worth doing for its own sake. This excitement is apparent in the articles that he wrote, and still affects those who know the scene."

— Dilip K. Chakrabarti, 1982

Piggott claimed that Wheeler's appointment as director-general of the Archaeological Survey of India represented "the most remarkable archaeological achievement of his career, an enormous challenge accepted and surmounted in the autocratic and authoritarian terms within which he could best deploy his powers as administrator and excavator. No other archaeologist of the time, it seems fair to remark, could have come near to attaining his command of incisive strategy and often ruthless tactics which won him the bewildered admiration and touching devotion of his Indian staff." The Indian archaeologist Dilip K. Chakrabarti later stated that Wheeler's accomplishments while in India were "considerable", particularly given the socio-political turmoil of independence and partition. Chakrabarti stated that Wheeler had contributed to South Asian archaeology in various ways: by establishing a "total view" of the region's development from the Palaeolithic onward, by introducing new archaeological techniques and methodologies to the subcontinent, and by encouraging Indian universities to begin archaeological research. Ultimately, Chakrabarti was of the opinion that Wheeler had "prepared the archaeology of the subcontinent for its transition to modernity in the post-Partition period." Similarly, Peter Johansen praised Wheeler for systematising and professionalising Indian archaeology and for "instituting a clearly defined body of techniques and methods for field and laboratory work and training."

On Wheeler's death, H. D. Sankalia of Deccan College, Pune, described him as "well known among Old World archaeologists in the United States", particularly for his book Archaeology from the Earth and his studies of the Indus Valley Civilisation. In its 2013 obituary of the English archaeologist Mick Aston, British Archaeology magazine – the publication of the Council for British Archaeology – described Aston as "the Mortimer Wheeler of our times" because despite the strong differences between their personalities, both had done much to bring archaeology to the British public. However, writing in 2011, Moshenska and Schadla-Hall asserted that Wheeler's reputation has not undergone significant revision among archaeologists, but that instead he had come to be remembered as "a cartoonish and slightly eccentric figure" whom they termed "Naughty Morty". Carr described the Institute of Archaeology as "one of the [Wheeler] couple's most permanent memorials."

=== Mortimer Wheeler Archaeological Lectures ===
On the proposal of Council of the British Academy, a lecture series was established to commemorate Sir Mortimer Wheeler's 80th birthday. The lectures were given annually from 1971 to 1991 and then discontinued as a series of single lectures. In 1992 and again in 2001, Wheeler Lectures were keynote presentations in British Academy archaeological conferences.

=== Biographies and studies ===
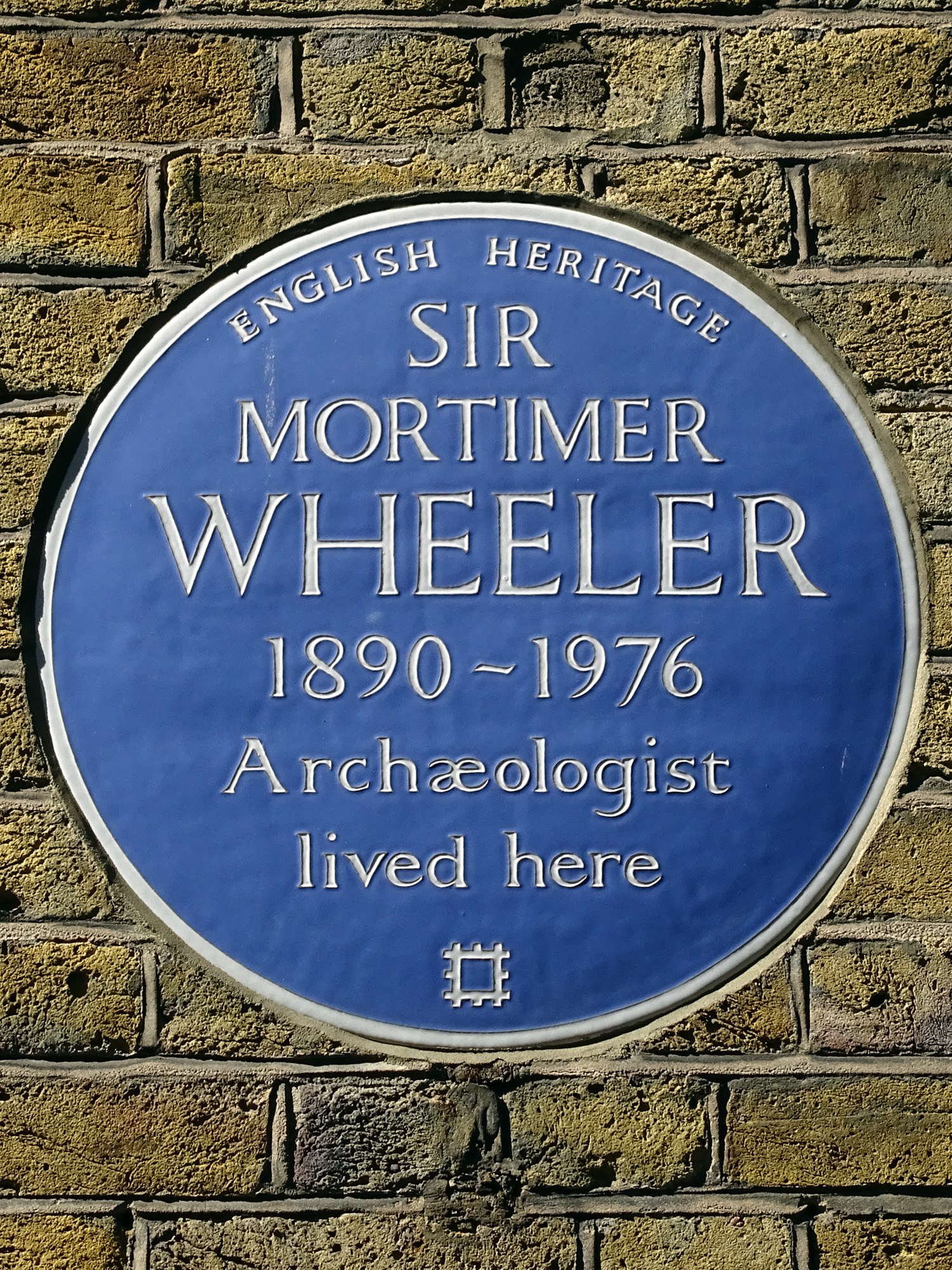
A blue plaque marks Wheeler's former residence in the City of Westminster, London.

In 1960, Ronald William Clark published a biography titled Sir Mortimer Wheeler. FitzRoy Somerset, 4th Baron Raglan, reviewed the volume for the journal Man, describing "this very readable little book" as being "adulatory" in tone, "but hardly more so than its subject deserves." In 1982, the archaeologist Jacquetta Hawkes published a second biography, Mortimer Wheeler: Adventurer in Archaeology. Hawkes admitted she had developed "a very great liking" for Wheeler, having first met him when she was an archaeology student at the University of Cambridge. She believed that he had "a daemonic energy", with his accomplishments in India being "almost superhuman". Ultimately, she thought of him as being "an epic hero in an anti-heroic age" in which growing social egalitarianism had stifled and condemned aspects of his greatness.

In the 2000 film Hey Ram, the lead character, Saket Ram (played by Kamal Haasan) and his friend, Amjad Khan (played by Shah Rukh Khan) are shown as employees of Wheeler, who was portrayed by Lewis K. Elbinger, before the 1947 Hindu–Muslim riots. In a 2003 volume of the South Asian Studies journal, Sudeshna Gusha published a research article examining Wheeler's use of photography in his excavations and publications in the Indian subcontinent. In 2011, the academic journal Public Archaeology published a research paper by Moshenska and Schadla-Hall that analysed Wheeler's role in presenting archaeology to the British public. Two years later, the Papers from the Institute of Archaeology issued a short comic strip by Moshenska and Alex Salamunovich depicting Wheeler's activities in studying the archaeology of Libya during World War II.

== Bibliography ==
A bibliography of Wheeler's published books was included by Piggott in his obituary, and again by Hawkes in her biography.

Year of publication	Title	Co-author(s)	Publisher
1923	Segontium and the Roman Occupation of Wales	–	The Honourable Society of Cymmrodorion (London)
1925	Prehistoric and Roman Wales	–	Clarendon Press (Oxford)
1926	The Roman Fort Near Brecon	–	The Honourable Society of Cymmrodorion (London)
1927	London and the Vikings	–	London Museum (London)
1930	London in Roman Times	–	London Museum (London)
1932	Report on the Excavations of the Prehistoric, Roman and Post-Roman Site in Lydney Park, Gloucestershire	Tessa Wheeler	Oxford University Press for the Society of Antiquaries (London)
1935	London and the Saxons	–	London Museum (London)
1936	Verulamium: A Belgic and Two Roman Cities	Tessa Wheeler	Society of Antiquaries (London)
1943	Maiden Castle, Dorset	–	Society of Antiquaries (London)
1950	Five Thousand Years of Pakistan	–	Christopher Johnson (London)
1953	The Indus Civilization	–	Cambridge University Press (Cambridge)
1954	The Stanwick Fortifications, North Riding of Yorkshire	–	Society of Antiquaries (London)
1954	Archaeology From the Earth	–	Oxford University Press (Oxford)
1954	Rome Beyond the Imperial Frontiers	–	G. Bell and Sons (London)
1955	Still Digging: Adventures in Archaeology	–	Michael Joseph (London)
1957	Hill Forts of Northern France	Katherine M. Richardson; M. Aylwin Cotton	Society of Antiquaries (London)
1959	Early India and Pakistan: To Ashoka.	–	Thames and Hudson (London)
1962	Charsada: A Metropolis of the North-West Frontier	–	Government of Pakistan and the British Academy (London)
1964	Roman Art and Architecture ('The World of Art Library' series)	–	Thames and Hudson (London)
1966	Alms for Oblivion: An Antiquary's Notebook	–	Weidenfeld and Nicolson (London)
1968	Flames Over Persepolis	–	Weidenfeld and Nicolson (London)
1970	The British Academy, 1949–1968	–	Oxford University Press for the British Academy (London)
1976	My Archaeological Mission to India and Pakistan.	–	Thames and Hudson (London)

Preceded by K. N. Dikshit	Director general of the Archaeological Survey of India; 1944–1948	Succeeded by N. P. Chakravarti
