= Wheeler–Kenyon method =

Method of archaeological excavation

A Square Unit of an Exploration 02

The Wheeler–Kenyon method is a method of archaeological excavation. The technique originates from the work of Mortimer Wheeler and Tessa Wheeler at Verulamium (1930–35), and was later refined by Kathleen Kenyon during her excavations at Jericho (1952–58). The Wheeler–Kenyon system involves digging within a series of squares that can vary in size set within a larger grid. This leaves a freestanding wall of earth—known as a "balk"—that can range from 50 cm for temporary grids, and measure up to 2 metres in width for a deeper square. The normal width of a permanent balk is 1 metre on each side of a unit. These vertical slices of earth allow archaeologists to compare the exact provenance of a found object or feature to adjacent layers of earth ("strata"). During Kenyon's excavations at Jericho, this technique helped discern the long and complicated occupational history of the site. It was believed that this approach allowed more precise stratigraphic observations than earlier "horizontal exposure" techniques that relied on architectural and ceramic analysis.

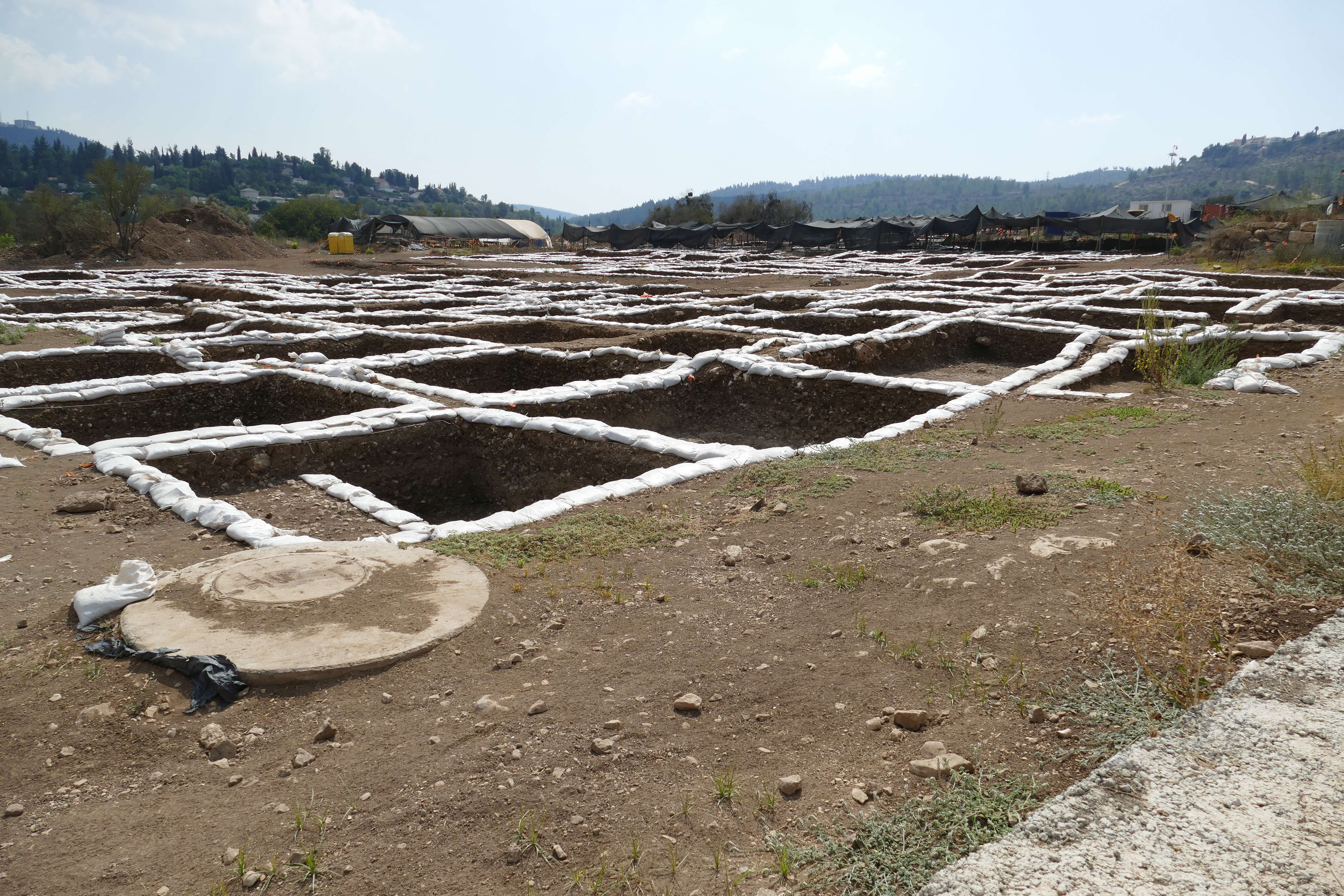
Excavation at Moza, Israel

== History ==
A significant inspiration for the Wheeler-Kenyon Method came from Mortimer Wheeler’s mentor Augustus Pitt Rivers. Pitt Rivers was significant for his time in his use of total recording, shifting the focus away from finding ‘treasure’ and towards recording every artefact and making detailed plans and sections of the site However, Bowden points out that Pitt-River’s excavation methods left ‘much to be desired’, with hand-shovelling techniques leaving many small artefacts such as flints and coins left undiscovered in spoil heaps. Therefore, at the time when the Wheelers were beginning their archaeological careers, even the most forward-thinking archaeological methodology was still very different from the methods recognised today.

There were two key sites Mortimer and Tessa Wheeler worked on in developing their ‘box-grid’ method; Lydney Park in Gloucester and Verulamium in Hertfordshire. The Lyndney Park Site was a Romano-British Temple Complex and Iron Mine, which had originally been excavated by Charles Bathurst in 1805, but had since become overgrown once again. The Wheelers worked on the site in the Summers of 1928 and 1929, with a full report being published in 1932, titled: Report on the Excavation of the Prehistoric, Roman, and post-Roman Site in Lydney Park, Gloucestershire. The lack of a surviving site archive for the excavation makes it difficult to assess what refinements were made in the Wheeler’s excavation methods at this time. However, the site report makes frequent mention of analysing the phases of occupation using the typological sequences of artefacts, and makes use of vertical section illustrations alongside its horizontal plans. This suggests that at Lyndey Park the Wheelers were beginning to appreciate the importance of recording a site’s stratigraphy in relation to finds, to the point that Carr attributes Lydney Park as the groundwork of the Wheeler-Kenyon Method. The site of Verulamium was extremely important for the refinement of the Wheelers' excavation technique; it was where they practised the ideas they had formed at Lydney Park, ahead of their total synthesis at the site of Maiden Castle. Verulamium also served to spread the Wheelers' methodology among a new generation of archaeologists by using the excavation to train students from the London Museum. This included a young Kathleen Kenyon, who joined the excavation in 1930 and was so invaluable that in 1934 the Wheelers left her in charge of excavating a Roman theatre while they moved to work on Maiden Castle. In the Wheelers' subsequent report on Verulamium, she is credited as having ‘supervised most of the laborious excavation of the ‘Fosse’, and later directed the clearing of the theatre.’ Kenyon’s contribution to the Wheeler Box Grid Method came from her 1952 to 1958 excavation at Jericho in Palestine, where the methodology of the Wheelers finally cemented into the Wheeler–Kenyon method. The Wheeler-Kenyon method was utilised in many archaeological projects active at the time, including by Robert Braidwood's 1949 to 1955 mission at the Neolithic village of Jarmo in the Kurdistan Region of Iraq.

The Wheeler–Kenyon method has faced significant criticism over time, forming a rival school of thought to the advocates of open area excavation. However, there is no doubt that the Wheeler–Kenyon method was a key moment of innovation in archaeological methodology. The method took the step of placing stratigraphy at the centre of excavations, where in previous years, even for innovators such as Pitt-Rivers, it had remained something of an afterthought. Thus, even if it is not used to as great an extent in the modern day, the Wheeler-Kenyon Method remains an important part of archaeological history in the 20th century.

== Methodology ==
Sir Mortimer Wheeler laid out the Box-grid method in his 1954 book, Archaeology from the Earth. Sir Mortimer was the sole author of this volume, due to Tessa Wheeler’s death in 1936. In the volume, Wheeler asserts that his square unit based method of excavation is the only method that satisfies the majority of an area-excavation’s principle requirements. First, to be easily divisible for record-keeping. Second, to be able to expand in any direction without compromising preliminary measurement records. Third, the preservation of as many vertical sections as possible. Fourth, to be able to eventually create a continuously exposed excavation. Fifth, to create routes to remove soil without crossing excavated surfaces, and lastly sufficient access to natural light. To achieve this, Wheeler proposes the use of square excavation units arranged in a grid pattern and divided by earth balks, thus allowing for one worker a finite excavation area and providing pathways for excess soil to be removed without trampling excavated ground. The principal goal of the method is to allow for the constant referral to the vertical profile of the site, a concept that was present by Pitt-River’s work at Cranbourne Chase, only on a much larger scale. While Pitt-River’s approach left a few isolated segments of soil from which to analyse stratigraphy, Wheeler’s box-grid method allowed for a more detailed profile of soil layers because profiles could be found across the entire site.

Wheeler offers specific guidance on the dimensions of the squares. For stability, each square should be approximately equal in side length to the anticipated maximum depth. Thus, the site’s potential depth must be anticipated before the laying out of squares can begin. For the balks, Wheeler recommends 3 feet as a general rule, as the balks will need to support significant traffic. Only for the shallower sites, around 10 feet in depth, does he suggest that a 2 feet wide balk would be appropriate (Wheeler, 1954 p. 65). In terms of laying out squares, Wheeler recommends the use of string and pegs, under careful supervision to ensure the highest level of precision possible. Interestingly, instead of marking out balks and excavation squares separately, Wheeler’s measurements include the 3-foot balk within the square’s measurement. Thus, if an excavation required 20 feet of depth, a grid of 20 foot squares would be laid out in string, and squares would be cut 1 ½ feet from the string, thus giving a balk of 3 feet and a square of 17 feet in length.

== Use at Maiden Castle ==
Excavations at Maiden Castle in Dorset revealed an extended history of settlement, ranging from a Neolithic settlement in the late third Millennium BCE, through the Bronze Age, the Iron Age, and culminating with a Romano-Celtic temple that remained in use until the fifth century CE. Mortimer Wheeler began to seek a fresh excavation project in 1934, even while the work at Verulamium continued, as he was reportedly growing tired of the Roman site. In his eyes, Maiden Castle offered an attractive opportunity because, although there was a Roman phase at the site, there were also older, pre-Roman phases to explore. Work began in 1934 and lasted until 1937. The project was sadly interrupted by the death of Tessa Wheeler in 1936. In his final 1943 publication of the excavations her husband described his work as 'less a report than the salvage of the report that should have been'. Nevertheless, Maiden Castle remains significant as the first site where the Wheeler box-grid method completed its first stage of development and could be applied with full force).

The hill's eastern entrance required particularly careful stratigraphic analysis, due to its extended use across multiple phases of occupation with new structures and alterations appearing to meet the needs of the occupants. The entrance was unusual for its kind in that it contained not one, but two portals; referred to for notation as North and South. The north portal was excavated in 1935, using trenching. Wheeler found the endeavour to be extremely difficult, due to the need for constant lateral enlargement confusing the systems of record which Wheeler describes as being in 'appalling complexity' by the end of the operation. Therefore, the following year when the South Portal was excavated, the recently created box-grid method was used, which proved to be far more straightforward to record with less risk of error.

Using the box-grid method on the South portal was vital in understanding the multiple phases of the site, which Wheeler divides into six key phases; two Roman, and four pre-Roman. Key changes to the portal that occurred over its Pre-Roman lifespan included the use of gates, the construction of wattle revetments and later dry limestone walling, and the addition of triangular ramparts and ditch barbicans in front of the portals to restrict access and create animal enclosures. Pottery and coins were used to correlate the site’s stratigraphy to specific eras, made possible by the distinct typological phases covered by the portals. Thus, the box grid method was the most appropriate excavation technique available because it allowed for the careful recording of the site’s complex stratigraphy.

== Archaeological Excavations Employing the Wheeler-Kenyon Method ==
- Verulamium (St Albans), England
- Maiden Castle, Dorset, England, 1934-1937
- Jericho
- Tel Rehov, Israel, 1997-2012

== Sources ==
- Callaway, Joseph A. (1979). "Dame Kathleen Kenyon 1906–1978". The Biblical Archaeologist. 42 (2). University of Chicago Press: 122–125. doi:10.1086/BIBLARCH3209373. S2CID 192064250.
- jstor.org
- online.vkrp.org
