= Tessa Wheeler =

British archaeologist (1893–1936)

Tessa Wheeler FSA
- Excavating at Verulamium in the early 1930s
- Born: Tessa Verney; 27 March 1893; Johannesburg, South Africa
- Died: 15 April 1936 (aged 43); London, England, UK
- Occupation: Archaeologist
- Spouse: Mortimer Wheeler (m. 1914)

Academic background
- Education: University College London

Academic work
- Discipline: Archaeology

Tessa Wheeler FSA (née Verney; 27 March 1893 – 15 April 1936) was a South Africa-born English archaeologist who made significant contributions to techniques used in archaeological excavation and contributed to the setting up of major British archaeological institutions after the Second World War.

Owing to the gender politics of the era, she remains best known as the wife and professional partner of Mortimer Wheeler. They collaborated on major excavations in Wales and England (including Segontium, Caerleon, and Verulamium) and their investigation of Maiden Castle, Dorset had been ongoing for two years when she died unexpectedly from complications following a minor operation.

== Early and private life ==
Tessa Verney was born in Johannesburg, the daughter of John Verney, a doctor, and Annie Booth Kilburn. She had an elder half-brother from her mother's first marriage. The family moved to Lewisham, south London, with her mother's third husband. She was educated at Addey and Stanhope School in Deptford, and read history at University College London from 1911 to 1914. She met her future husband Mortimer Wheeler in 1912, and they were married in May 1914. He served in the artillery in the First World War, initially as an instructor in the University of London Officers' Training Corps, and later at other places in Scotland and England. She accompanied Mortimer on his postings until he was sent to France in 1917. Their only child, Michael Mortimer Wheeler, was born in January 1915. He became a barrister and judge.

== Career ==
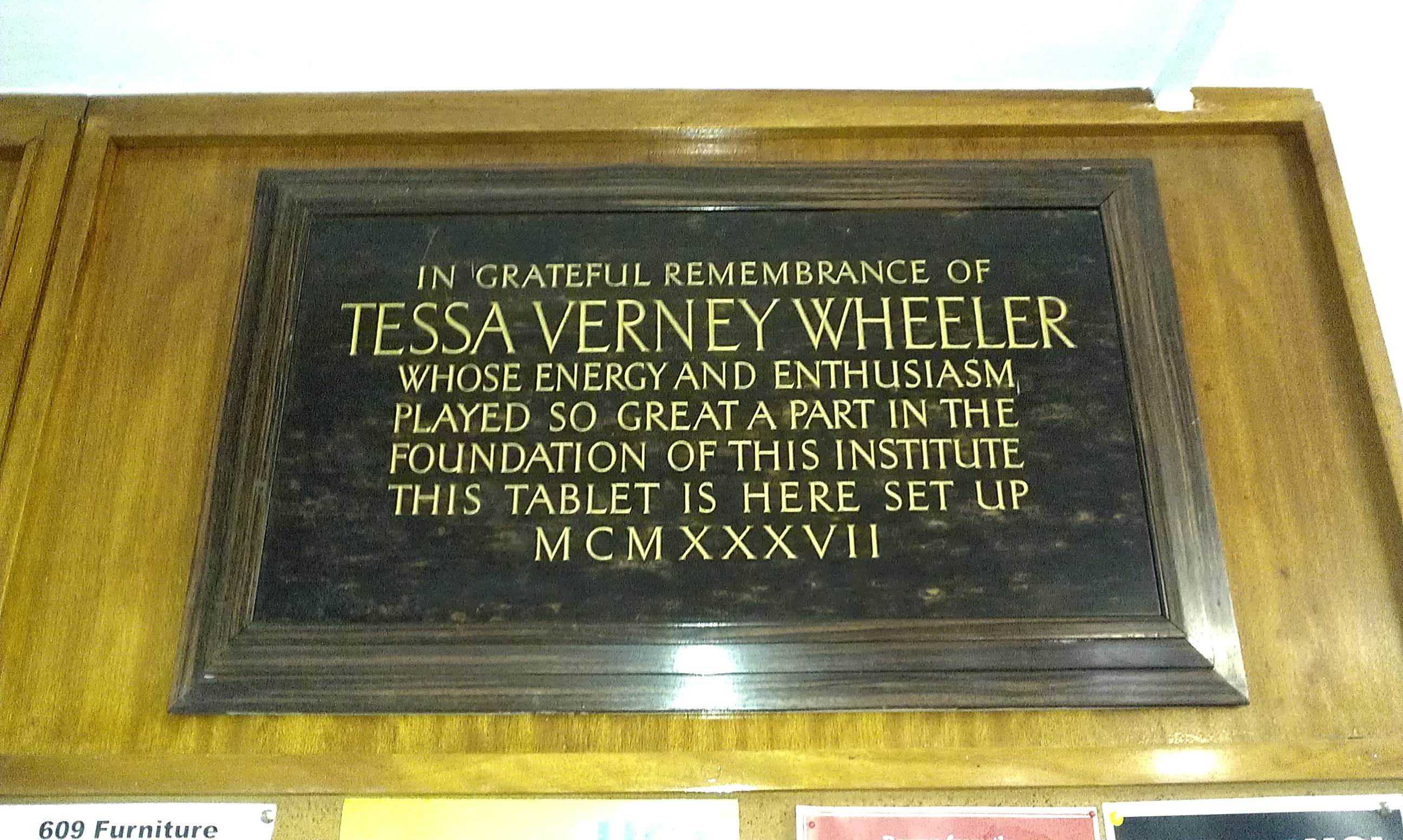
Memorial to Tessa Wheeler in the UCL Institute of Archaeology

Tessa followed her husband Mortimer to Cardiff in 1920 when he took up a post at the National Museum of Wales. She was the Keeper of Archaeology at the National Museum of Wales where her husband was promoted and held the position of Director from 1924 to 1926. They undertook excavations together at Segontium in 1921–22 and at Gaer in 1924–25, working as a team. Tessa organised the excavations, controlled finances, and recorded the finds, and Mortimer interpreted the results. They were preparing an excavation at Caerleon in 1926 when Mortimer was appointed Keeper of the London Museum. The family moved to London, but Tessa undertook the excavation on her own in the winter of 1926–27.

The excavation methods they used, for example the grid system (later developed further by Kathleen Kenyon and known as the Wheeler-Kenyon method), were significant advances in archaeological method, although later superseded. They were influenced greatly by the work of the archaeologist Lieutenant General Augustus Pitt Rivers (1827–1900). The two constant themes in their attempts to improve archaeological excavation were, first, to maintain strict stratigraphic control while excavating (for this purpose, the baulks between trenches served to retain a record of the strata that had been dug through), and, second, to publish the excavation promptly and in a form that would tell the story of the site to the intelligent reader. They also published their results quickly after the excavations concluded, and Mortimer proved adept at generating favourable publicity.

She became a lecturer at the London Museum in 1928, and became the second woman to be elected as a fellow of the Society of Antiquaries the same year. During her time in London she was also a member of the Research Council of the Society of Antiquaries. The Wheelers worked together to rejuvenate the London Museum and to establish an Institute of Archaeology in London, which was founded in 1934 and opened in 1937. She was an effective lecturer and teacher of the next generation of archaeology students.

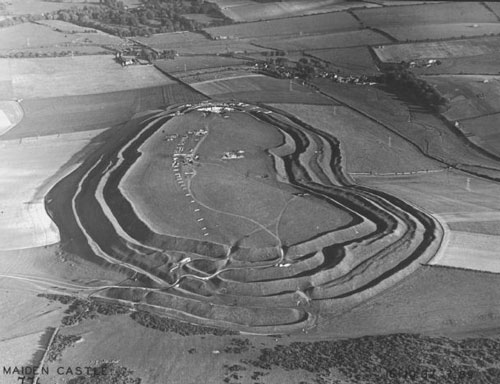
The excavations at Maiden Castle, Dorset in October 1937 were led by Mortimer Wheeler. Photograph by Major George Allen (1891–1940).

The Wheelers continued to work together, performing many major excavations within Britain, including that of the Roman villa at Lydney Park in 1928–29, Roman Verulamium (modern-day St Albans) in 1930–34, and the late Iron Age hill-fort of Maiden Castle, Dorset, which was assistant directed by Molly Cotton from 1934 to 1938. At Maiden Castle, the Wheelers collaborated with Beatrice de Cardi and Veronica Seton-Williams. The work from Caerleon, Lydney, and St Albans were published under their joint names.

Tessa's excavation of mosaics was seen as her professional trademark. She successfully removed a Roman palace mosaic floor with all pieces intact. Her aforementioned contribution to the Wheeler-Kenyon method (which was named after her, her husband and Kathleen Kenyon) is also a highlight of her professional career that continues to be important in archaeology today.

Tessa had ill-health, including blackouts and gastric issues. She may have exacerbated her symptoms through overwork and a desire for high standards in her work. After a minor operation in early 1936, she became seriously ill and died from a pulmonary embolism at the National Temperance Hospital in London. Her remains were cremated at Golders Green crematorium.

Prior to her death, Tessa arranged many of the practicalities of establishing the Institute of Archaeology, from finance and logistics to arrangement of accommodation at St John's Lodge, Regent's Park. The Institute began accepting students the year after Tessa's death.

She spent much of her early career in the shadow of her husband, like many earlier female archaeologists, but later work was published under their joint names and their contemporaries considered "the Wheelers" to be a team; some considered her to be the more talented field archaeologist.

== Legacy ==
A black marble memorial plaque to Tessa Wheeler was unveiled at the Institute of Archaeology in 1937. A biography was published by Lydia Carr in 2012.

== Publications ==
- Wheeler, T. 1928. The Caerleon Amphitheatre: a Summary. London: Bedford Press.
- Wheeler, R. E. M. & T. Verney Wheeler. 1928. "The Roman amphitheatre at Caerleon, Monmouthshire", Archaeologia, vol. 78. Oxford: The Society of Antiquaries.
- — 1932. Report on the Excavation of the Prehistoric, Roman, and Post-Roman site in Lydney Park, Gloucestershire (Reports of the Research Committee of the Society of Antiquaries of London 9). Oxford: The Society of Antiquaries.
- — 1936. Verulamium: a Belgic and two Roman cities (Reports of the Research Committee of the Society of Antiquaries of London 11). Oxford: The Society of Antiquaries.
