= The Dean Academy =

Location
- Church Road; Lydney, Gloucestershire, GL15 5DZ; England
- Coordinates: 51.72141°N 2.53619°W

Information
- Type: Academy
- Motto: Enjoyment, Achievement, Community.
- Trust: The Athelstan Trust UID: 3831
- Department for Education URN: 138421 Tables
- Ofsted: Reports
- Head Teacher: Hannah Rowlands
- Gender: Mixed
- Age: 11 to 16
- Enrolment: 609 (November 2019)
- Capacity: 1095
- Website: www.thedeanacademy.org

The Dean Academy (formerly Whitecross School) is a mixed secondary school located in Lydney in the English county of Gloucestershire.

== Location ==
The school is located on the edge of Lydney, a small river-side town in the Royal Forest of Dean in Gloucestershire. It adjoins the Lydney Park Estate on Church Road near Bathurst Park, St. Mary's Church and Lydney Town Hall.

== History ==
Whitecross School was a foundation school administered by Gloucestershire County Council. It converted to academy status on 1 November 2012 and was renamed The Dean Academy. It joined the Prospects Academy Trust but continued to co-ordinate with Gloucestershire County Council for admissions. In May 2014, it was announced that the trust was to cease operations, and The Dean Academy formally joined the Athelstan Academy Trust in March 2015. which also contains Malmesbury School and Bradon Forest School in Wiltshire.

In November 2015, the Dean Academy was put into special measures after a critical Ofsted report, and the headteacher, David Gaston, resigned. Following his resignation, John Barrett was head appointed teacher for the 2015–2016 school year. In September 2016, a new permanent head of school, Tom Beveridge, was appointed.

== Academics ==
The Dean Academy offers GCSEs, BTECs, OCR Nationals and ASDAN courses and programmes of study for pupils. The school no longer offers hair and beauty courses.

== Notable former pupils ==
=== Whitecross School ===
- Wayne Barnes, rugby union referee
- Paddy Henderson, Athlete and Journalist
- Andy Lewis, Rio 2016 Paralympic gold medalist
