= Forest of Dean Central Railway =

Former railway in Gloucestershire, United Kingdom

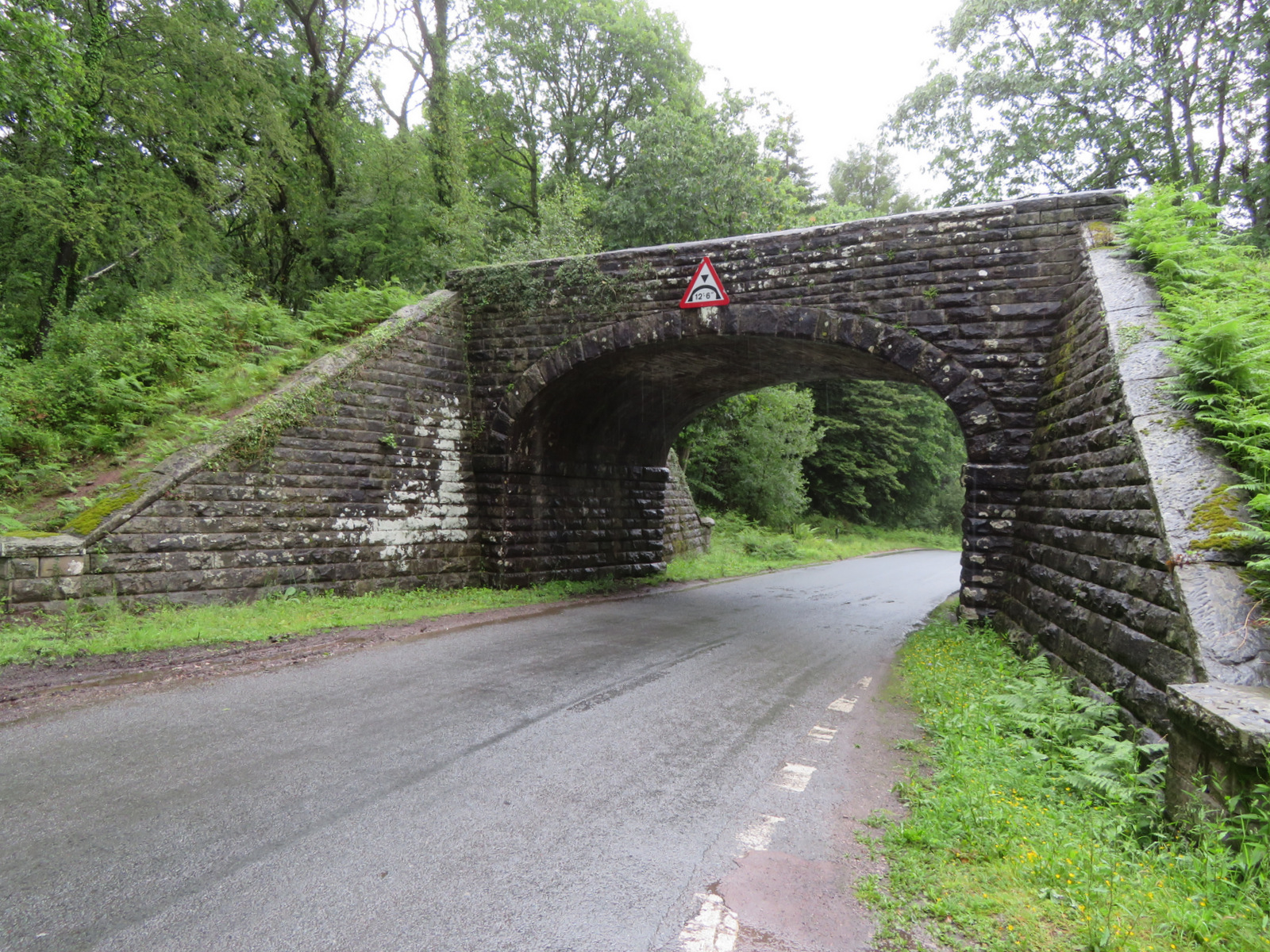
- Former bridge for the Forest of Dean Central Railway

Overview
- Status: closed
- Owner: Forest of Dean Central Railway until Great Western Railway absorbed it in 1923
- Locale: Gloucestershire
- Termini: Awre; New Fancy Colliery

Service
- Type: Heavy rail
- Operator(s): Great Western Railway

History
- Opened: 25 May 1868 to Howbeach, 1869 to New Fancy
- Closed: 1877 beyond Howbeach, October 1922 no regular trains beyond Blakeney, 2 August 1949 official closure

Technical
- Track gauge: 1,435 mm (4 ft 8 1/2 in) standard gauge [converted 11–13 May 1872 from 7 feet 1/4 inch (2.140 m)]

The Forest of Dean Central Railway was a mineral railway line designed to connect certain collieries in the central part of the Forest of Dean to a new dock at Brimspill on the River Severn. It was authorised by the Forest of Dean Central Railway Act 1856, but serious difficulties were encountered in raising the money to build it. It opened in 1868 by which time the principal colliery intended to be served had ceased operation. It was unable to finance the construction of the dock at Brimspill and relied on transfer of traffic to the main line of the South Wales Railway (later the Great Western Railway).

It was a broad gauge line, and it was worked from the outset by the Great Western Railway. It was converted to standard gauge in 1872. The limited traffic potential resulted in a continuing inability to pay routine outgoings, and it was leased to the Great Western Railway in 1885.

About 1921 the last colliery on the line ceased operation and the line was shortened back to Blakeney, where there was a goods depot. That business too ended in 1949, and there was no more commercial use of the line.

== Background ==
For centuries, the Forest of Dean has been an important site of mineral extraction: coal and iron ore, and also stone. Free Miners had certain exclusive rights to minerals, but the restriction on outside involvement had prevented the introduction of capital and large scale industrial processes. Moreover, the extremely poor road network in the area, due in part to the very hilly terrain, added cost to the products of the Forest. The Crown interest in timber had resulted in statutory control of development.

The small scale mining operations needed to get their output to market, generally by river transport on the Severn or the Wye, and a number of tramways, generally plateways, had been constructed. This culminated in the construction of the Severn and Wye Railway and the Forest of Dean Railway.

== Early proposals ==
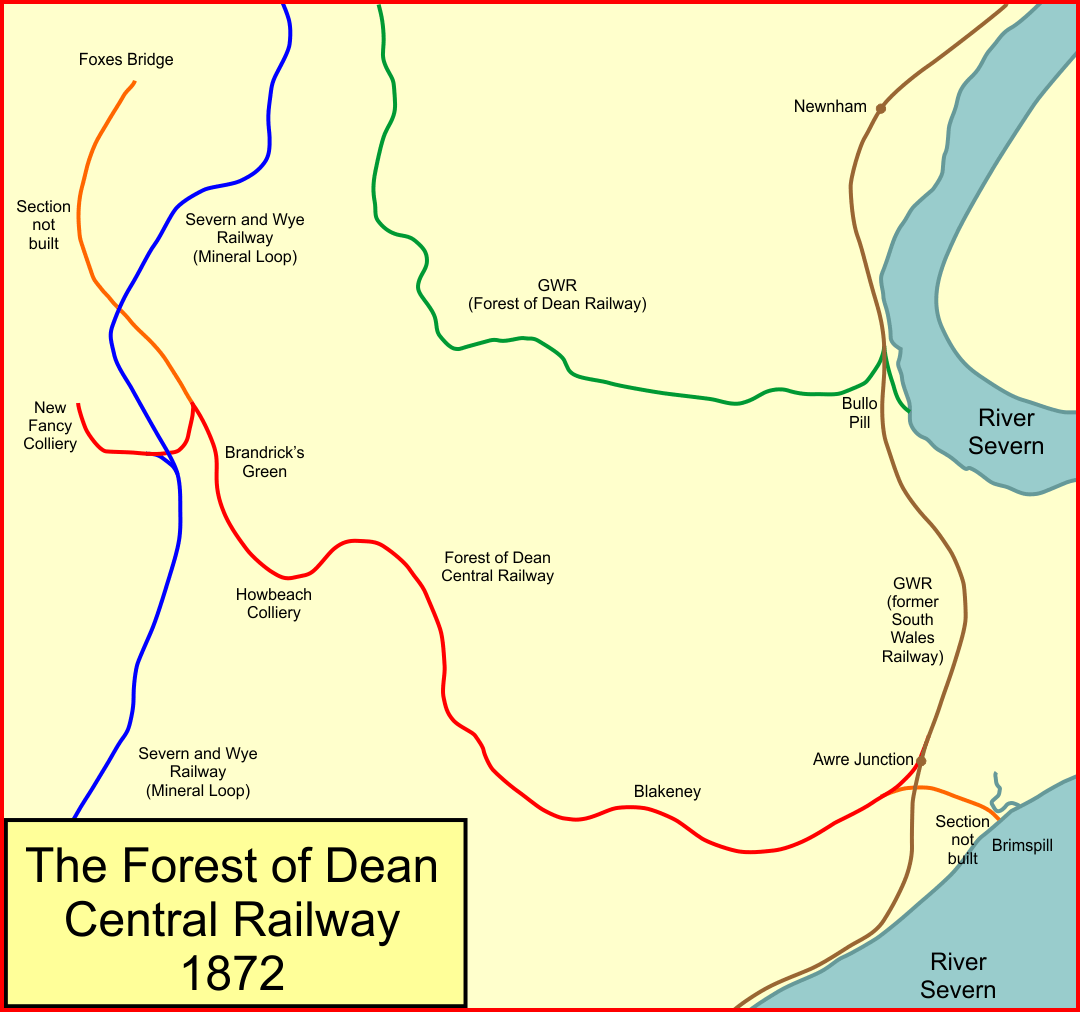
The Forest of Dean Central Railway in 1872

By 1830, tramroads were well established in the Forest of Dean for conveying the mineral products of the Forest to market. A coal mine was being developed at Foxes Bridge, about a mile east of Speech House, and the promoter Edward Protheroe proposed a "Steam Carriage Road", that is, a steam tramway to convey the output via Howbeach Slade to the Severn at Purton Pill, near the site of the later Severn Railway Bridge; it was to be about eight miles in extent.

The scheme was presented in Parliament in 1832 and some construction took place, but the line was never finished. A considerable number of proposals were put forward in the following years to construct a tramroad or railway from the area to the River Severn, but all failed to materialise.

In 1840 Edward Protheroe agitated to persuade the Severn and Wye Railway to construct a steam railway from Lydney up to Foxes Bridge, but the S&WR were not interested. In 1849 a similar line was proposed from Brimspill on the Severn to Howbeach Slade and Foxes Bridge; this did not go ahead, and a further scheme was put forward in 1850. This too failed.

The Commissioners of Woods were strongly in favour of these proposals, because they would promote improved railway facilities in the forest. The commissioners reported in 1852 that the existing railways were unsatisfactory and antiquated, and that the opening of the South Wales Railway and the conversion of the Severn and Wye Railway to an edge railway heralded a new era. The Forest of Dean Railway was mentioned, as was the necessity for a new railway to serve the central part of the Forest.

== The Forest of Dean Central Railway authorised ==
Heartened by the support of the commissioners, promoters put forward a bill in Parliament for the line; they included William Racster Wagstaff, Timothy Bennett and James Teague. The gauge was to be the same as that of the South Wales Railway, at that time broad gauge. Passenger traffic was provided for, though no such service was ever operated. However a toll of 2d per mile was stipulated for persons riding in road carriages conveyed on trucks. The Commissioners of Woods were authorised to subscribe £20,000 in instalments at 5 per cent interest. The company was entitled to borrow £21,660 on mortgage and the GWR advanced £15,000.

Forest of Dean Central Railway Act 1856
- Act of Parliament
- Parliament of the United Kingdom
- Long title: An Act for making a Railway from the South Wales Railway near Brimspill in the Parish of Awre to Howbeach Valley in the Forest of Dean, with Branches; and for other Purposes.
- Citation: 19 & 20 Vict. c. c

Dates
- Royal assent: 14 July 1856

Text of statute as originally enacted

The Forest of Dean Central Railway Act 1856 (19 & 20 Vict. c. c) received royal assent on 11 July. It was to run from Foxes Bridge Colliery to Brimspill, serving Howbeach Colliery on the way, with a branch line from New Fancy Colliery. The capital authorised was £65,000 in £10 shares. Brimspill is a tidal creek near Poulton Court on modern maps.

Much of the land was leased from the Crown at a rent of £100 a year, and the company was required to fence it throughout. It was decided that the sections from the South Wales Railway to New Fancy Colliery, and from Moseley Green to Foxes Bridge with the branch at Brimspill, should be built in two successive years. Plans were already being made for extending the line, and on 29 November 1856 an application was published for the Forest of Dean Central, Lydbrook & Hereford, Ross & Gloucester Junction Railway. This would extend the Forest of Dean Central Railway to the Hereford, Ross and Gloucester Railway line near Mitcheldean Road station, with a later extension to Ledbury. This was presented to Parliament in the 1857 session, but in fact no powers for the work were obtained. (In the 1870s a line was built on part of the intended route by the Mitcheldean Road and Forest of Dean Junction Railway.)

The engineer Richard B. Grantham considered various forms of permanent way and he recommended 100 lb per yard Barlow rail with cross sleepers at the joints, at a cost of £1,960 per mile. This system had proved fairly satisfactory on other lightly used lines, although gauge retention problems were beginning to be apparent.

The report of the first half-yearly meeting, on 28 February 1857, was optimistic. It was intended to complete the line to New Fancy Colliery Junction in Moseley Green by Christmas 1858, serving Howbeach Engine, Blackpool Engine and other collieries which were expected to be in a position to supply a large quantity of coal to the railway. The New Fancy Colliery was said to be in a forward state and would, when opened, afford large traffic. Grantham had received two tenders for construction of the line, one for £43,260 and the other for £47,500, excluding rails and sleepers. E. W. Morris, the contractor offering the higher estimate, secured the contract.

By November 1857 the harbour at Brimspill had been designed: the dock was to be about 176 yards by 154 yards and 22 feet deep at spring tides. Entry would be by a lock about 88 yards long.

In 1859 the confidence of the directors was such that they declared that "Since the line was projected, large coalfields have been got into working order, and consequently the expectations formed with regard to traffic has been so far realised." The coalfields referred to are difficult to identify, and at the time of this assertion the company's bank balance stood at £3.

== Raising the money ==
Forest of Dean Central Railway Act 1860
- Act of Parliament
- Parliament of the United Kingdom
- Long title: An Act to extend the Time for the Completion of the Forest of Dean Central Railway, and for other Purposes.
- Citation: 23 & 24 Vict. c. cxcix

Dates
- Royal assent: 20 August 1860

Text of statute as originally enacted

The raising of capital was slow, and after a brisk start, the financial position steadily deteriorated. Land was unobtainable for lack of finance, and progress slowed up. To save expense the company moved its office from London to Blakeney, and at the meeting there on 15 August 1858 it was reported that work had been suspended because many shareholders had not paid up their calls. In the following February the directors were able to obtain sufficient credit to permit Morris to resume work. During the session of 1860 the company applied for an extension of time until June 1862, which they received in the Forest of Dean Central Railway Act 1860 (23 & 24 Vict. c. cxcix), together with powers for the South Wales Railway to work the line when opened, and to make enhanced siding provision at Awre, where there was to be a junction with the SWR main line. The success of the South Wales Railway showed that onward transport of the mineral output from collieries on the Forest of Dean Central Railway might be by rail in preference to river movement. (Note: It is not clear from the sources whether a junction with the South Wales Railway was planned from the outset, or whether only river transport from Brimspill was intended at first.)

The report of 21 February 1860 stated that the first instalment of the loan from the Crown—£3,333 6s 8d—had been received and that the engineer's report was encouraging. The contractor had been delayed in building the embankment at Nibley by difficulties over possession of land, but a bridge over a mill stream was almost completed, and this would enable him to go ahead with the embankment. Bad weather had also held up work, but the company now owned the land down to the Severn, and the building of the bridge over the South Wales main line could proceed. Of the portion from Awre to Moseley Green, nearly 3 miles had been executed to formation level, as well as a small portion of the Brimspill branch.

Forest of Dean Central Railway Act 1861
- Act of Parliament
- Parliament of the United Kingdom
- Long title: An Act to enable the Forest of Dean Central Railway Company to construct further Works; and for other Purposes connected with their Undertaking.
- Citation: 24 & 25 Vict. c. clxxxiv

Dates
- Royal assent: 22 July 1861

On 24 August 1860 the directors complained of large arrears on share calls, but the contract for rails and sleepers had been let and they declared that they anticipated an early opening. They had been "induced by the engineer" to substitute iron girders for timber in the bridges, and this would involve an additional £1,000. The formation of the Brimspill branch was completed from the South Wales line to the Severn and the bridge over the main line was in course of construction. The heaviest works were the Blakeney embankment and Gilbert's Hill rock cutting. Powers to construct the dock at Brimspill, and further sidings at Awre Junction were secured by the Forest of Dean Central Railway Act 1861 (24 & 25 Vict. c. clxxxiv).

By December 1861 the directors were impatiently suggesting opening as much of the line as was ready, working it with horses, and changing to locomotives as soon as traffic warranted. On 4 February 1862 the engineer reported that the whole of the formation was completed, with the exception of the self-acting incline at the staith at Brimspill.

In June 1862 the contractor Morris stopped work altogether, as the financial difficulty of the company had resulted in him not being paid. The directors implied that this was his fault: "The position taken by Mr Morris renders it necessary to postpone the financial arrangements which would enable the directors to complete and open the railway without delay". Work had not even started on constructing the Brimspill dock, so it was obvious that if the line were to be opened early, the only outlet for the traffic would be the South Wales line. W. G. Owen, the engineer of the South Wales Railway, was asked to advise on the most economical junction arrangements for a limited mineral traffic, with accommodation for 20 to 30 wagons and strong enough for heavy engines. He estimated the cost at £5,603, and advised the company to arrange for the SWR to work the traffic to begin with.

Meanwhile, the trouble with Morris continued, the work was held up, and in 1863 he claimed £37,678 from the company. He was awarded £10,098 by an arbitrator and in April took legal action to obtain payment, but without success. Two years later he stated that he had received nothing since March 1861, and was owed about £40,000, adding that he had paid over £17,000 for his original shares. (Note: It was common at the time for undercapitalised companies to require contractors to accept part payment in shares. Paar comments that the company appears to have ruined Morris for, ten years later, he was reduced to a pathetic state of poverty, with little hope of ever recovering what was due to him.)

== Desperation to open the line ==
In June 1863 an engineer, Charles Bartholomew, was asked to go over the line and advise on what should be done to make possible an early opening. He reported that £7,308 would be required, and he was critical of the engineering of the construction work already carried out. He observed that three difficult and deep cuttings could easily have been avoided altogether, as each is quite close to the end of a spur round which the line could have been carried.

Further trouble arose when the Office of Woods threatened to resume possession of the Crown leases because rents were in arrears and fences had not been kept up. (Note: A condition of the Crown lease was that the affected land should be fenced immediately; the Commissioners of Woods attached great importance to this. However the FODCR was reluctant to spend its scarce cash on fencing wooded land remote from any habitation.) In fact the Commissioners of Woods carried the fencing out itself, and sent the bill to the FODCR; this may not have been paid for some time.

The financial situation of the company was extremely difficult and there was no prospect of it improving. There was only one way out: at a special general meeting on 27 February 1865 an agreement was approved with the Great Western Railway (with which the South Wales Railway had amalgamated in 1863), whereby the GWR should lease and work the line for 50 per cent of gross income. Any excess expenditure during the first three years would be made good to the GWR. The contractor Morris was to complete the railway within two months, for which payment was to be made to him by the GWR. This agreement was signed on 21 June 1866.

In February 1867 Owen reported that the bad winter had delayed work, but that the line would be completed in a month's time. After yet more delays the railway was ready at the end of June, when the GWR ran an engine on a trial trip throughout. The railway seems not to have been ready for immediate opening, however. Only two months later the county sheriff seized the line under a writ at the suit of the Crown for a debt of £1,339, and posted two men to prevent traffic from being worked. In February 1868 the GWR, having been unable to get this embargo removed, refused to work the line. As the railway was still unfinished—no further work had been done on the Brimspill branch and the line ended at the junction for New Fancy colliery—a further agreement was signed on 8 April under which the GWR was to complete the line.

== Opening at last ==
At length the GWR, having been indemnified against any legal action that might arise if they worked the railway, opened it for goods traffic on Monday 25 May 1868.

After the opening, a train ran on Mondays, Wednesdays and Fridays, leaving Awre at 11:10 and arriving at Howbeach at 11:35. Blakeney did not appear in the timetable until January 1870. The service terminated at Howbeach because the branch to New Fancy, although licensed by the Crown on 6 April 1868 to the Park End Coal Company, was not ready until early in 1869. The section northward from New Fancy Junction to Foxes Bridge was never completed. At the lower end, the final approach to Brimspill, east of the South Wales Railway was constructed but also never completed. (A short length of track appears to have been laid on it but not connected to the operational line.).

The only signal on the line, apart from that protecting the junction at Awre, was an old disc and crossbar at Howbeach on the south side of the line just within the rock cutting. This type of signal was not made after November 1869, so this must have been one of the last to be installed. It was still there in 1901 but had gone by 1921.

== The Mineral Loop of the Severn and Wye Railway ==
Meanwhile, the New Fancy branch was in danger of competition from the Severn and Wye Railway (S&WR), which was applying for powers to construct a new route to be called the Mineral Loop. This was to intersect the New Fancy branch and would be likely to abstract business, because of the superior shipping facilities at Lydney dock. The Forest of Dean Central Railway (FODCR) put up a spirited opposition to the S&WR proposal in Parliament but the S&WR obtained its act of Parliament, the Severn and Wye Railway and Canal Act 1869 (32 & 33 Vict. c. cxxxvii) on 16 July 1869. Its Mineral Loop was opened fully in April 1872. There was some difficulty over the intersection crossing with the New Fancy branch, as the latter was on a sharp curve with heavy superelevation and a steep gradient, and there was a slight level difference. Nonetheless, the S&WR and the FODCR reached a technical compromise.

== Gauge conversion ==
The Great Western Railway, as successor to the South Wales Railway, converted its main line and branches in the area to standard gauge between 11 May and 13 May 1872. The FODCR line was converted by the GWR at the same time, at the expense of the FODCR. The Barlow rails were removed and a better standard of permanent way was installed.

== Poor business ==
The commercial position of the FODCR was extremely poor; the fears that the Severn and Wye Railway's Mineral Loop would take away most of the New Fancy traffic proved correct. In connection with a possible extension of the line in 1879, it was stated by the Deputy Chairman that the Central line had not been in use since August 1875, as no collieries were working. The line was formally disused beyond Howbeach after 1877.

The desperate financial situation of the company was illustrated by solicitor's letter of 1877 which read, "I regret to say that the company does not possess sufficient funds to pay even the small expense of printing accounts, and none are therefore published". On 31 December 1884 the company owed the GWR £22,746 17s 10d, and the GWR even paid the rents due on leases. In 1885 negotiations for a renewal of the agreement ended with a letter from the FODCR secretary to the GWR, in effect begging the GWR to pay the Crown rent in order to keep the line available for future traffic.

The Ordnance Survey of 1901 showed that the track had been removed beyond the north-east corner of Brandrick's Green, and the stretch from Howbeach Colliery to Brandrick's Green was removed about 1911. Thereafter, the railway continued to function to Howbeach with three goods trains a week.

== After World War I ==
The coal strike of 1921 finished off Howbeach Colliery and traffic ceased beyond Blakeney about this time; the track beyond Blakeney remained in position, but was removed in 1942.

Because of the lease, the line had long been simply a quiet mineral branch line of the Great Western Railway; the Forest of Dean Central Railway owned the line but took no involvement in operating it, and the huge indebtedness meant that there was no dividend distribution. After World War I the government determined that the railways of Great Britain should be "grouped" into four large companies, under the Railways Act 1921. The Great Western Railway absorbed many small networks in its area of influence, and the Forest of Dean Central Railway was absorbed by the GWR from 1 January 1923. No shareholders could be traced, and the line was gifted to the GWR; it had spent £141,000 on the line.

During the Second World War, traffic was quite heavy because charcoal, a war material, was made in the Forest and there was a storage depot at Blakeney. After the war the traffic fell off and the last train ran on Friday, 29 July 1949, the line being officially closed from 2 August. The last engine was 0-6-0 pannier tank No. 2153. The track from Awre to Blakeney was used for condemned wagon storage for some years, the wagons being shunted up to Blakeney with gaps left at the occupation crossings, but the rails were lifted early in 1962.

== Route ==
From Awre the line climbed 1.75 miles (2.82 km) at 1 in 69 to Blakeney, where there was a goods shed. At 1 in 60 it crossed the main road, a 10-span viaduct, went through two deep cuttings, crossed the Roman road at Blackpool Bridge and another cutting to Howbeach Colliery. Beyond the line rose at 1 in 103, then 1 in 54 to New Fancy.

Note: Cobb shows the Forest of Dean Central Railway making a converging junction with the Mineral Loop of the Severn and Wye Railway, but this is a mistake. It crossed it, although both railways eventually had a connection to New Fancy Colliery.
