= Awre =

Village and civil parish in Gloucestershire, England

Coordinates: 51°46′N 2°26′W

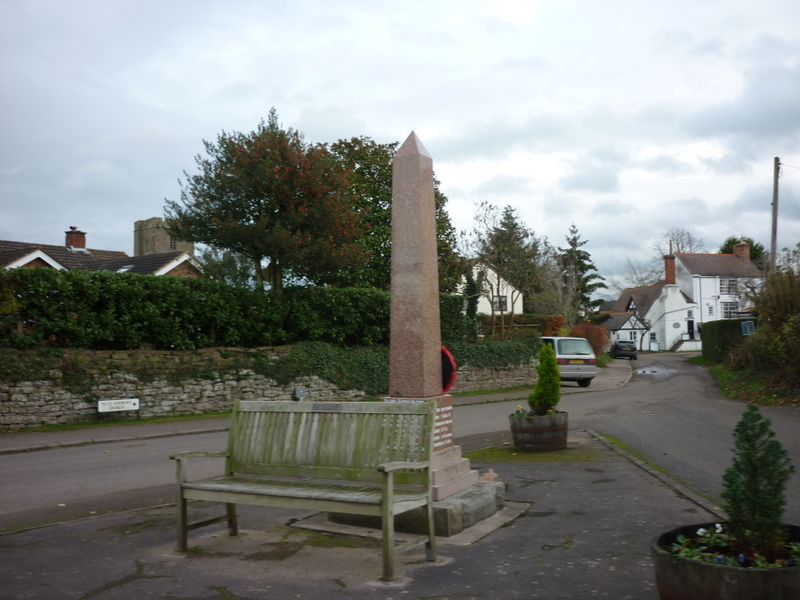
- The War Memorial at Awre

- Location within Gloucestershire
- Population: 1,714 (Civil parish, 2011)
- OS grid reference: SO7008
- Civil parish: Awre
- District: Forest of Dean
- Shire county: Gloucestershire
- Region: South West
- Country: England
- Sovereign state: United Kingdom
- Post town: Blakeney
- Postcode district: GL15
- Dialling code: 01594
- Police: Gloucestershire
- Fire: Gloucestershire
- Ambulance: South Western
- UK Parliament: Forest of Dean
- Website: Awre Parish Council home page

Awre (/ɔːr/) is a village, civil parish and electoral ward in the Forest of Dean District of Gloucestershire, England, near the River Severn.

Both the parish and the electoral ward include Blakeney, Etloe, Gatcombe, Viney Hill, and Two Bridges.

According to the 2001 census, Awre had a population of 1,644, increasing to 1,714 at the 2011 census. The electoral ward gives similar figures

== Name ==
A number of etymologies have been proposed for the villages name. A possible derivation from an Old Welsh word for yellow or golden has been suggested, linking the village to its location in the ancient Cantref Coch and the colour of the sandy soil in the upland areas around the village. Another suggestion is that the village was named for Gilbert de Awre, a Norman knight who is said to have come over during the Norman Conquest of England. However, the name de Awre does not appear under this name in contemporary texts, suggesting that he took his name from the village.

Today the name is commonly stated to derive from Old English; āfor "bitter or sour" and ēa "water-meadow or island" translating to "sour water-meadow".

== History ==
The manor of Awre is mentioned in the Domesday Book of 1086. Together with Lydney and Alvington, the parish of Awre comprised Bledisloe Hundred. Awre was a large parish which included the tithings of Blakeney, Bledisloe, Hagloe, and Etloe. The manors were often in royal hands or in possession of great medieval magnates. The whole of Awre parish was included within the jurisdiction of the Forest of Dean before 1228.

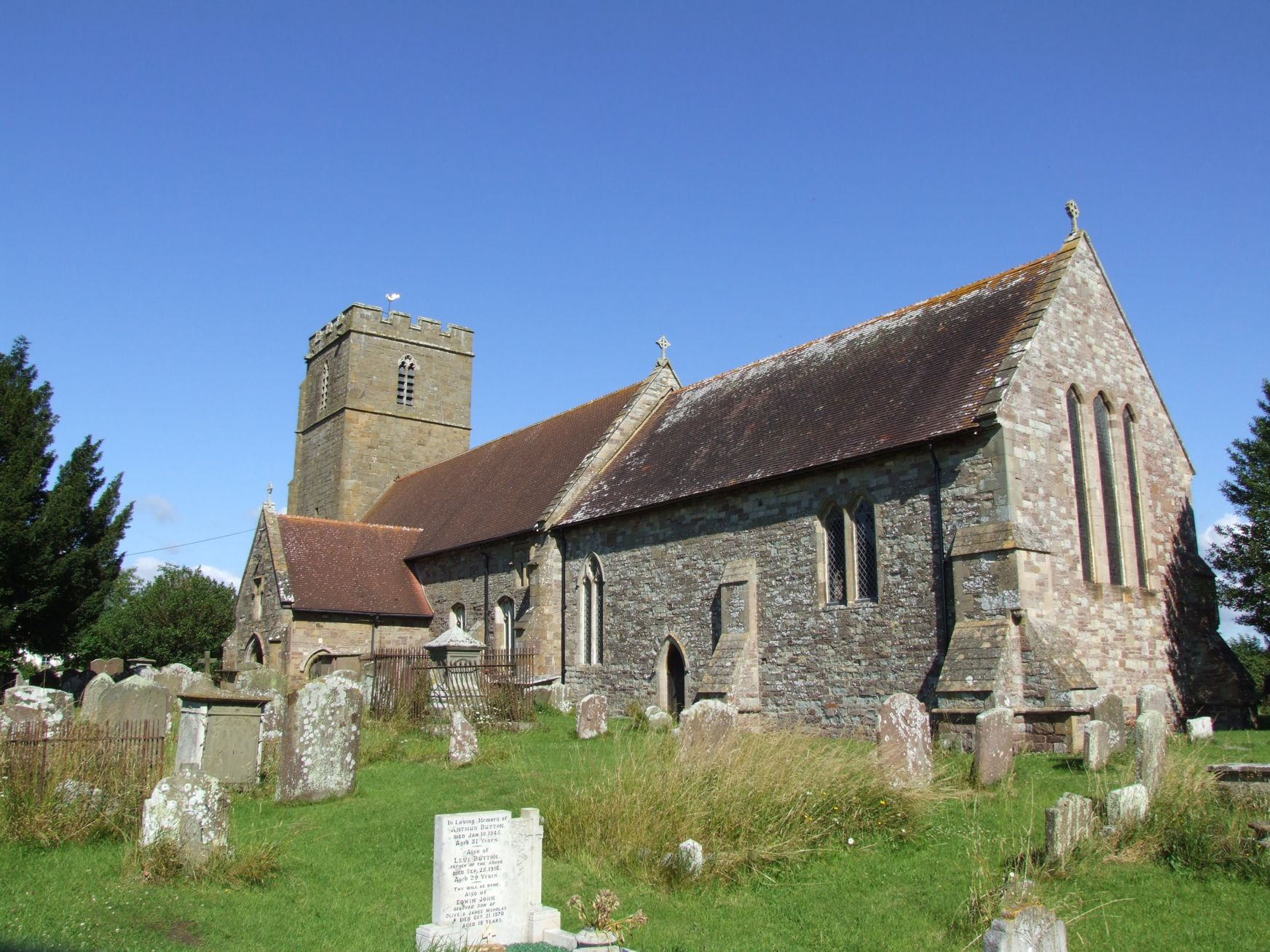
St Andrew's parish church from the southeast

The village was once larger, though probably always scattered in plan. In the 17th century, shipbuilding was established in nearby Gatcombe, once an important anchorage on the Severn. By the early 19th century, the industrial and trading village of Blakeney had replaced Awre as the principal centre.

A church is mentioned in Domesday Book, and by the mid 12th century it was dedicated to St. Andrew. It was rebuilt in the mid-13th century as a large building with a long chancel and a nave and north aisle of six bays. The porch was added in the 14th century and the upper part of the tower was reconstructed in the 15th century.

The church is a Victorian restoration of the 19th century with a 15th-century font and a 15th-century oak rood screen. A medieval dugout chest stands under the tower. The graveyard contains many burials of those drowned in the Severn as a result of shipwreck or other accident.

From 1851 to 1959, the area was served by the Awre for Blakeney railway station.

== Notable people ==
- Johannes Urzidil (1896–1970), the Prague born Bohemian German writer in exile lived with his wife, the poet Gertrude Urzidil, from 1939 till 1941 in Viney Hill and wrote in stories and essays about the Forest of Dean and the people living there.
