= Bledisloe Tump =

Coordinates: 51°46′16″N 2°27′36″W

Bledisloe Tump was a castle in the village of Awre in Gloucestershire, England.

== History ==
The first castle on the site was built in the 11th or early 12th century and was a simple timber structure. The site was chosen because it occupied a natural high point overlooking the River Severn. A later mound, 60 ft wide and 7 ft high was also constructed on the site, and it is suspected that this may have been an unfinished motte. It is possible that this was built during the period of the Anarchy in the 12th century, and one theory is that the castle was destroyed by Henry II after the conflict as part of a wider programme of castle denigration in Gloucestershire during the 1150s.

The site was later used for meetings of the local Hundred of Bledisloe, and another theory for the creation of the mound is that it was specifically made to support these meetings. A manor house, Bledisloe Manor, was later built on the site, and the remaining earthworks were destroyed during the 1970s.

== See also ==
- Castles in Great Britain and Ireland
- List of castles in England

== Bibliography ==
- Amt, Emilie. (1993) The Accession of Henry II in England: royal government restored, 1149-1159. Woodbridge, UK: Boydell Press. ISBN 978-0-85115-348-3.
- Steane, John M. (1985) The Archaeology of Medieval England and Wales, Volume 1985, Part 2. Beckenhem, UK: Croom Helm. ISBN 978-0-7099-2385-5.
