= Bradon Forest School =

Location
- The Peak; Purton, Wiltshire, SN5 4AT; England

Information
- Type: Academy
- Motto: Challenge, aspiration, respect, resilience, excellence. (CARE)
- Established: 1962
- Local authority: Wiltshire Council
- Department for Education URN: 142316 Tables
- Ofsted: Reports
- Head teacher: Sarah Haines
- Gender: Mixed
- Age: 11 to 18
- Colours: Blue, green, white
- Website: www.bradonforest.org.uk

Bradon Forest School is a mixed secondary school in Purton (near Swindon) in Wiltshire, England. In September 2015 the school converted to academy status and is now part of the Athelstan Academy Trust, which also includes Malmesbury School in Malmesbury, The Dean Academy in Lydney, Sir William Romney's School, Tetbury and Chipping Sodbury School. The headteacher of Bradon Forest School is Sarah Haines.

The school was established in 1962 as Bradon Forest Secondary School, initially with accommodation for 390 pupils. Its name reflects the Forest of Braydon which once covered the area. By 2016 there were 856 enrolled, increasing to 915 in October 2022.

The sixth form at Bradon Forest School runs in conjunction with Malmesbury School. Students attend lessons at Bradon Forest once a week and for the rest of the time they study at Malmesbury. Sixth form students are not required to wear a uniform.

Students at the school are able to study for GCSEs, A Levels, OCR Nationals and BTEC qualifications.

== Notable former pupils ==
Billie Piper attended the school for a short time before gaining a scholarship to a London theatre school; she went on to have hit pop singles and then a career in acting. Other former pupils include the footballers Matt Mills and former Swindon Town player Michael Pook, gymnast Laura Halford, swimmer Grant Turner and cricketer Craig Miles.
