= Allaston =

Village in Gloucestershire, England

Coordinates: 51.73°N 02.53°W

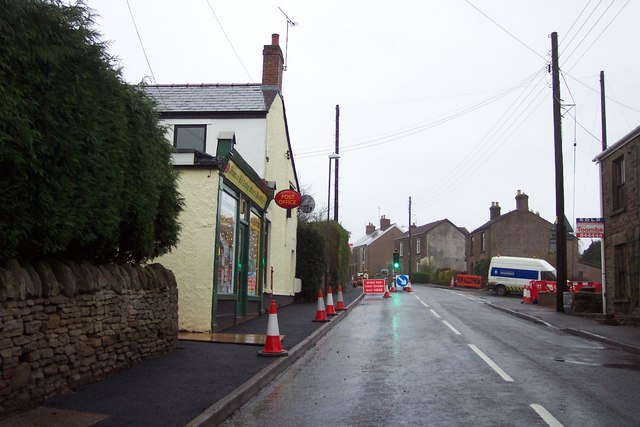
- Primrose Hill Post Office

- Location within Gloucestershire
- OS grid reference: SO6304
- Civil parish: Lydney
- District: Forest of Dean
- Shire county: Gloucestershire
- Region: South West
- Country: England
- Sovereign state: United Kingdom
- Police: Gloucestershire
- Fire: Gloucestershire
- Ambulance: South Western

Allaston is a hamlet in Gloucestershire, England, now forming part of the town of Lydney.

Allaston was mentioned in the Domesday Book, when it was part of Bledisloe Hundred.
