= Awre for Blakeney railway station =

Disused railway station in Blakeney, Gloucestershire

Coordinates: 51.76068°N 2.44894°W

Awre for Blakeney

General information
- Location: Blakeney, Gloucestershire, Forest of Dean; England

Other information
- Status: Disused

History
- Original company: South Wales Railway
- Pre-grouping: Great Western Railway
- Post-grouping: Great Western Railway

Key dates
- 19 December 1851: Station opened
- 10 August 1959: Station closed
Location

Awre for Blakeney railway station is a closed railway station in Gloucestershire, England, which served both the village of Awre and the town of Blakeney.

== History ==
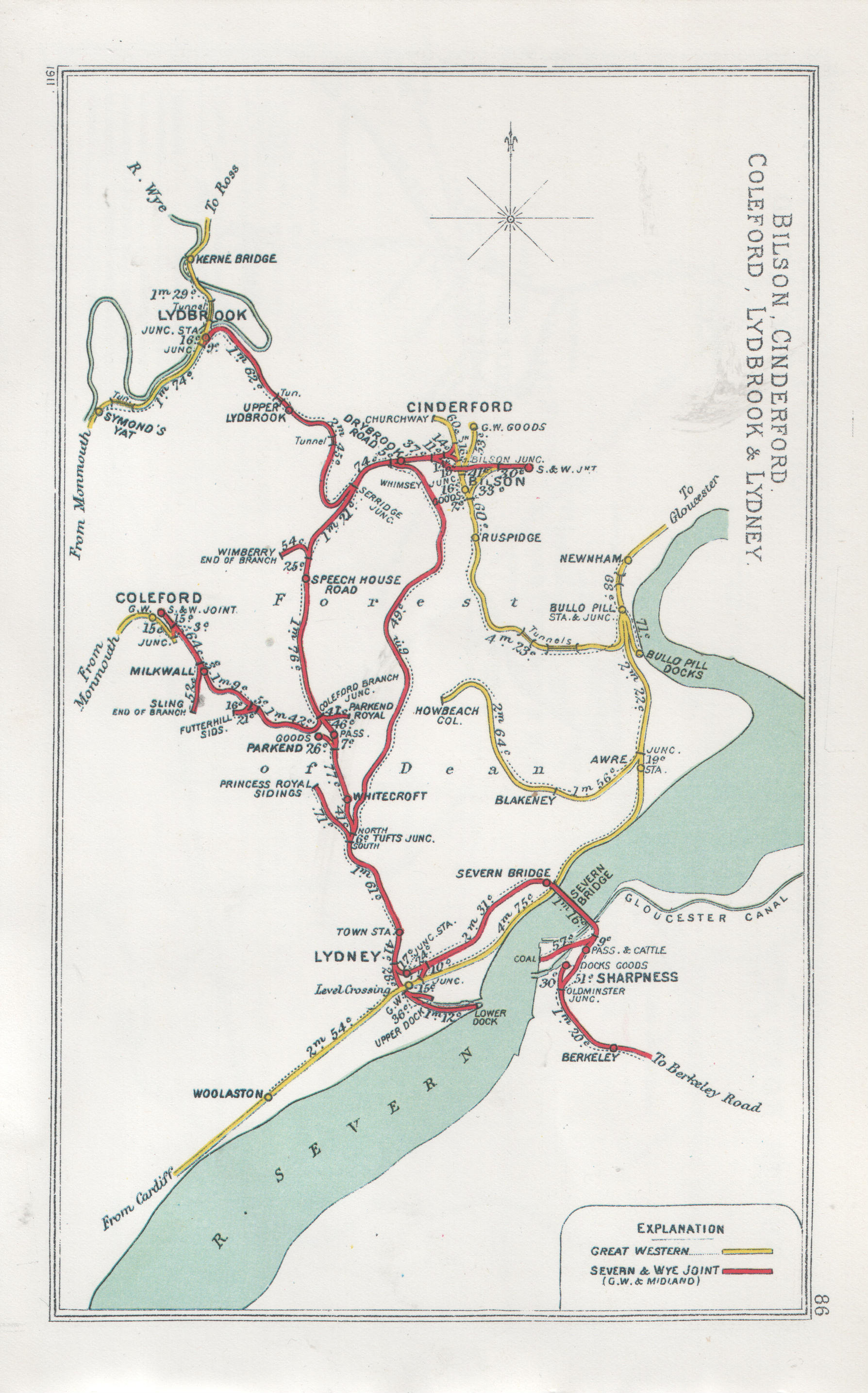
A 1911 Railway Clearing House map of railways in the vicinity of Awre

Opened by the South Wales Railway, the station was amalgamated into the Great Western Railway and this in turn was nationalised into British Railways on 1 January 1948. From 1868, it was a junction for the freight-only Forest of Dean Central Railway, and it was sometimes shown in timetables as "Awre Junction". The Forest of Dean line closed in 1949, though it was used as a siding to store wagons for some years afterwards. Awre station was closed to passenger and goods traffic in 1959, though a coal depot remained open until 1961.

== The site today ==
Trains still pass the site on the Gloucester to Newport Line.

Preceding station	Historical railways	Following station
Newnham; Line open station closed	Great Western Railway; South Wales Railway	Lydney
Newnham; Line open station closed	Great Western Railway; Forest of Dean Central Railway	Blakeney; Line and station closed
