= Pidcock's Canal =

Former canal in Gloucestershire, England

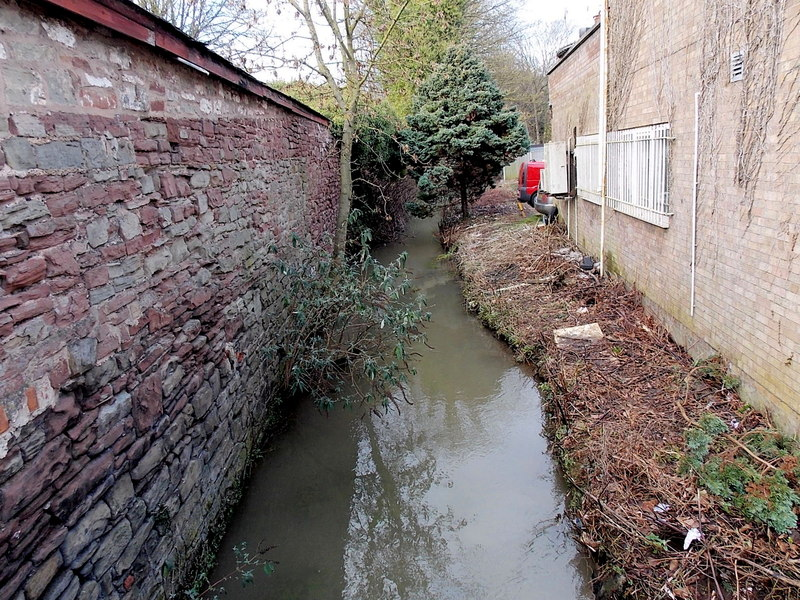
- The remains of the Cut, to the north of Hill Street, Lydney

Specifications
- Locks: 3
- Status: parts extant

History
- Date of first use: 1780s
- Date closed: 1840

Geography
- Start point: Middle Forge
- End point: Lydney
- Connects to: originally Lydney Pill; Lydney Canal from 1813

Pidcock's Canal was a canal in Gloucestershire, England, which connected ironworks at Upper Forge and Lower Forge, and also ran to an inlet from the River Severn called Lydney Pill. It was constructed from 1778 onwards, and there were three locks below Middle Forge. Following the construction of the Lydney Canal in 1813, the canal connected to that, rather than Lydney Pill, and it was disused after 1840, by which time a horse-drawn tramway had been built up the valley of The Lyd. The tramway was eventually relaid as a steam railway and is now preserved as the Dean Forest Railway. Most of the canal, colloquially called The Cut, still exists below Middle Forge.

== History ==
Large parts of the parish of Lydney were organised as an estate, which had been managed by the Bathurst family since 1723. The estate contained mineral reserves, and they profited from this by building ironworks. The Lower Forge ironworks were supplied with water by several streams, which were augmented by a long leat which left the Newerne stream near the Chepstow road.

In 1775, David Tanner from Tintern was granted a lease of the Upper Forge, on the northern borders of Lydney. A new 99-year lease was negotiated in 1778, which included powers to construct a canal from there to the Lower Forge. It is known that the canal had been built by 1790, although the precise date of construction is unknown. Tanner sold his lease in 1789, and in 1790 it was sold again to members of the Pidcock family, who were glassmasters from Staffordshire. The Pidcocks managed the forges until 1813, when the lease was sold back to the Bathursts. They also had coal mining rights, and transported coal to Lydney Pill using the canal. On surrender, the lease covered the Upper and Middle Forges, the Lower Forge and rolling mill, the White Cross furnace, and the canal, which had by then been extended to Lydney Pill. John James took on the lease from 1814, building another forge at New Mills in the 1820s, and using the Lower Forge as a tinplate works from 1844. In 1889, Richard Thomas, who had leased the works from 1876, made improvements to the Lower Forge tinplate works, and the remaining works were stripped and abandoned.

The Lydney and Lydbrook Railway (tramway) was authorised by an act of Parliament the Lydney and Lidbrook Railway Act 1809 (49 Geo. 3. c. clix). This became the Severn and Wye Railway and Canal in 1810 and construction of a tramway and canal to Lydney Harbour commenced in the same year. The tramway ran parallel to Pidcock's Canal as it followed the course of the Newerne Valley, crossing it twice on drawbridges. Pidcock's Canal fell into disuse in the 1840s.

== Route ==
The canal started at the Upper Forge, and ran close to the Newerne stream, also called The Lyd. The lower section took a more direct route to the Lower Forge, using the course of the leat which had supplied the works with water. There were three locks near the Middle works. The canal crossed the Chepstow road between Lydney and Newerne, and the branch from the Lower Forge to Lydney Pill was quite short.

The route diagram shows the waterways as they existed in 1880. The Upper Forge, New Mills and Middle Forge all had extensive ponds upstream of the works, contained by stone dams. Once the canal closed, the ponds covered its route between Upper Forge and Middle Forge. Ordnance Survey maps for the period show weirs and sluices at the downstream ends of the ponds, and the central one at Middle Forge appears to feed the canal. By 1880 there was no obvious route around the dams, and there is no mention of locks to allow boats to move between levels. As on modern maps, the canal was known as The Cut at the time. From the Lower Mill, the canal formerly ran to Lydney Pill, but the waterways were altered as a result of the construction of the Lydney Canal. The 1880 map shows two channels below the Lower Mill, one clearly joining the bottom of The Lyd, before it discharges into the Lydney Canal, and the other running from the reservoir on the upstream side of the works to a wide basin near the Lydney Canal, but with no obvious connection between them. Halfway along this section is a small branch which ends just to the south of Station Road Cottages.

== Points of interest ==
Point	Coordinates (Links to map resources)	OS Grid Ref	Notes
Upper Forge	51.7421°N 2.5447°W	SO624049	
New Mills	51.7377°N 2.5380°W	SO629044	
Middle Forge	51.7316°N 2.5350°W	SO631037	
Newerne Street bridge	51.7263°N 2.5318°W	SO633032	
Lower Forge reservoir	51.7164°N 2.5363°W	SO630020	
Junction with The Lyd	51.7130°N 2.5312°W	SO633017	

== See also ==
- Canals of Great Britain
- History of the British canal system

== Bibliography ==
- Currie, C R J; Herbert, N M, eds. (1996). A History of the County of Gloucester: Volume 5: Bledisloe Hundred, St. Briavels Hundred, The Forest of Dean. Victoria County History. British History Online.
- Hadfield, Charles (1967). The Canals of South Wales and the Borders. David and Charles. ISBN 978-0-7153-4027-1.
- Paget-Tomlinson, Edward W. (2006). The Illustrated History of Canal & River Navigations. Landmark Publishing. ISBN 978-1-84306-207-3.
