= Bledisloe Hundred =

Former administrative division of Gloucestershire, England

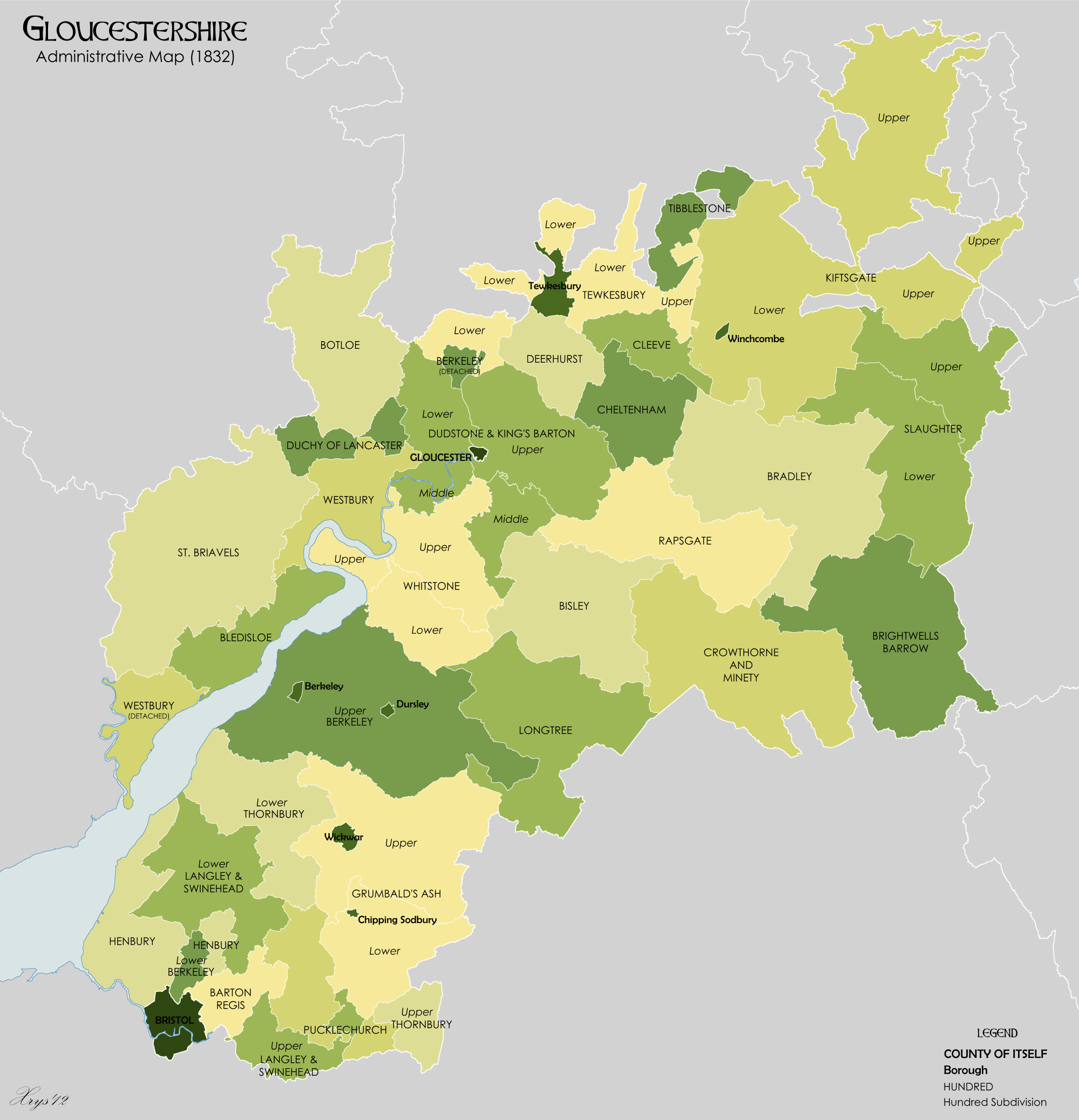
Gloucestershire Hundreds in 1832

Bledisloe was an ancient hundred of Gloucestershire, England. It comprised the ancient parishes of

- Alvington
- Awre
- Lydney

== History ==
The hundred was originally part of the Cantref Coch, an ancient Welsh land division (cantrefi) but became known as Blideslow and Blideslau in English. The hundred is named after the hamlet of Bledisloe. It was once a tithing of the parish of Awre and now a hamlet north of Lydney on the A48 road, where the hundred met. The meeting place was a mound known as Bledisloe Tump. The second element clearly derives from the Old English "-hlǣw" meaning tumulus, burial mound or barrow. William Lewis states that this barrow was that of one Blīþe deriving the name from "Blīþe's Barrow".

At the time of the Domesday Book, the hundred included Awre manor, Bledisloe, Etloe, Purton and Nass. Alvington (previously a detached part of Herefordshire) and Lydney joined the hundred by 1221.
