= Malmesbury School =

Location
- Corn Gastons; Malmesbury, Wiltshire, SN16 0DF; England
- Coordinates: 51.5857°N 2.1100°W

Information
- Type: Academy
- Trust: The Athelstan Trust UID: 3831
- Department for Education URN: 137308 Tables
- Ofsted: Reports
- Chair of Governors: Tamsyn Luggar
- Head Teacher: Brett Jouny
- Gender: Mixed
- Age: 11 to 18
- Enrolment: 1,428 (May 2023)
- Houses: Athelstan, Eilmer, Hobbes, William
- Colours: Green, Yellow, Red and Blue (house colours, in order from Athelstan to William)
- Website: www.malmesbury.wilts.sch.uk

Malmesbury School in Malmesbury, Wiltshire, England, was founded in 1971 with the merger of Malmesbury Grammar School at Filands with Bremhilam Secondary Modern at Corn Gastons.

== History ==
Until 2002, the school operated on two sites, with the lower school (years 7 and 8) at Filands and the upper school (years 9 to 13) at Corn Gastons. In 2002, the school moved into new buildings on the Corn Gastons site, funded by a public-private partnership between the local authority and the White Horse Education Partnership. The new building was formally opened by polar explorer David Hempleman-Adams on 2 May 2003.

In 2008, Malmesbury School became a foundation school. In 2011 it became an academy.

In 2014, the school introduced a new grey and black uniform for years 7–11, which featured a tie in the house colours.

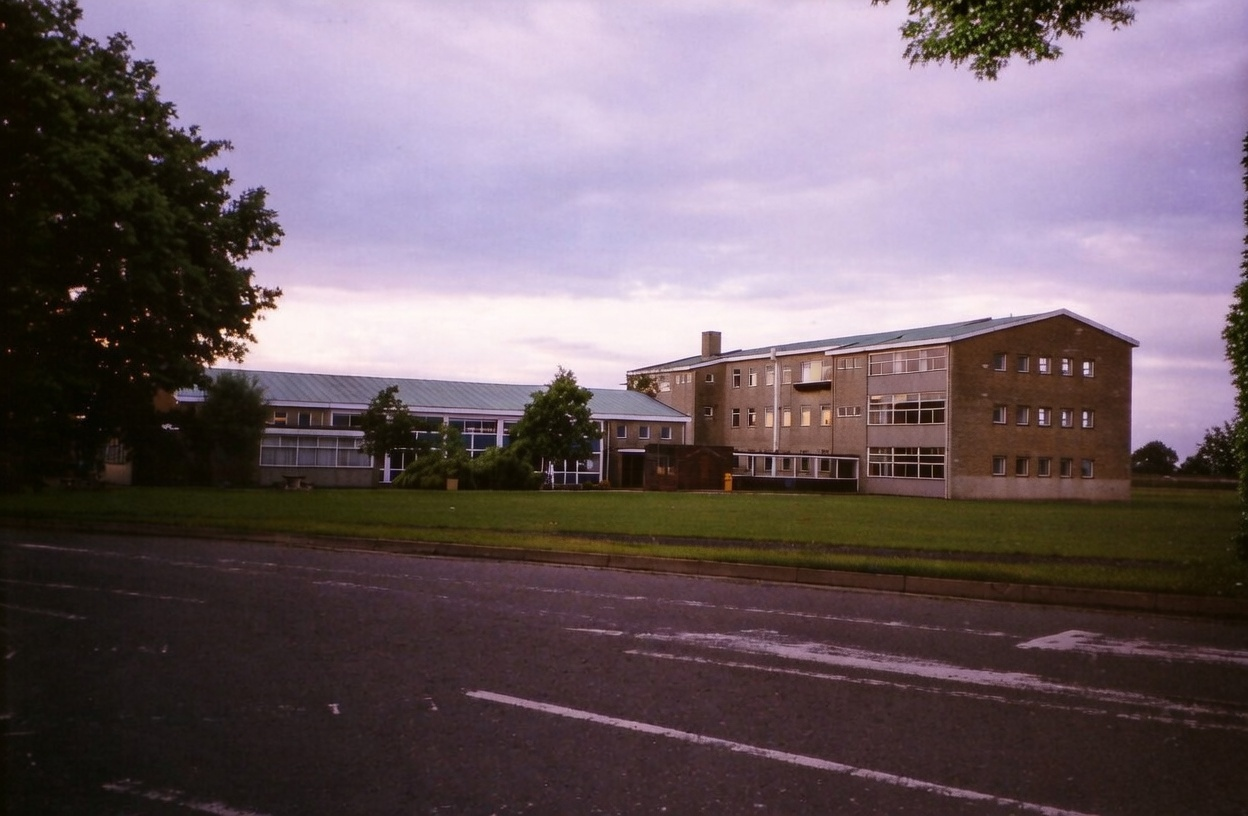
Malmesbury Lower School, Filands (since demolished)

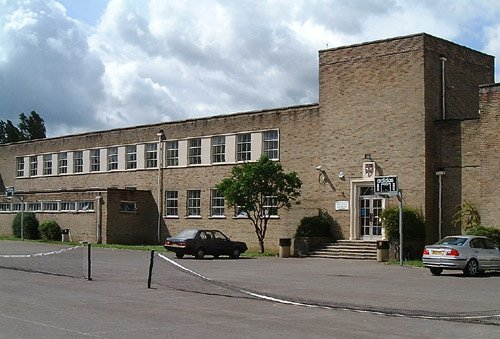
Malmesbury Upper School, Corn Gastons, in 1995 (since demolished)

== Awards and specialisms ==
In 2004 Malmesbury School became a Specialist School for Science and Performing Arts, earned High Performing Specialist School status in 2008, and was awarded a second specialism in Maths and Computing in 2009.

== The Athelstan Trust ==
In March 2015 The Dean Academy in Lydney, Gloucestershire became sponsored by Malmesbury School Academy Trust, and the Trust was renamed The Athelstan Trust. Bradon Forest School in Purton, Wiltshire joined the Trust in September 2015, and Sir William Romney's School in Tetbury, Gloucestershire, joined in April 2020. Chipping Sodbury School joined the Trust in April 2021.

== Houses ==
The school has four houses, Athelstan, Eilmer, Hobbes and William, named for local heroes:

- King Athelstan, the first King of England (Green)
- Eilmer of Malmesbury, the 12th-century flying monk (Yellow)
- Thomas Hobbes, the 17th-century Philosopher (Red)
- William of Malmesbury, the 12th-century monk, historian and author of Gesta Regum Anglorum (Blue)
