= Lydney power station =

Former coal-fired power station in Gloucestershire, England

- Country: England
- Location: Lydney Gloucestershire
- Coordinates: 51°44′06″N 02°32′18″W
- Status: Decommissioned and demolished
- Construction began: 1922
- Commission date: 1923
- Decommission date: 1967
- Construction cost: £235,000
- Owners: West Gloucestershire Power Company Limited (1922–1948); British Electricity Authority (1948–1955); Central Electricity Authority (1955–1957); Central Electricity Generating Board (1958–1967)
- Operator: As operator

Thermal power station
- Primary fuel: Coal
- Turbine technology: steam turbo-alternators
- Cooling towers: 2
- Cooling source: River water plus cooling towers

Power generation
- Units operational: 2 × 5 MW 1 × 70.5 MW
- Make and model: Bellis-Parsons, Bellis-ASEA
- Nameplate capacity: 17.5 MW
- Annual net output: 50.6 GWh (1937)

The Lydney power station supplied electricity to 300 square miles (780 km^{2}) of West Gloucestershire, England from 1923 until 1967. The supply area included the Forest of Dean, Stroud and Nailsworth. The station was owned by the West Gloucestershire Power Company Limited prior to the nationalisation of the British electricity supply industry in 1948. The station was closed in 1967.

== History ==
=== West Gloucestershire Power Company Limited ===
The Norchard Syndicate Limited was established in 1921 to build a central power house to supply 300 square miles (777 km^{2}) of West Gloucestershire including the coal fields of the Forest of Dean and industries in Stroud and Nailsworth. Norchard is a location in the Lyd Valley. In 1921 the Syndicate applied to the Electricity Commissioners for permission to undertake the electricity scheme. The sanction was given by the commissioners in September 1921.

The syndicate changed its name to the West Gloucestershire Power Company Limited, which was incorporated on 23 March 1922. With a capital of £235,000, work started on the construction of the power house at Lydney (51°44′06″N 02°32′18″W) in 1922. The company raised further capital of £600,000 by the issue of stock and shares in June 1924.

Key personnel of the company in 1924 were:

- J. Davidson (Chairman)
- R. M. Horne-Payne (Director)
- D. Northall-Laurie (Director)
- Harry S. Ellis (General Manager and Chief Engineer)
- Arthur Ellis (Advisory Committee)
- William B. Woodhouse (Advisory Committee)

The company installed generating equipment in the power station as outlined below. The plant generated and ‘sent out’ the quantities of electricity shown in the table below. There is an aerial view of the power station in 1929.

The sale of electricity generated an income and profit for the company.

Year	Net profit	Gross earnings from revenue
1928	–	£60,321
1929	–	£80,307
1933	£46,785	–
1934	£51,367	–
1935	£70,604	–
1936	£76,245	–
1937	£81,820	–
1938	£89,385	–
1939	£95,932	–

The British electricity supply industry was nationalised in 1948 under the provisions of the Electricity Act 1947 (10 & 11 Geo. 6. c. 54). The West Gloucestershire Power Company Limited electricity undertaking was abolished, ownership of Lydney power station was vested in the British Electricity Authority, and subsequently the Central Electricity Authority and the Central Electricity Generating Board (CEGB). At the same time the electricity distribution and sales responsibilities of the West Gloucestershire Power Company Limited were transferred to the South Wales Electricity Board (SWEB).

== Equipment ==
The principal equipment installed at Lydney power station was:

- 3 × Stirling boilers 40,000 lb/h (5.04 kg/s) steam conditions 260 psi at 650 °F (17.93 bar at 343 °C)
- 1 × Stirling boilers 35,000 lb/h (4.41 kg/s) steam conditions 260 psi at 650 °F (17.93 bar at 343 °C)

The total evaporative capacity of the boilers was 155,000 lb/h (19.53 kg/s), these supplied steam to:

- 2 × 5 MW Bellis-Parsons turbo-alternators, generating electricity at 6.6 kV. One commissioned March 1923, the second was commissioned in May 1923.
- 1 × 7.5 MW Bellis-ASEA turbo-alternator, generating electricity at 6.6 kV. This was commissioned in June 1929.

The output capacity of the station was 10 MW.

The station was supplied with coal via a siding off the adjacent railway line.

Cooling of the condenser was by water drawn from the River Lyd there was one wooden and one concrete cooling tower. They had a capacity of 0.95 million gallons per hour (1.2 m^{3}/second).

== Operations ==
Operating data over the lifetime of the power station was as follows:

Lydney power station operating data 1925–67
Year	Running hours or load factor (per cent)	Max output capacity MW	Electricity supplied GWh	Thermal efficiency per cent
1925	–	–	7.160	–
1926	–	–	7.423	–
1928	–	–	10.947	–
1929	–	–	13.263	–
1937	–	–	50.573	–
1938	–	–	50.477	–
1946	27.8 %	–	36.007	12.89
1947		15.7	40.364	13.22
1948	4819	14	40.132	13.91
1950	4955	15	43.207	13.38
1954	4455	10	24.014	12.80
1955	4639	10	30.406	13.52
1956	3449	10	19.947	12.87
1957	2644	10	13.661	12.31
1958	1146	10	5.364	10.90
1961	2.3 %	10	2.047	9.49
1962	1.5 %	10	1.348	8.88
1963	6.64 %	10	5.813	11.32
1967	9.28 %	10	4.141	9.28

The rise and fall of electricity generation at Lydney power station in GWh

Lydney power station was closed in 1967 and was later demolished.

== See also ==
- Timeline of the UK electricity supply industry
- List of power stations in England
