= Lydney Town Hall =

Municipal building in Lydney, Gloucestershire, England

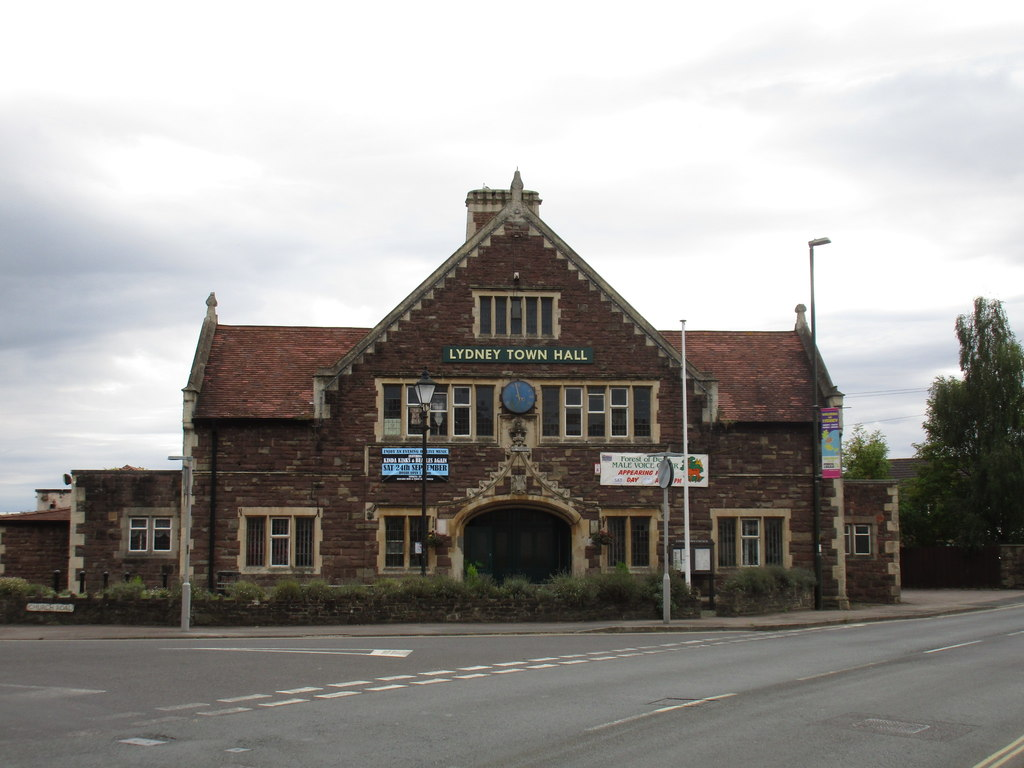
- Lydney Town Hall

- Shown in Gloucestershire
- 51.7231°N 2.5380°W
- Location: High Street, Lydney

History
- Built: 1889

Site notes
- Architect: William Howard Seth-Smith
- Architectural style: Jacobethan style

Lydney Town Hall is a municipal structure in the High Street, Lydney, Gloucestershire, England. The structure, which is used as an events venue, is listed by the local authority as a "building of local architectural or historical interest".

== History ==
In the 1880s, following significant population growth associated with the town's role as a port for the shipment of coal and timber, a group of local businessmen decided to form a company to finance and to erect a town hall. The land selected for the new building, which was to the immediate south of the market cross, was donated by the lord of the manor, Charles Bathurst (1837–1907) of Lydney Park.

The foundation stone for the new building was laid by the benefactor's son, Charles Bathurst (1867–1958), on 15 December 1888. It was designed by William Howard Seth-Smith in the Jacobethan style, built in rubble masonry and was officially opened by the benefactor's daughter, Mary Bathhurst, in September 1889. The design involved a symmetrical main frontage with five bays facing onto the corner of the High Street and Church Road; the central section of three bays, which was gabled, featured a recessed doorway with an ogee-shaped stone surround flanked by two-light mullioned windows. On the first floor there were two five-light mullioned windows and on the second floor there was a single five-light mullioned window. The outer bays were fenestrated on the ground floor by three-light mullioned windows and the gable was surmounted by a finial. Internally, the principal room was a large assembly hall with a sprung dance floor.

After the area became a rural district in 1894, the new rural district council chose to make the town hall its main meeting place in 1898. The building was used as a Red Cross Voluntary Aid Detachment auxiliary hospital for wounded service personnel during the First World War and it was used as an ARP control centre during the Second World War.

The town hall continued to serve as the local seat of government until the rural district council moved to purpose-built council offices in 1956: ownership of the building was then transferred to a board of trustees in 1957. The assembly room continued to be used for public events and performers there included the rock band, The Beatles, who gave a concert in August 1962. In 1968, ownership of the building passed to the parish council which, following local government reorganisation in 1974, became known as Lydney Town Council.
