= White Cross Manor =

Manor house in Lyndey, Gloucestershire, England

Coordinates: 51.723°N 2.535°W

White Cross Manor was the manor house in Lydney, Gloucestershire, England, of the Wynter family. It was burnt to the ground in April 1645 on the orders of Sir John Wynter to avoid it being taken over by the Parliamentarians during the English Civil War.

White Cross Manor was where Edward Swarthye, a Black man, is recorded as whipping John Guye.

Another manor house, Lydney House, was later built at the other end of its grounds.
