= Cantref Coch =

Medieval cantref in Gloucestershire

Coordinates: 51.79°N 2.54°W

Cantref Coch: Welsh: Cantref Coch
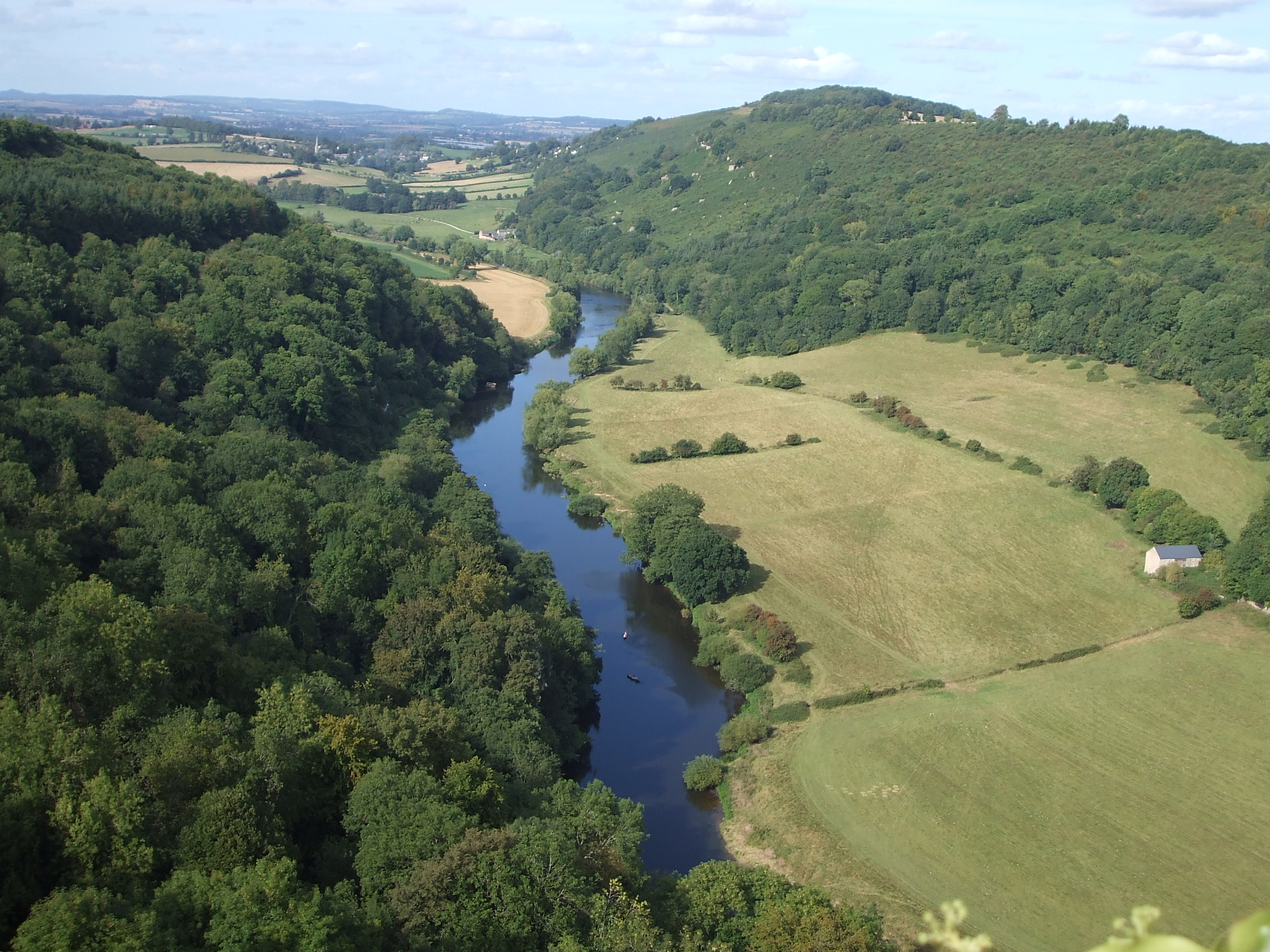
- Cantref Coch's western boundary along the River Wye
- Region: South West
- Country: England
- Sovereign state: United Kingdom

Cantref Coch (Welsh pronunciation: [ˈkantrɛ(v) koːχ] transl. The Red Cantref) was an area associated with the ancient kingdoms of Ergyng, Gwent and the later Kingdom of Glamorgan. Cantref Coch is linked with the modern Forest of Dean and is defined as the land between the River Severn and the River Wye, with the Severn Sea as its southern border although its northern border is less certain. It is one of the few medieval cantrefi named by Welsh writers that is not within the modern nation of Wales.

== History ==
=== Early history ===
The area that would become Cantref Coch was home to native Iron working activities for sometime before the arrival of the Romans. However, the area may have been highly contested between the local Silures tribe and its neighbours, as evidenced by the paucity of numismatic finds.

=== Roman era ===
The Roman era would see Cantref Coch pacified, and even become a center of religious and industrial activity, as well as the location of an important road (the Via Julia Maritima) from Glevum into South Wales. During this period, the production of iron ore and charcoal increased rapidly, which would have strengthened the areas links with the administrative centre for these industries at Ariconium.

The community at Ariconium existed prior to the Roman invasion and was home to a number of ancient bloomeries, suggesting preexisting trade links with Cantref Coch. However, these links were greatly improved when the Romans introduced the bellows, making Ariconium a very wealthy and powerful community. This power would in turn have led to it becoming a powerful local kingdom after the departure of Roman forces. However, Ariconium itself seems to have been suddenly abandoned shortly after 360 AD, with local traditions recorded in the 19th century stating that the town was destroyed by an earthquake, leaving the resource rich successor state in much turmoil.

=== As part of Ergyng ===
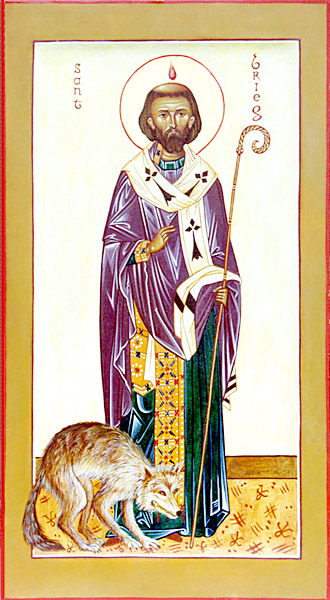
The 5th century Welsh saint Brioc, gave his name to a number of toponyms in the area.

It is generally thought that Ariconium was a latinisation of an existing British Celtic name, and that the post-Roman polity of Ergyng represents a continuation of Pre-Roman or Romano-British culture. Cantref Coch may naturally have formed part of the Kingdom of Ergyng as it emerged in the fifth century, but it remained far from the kingdom's heartland in Herefordshire. Furthermore, the turmoil following the sudden abandonment of Ariconium may have resulted in almost a decade of widespread marauding as reported by Ammianus.

As such the area would once again have been highly contested as Ergyng's fortunes changed for the worse. It is very likely that Saint Brioc would have been active in the cantref during the fifth century, as the later Hundred of St Briavels, St Briavels parish and St Briavels Castle are all named for the saint.

=== As part of Gwent and Glamorgan ===
Although historical records of Ergyng and its cantrefi remain scarce, Cantref Coch would be better recorded in Medieval Welsh literature, as well as by later Cambro-Norman writers and British antiquarians.

In the sixteenth century Humphrey Llwyd names Cantref Coch as the "seventh cantref of the Kingdom of Glamorgan, now in Gloucestshire, and is called the Forest of Dean". Other writers such as Richard Blome describe it as one of the three cantrefs of the Kingdom of Gwent, "the Cantref Coch, now in Gloucestershire and called the Forest of Dean". Mark Willett described the cantref as one of four that comprised Gwent.

Iolo Morganwg called Cantref Coch the third part of the kingdom of Iestyn ap Gwrgant, separating it from both Gwent and Morgannwg proper (Glywysing). Iolo gives a fuller description of the Cantref's extent under Iestyn, stating that it stretched "from the Wye and Severn, up to the bridge at Gloucester, and from there to Hereford", making the Cantref much larger than any of the English hundreds or the area now considered the Forest of Dean.

Iolo states that the land was acquired through Iestyn's second wife Angharad, the daughter of "Elystan Glodrydd" whom Iolo describes as "king of the Cantref Coch." This lineage is not supported by the more established Welsh genealogies, none of which mention the marriage. It may be that Iolo made use of Elystan as he was in fact, "king of the Rhwng Gwy a Hafren" (the land between the Wye and the Severn). However, the areas commonly referred to as Rhwng Gwy a Hafren was located further north in Powys, rather than in the locality of the Cantref Coch.

=== Later history ===
According to William of Malmesbury, Æthelstan met with a number of Welsh kings in Hereford in 926, and the border between the Kingdom of Gwent and the Kingdom of England was agreed at the Wye, removing Cantref Coch from Gwent's historic boundaries. However, Edward Stradling recorded that in the time of Edward the Confessor (1042-1066), Griffith the fourth son of Iestyn ap Gwrgant became Lord of Caerleon, and that his Lordship comprised the cantrefi of Gwynllwg, Gwent isa and Cantref Coch.

It also appears that some of the ancient links between the area and Gwent continued well into the Norman period. Secular and ecclesiastic holdings would continue to be transferred between local leaders and the Lordship of Caerleon or other institutions in Gwent. As late as 1244, the Lord of the Bledisloe hundred confirmed an ancient claim by Llanthony Priory that its tenants in the manor of Alvington were exempt from suit to the hundred.
