= Alvington, Gloucestershire =

Coordinates: 51.70515°N 2.57562°W

Alvington
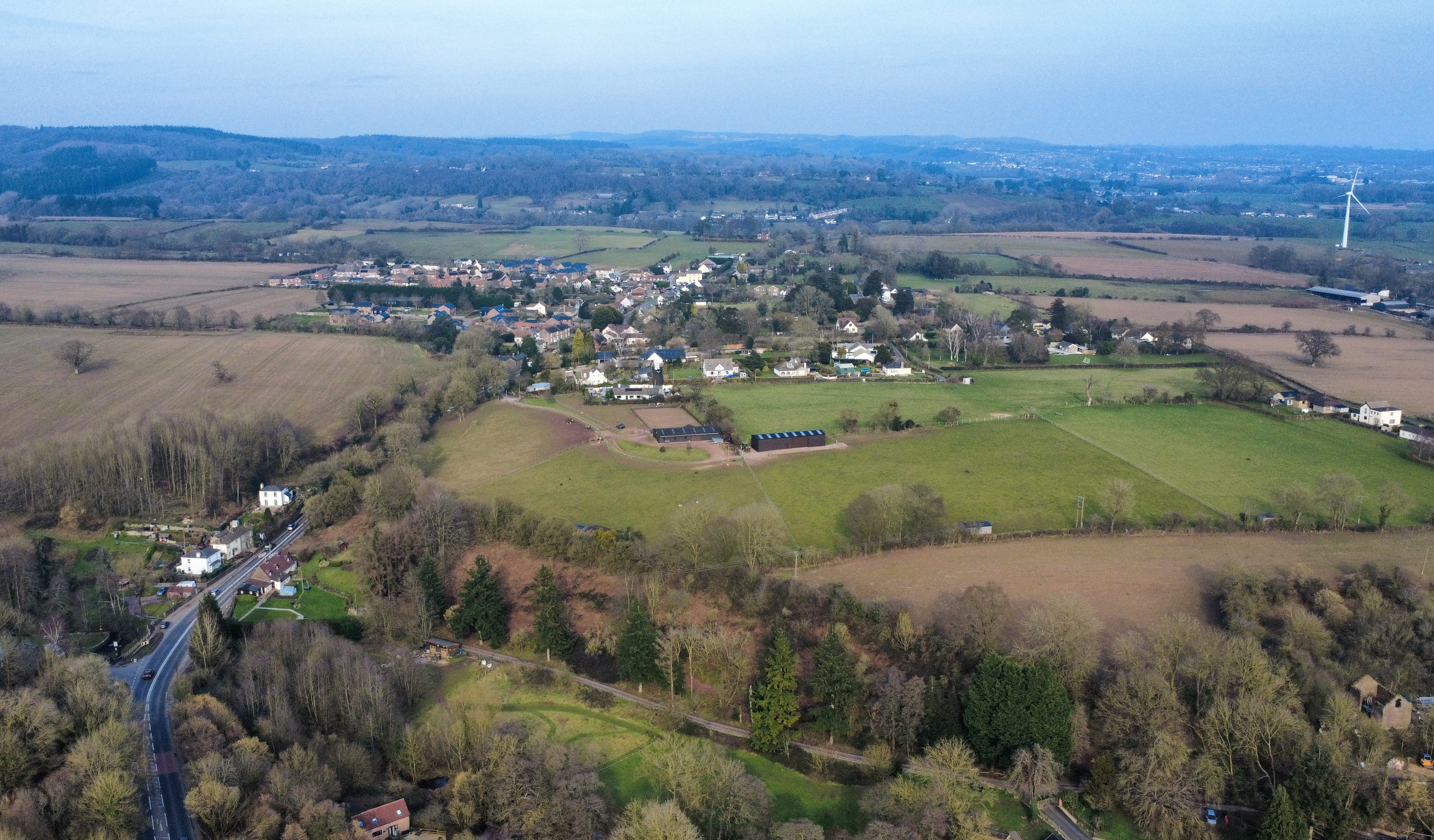
- Alvington, looking northeast.

- Location within Gloucestershire
- OS grid reference: SO603008
- Civil parish: Alvington
- District: Forest of Dean
- Shire county: Gloucestershire
- Region: South West
- Country: England
- Sovereign state: United Kingdom
- Post town: Lydney
- Postcode district: GL15
- Police: Gloucestershire
- Fire: Gloucestershire
- Ambulance: South Western
- UK Parliament: Forest of Dean

Alvington is a village and civil parish in the Forest of Dean in Gloucestershire, England, situated on the A48 road, six miles north-east of Chepstow in Wales. The parish had a total population of 506 at the 2011 census.

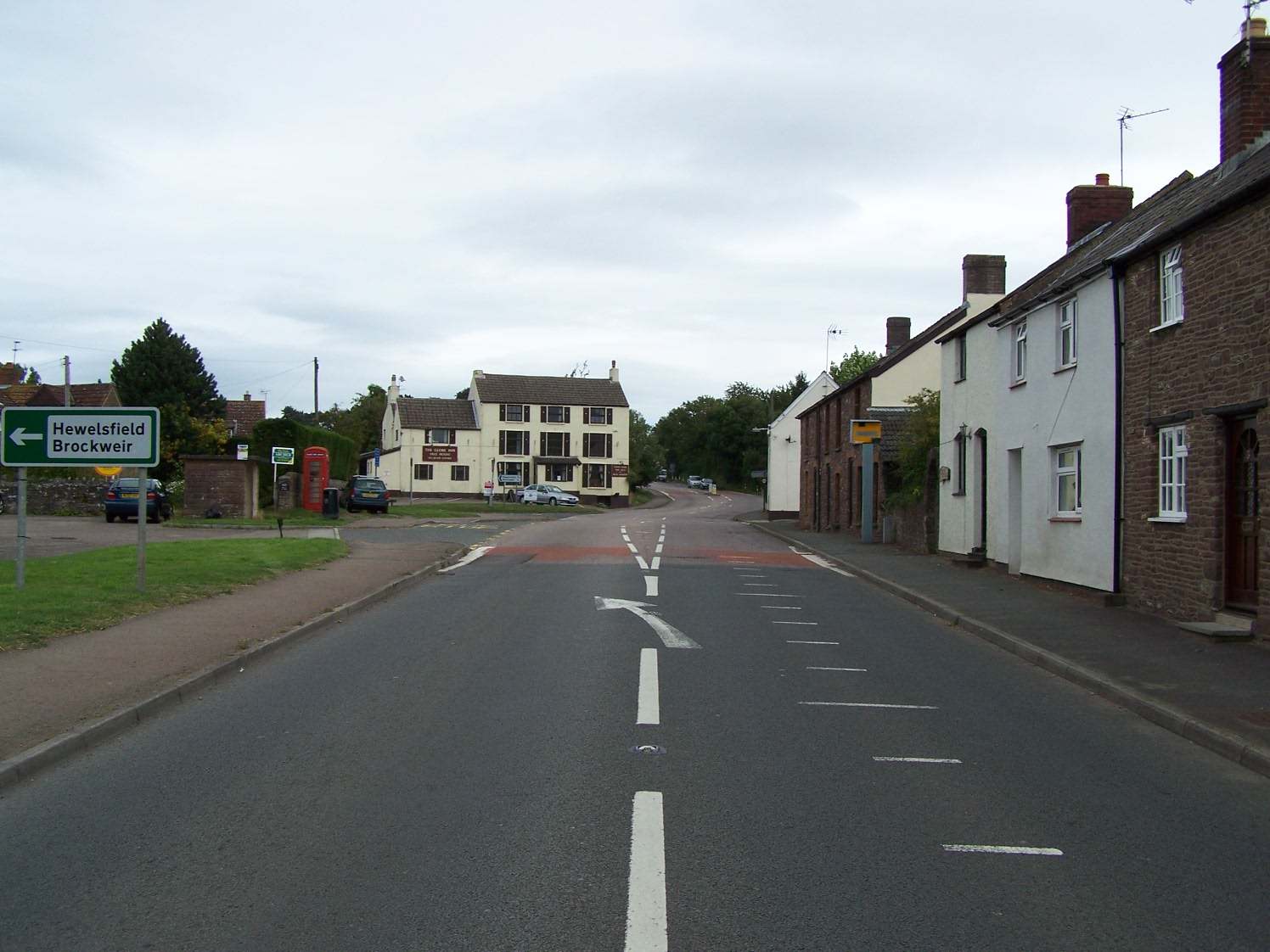
A48 road through Alvington

== History ==
Alvington was one of a number of hamlets dotted along the River Severn, following the former Roman road leading from Newnham on Severn to Chepstow. The manor of Alvington is recorded in the Domesday Book of 1086 under the name ‘Alwintune’, then part of the Herefordshire hundred of Bromsash, held by Turstin FitzRolf. During the 12th century, Alvington joined Gloucestershire as part of the Bledisloe hundred, and became a separate parish. In 1145, Walter of Hereford granted ownership of Alvington parish and manor to Llanthony Priory (in Gloucester). The Priory was dissolved in 1539. The lord of the manor's seat was situated in Clanna Falls around one mile from the village. In its history Alvington, has variously boasted two smithies, a small brewery, a small engineering works and several shops.

== Society and amenities ==
Alvington's population had varied somewhere between 300 and 500 since the mid-19th century. During the 1960s the development of a council estate increased the size of the village. The village lies at the edge of the Forest of Dean, which was once an important coal-producing area. There is a strong agricultural influence in the village today, although historically this would have been more evident and many of the population now work outside of the village and its immediate surroundings.

There used to be a village school in Alvington dating back to around 1850, however the last remnants of what became Alvington Church of England School closed in 1958.

Today, Alvington has little in the way of shops and villagers have to travel to the nearby town of Lydney for most services beyond those served by the local petrol station, which acts as the village shop. There are three public houses in Alvington: The Blacksmith's Arms; The Globe Inn (which reopened in November 2014); and The Swan Inn (currently closed but having renovations). The Globe Inn dates back to around 1805. The Blacksmith's Arms dates back the late nineteenth-century in a building that was formerly a smithy (hence the pub's current name). The Swan Inn (now the Swan House Tea Rooms) lies on the border of Alvington and neighbouring Woolaston (also classed as Colne Valley), and once contained a mill in its early days.

== St. Andrew’s church ==
Built by Llanthony Priory around 1140, the church was originally named St. Mary's, until it took its current name of St. Andrew’s in 1523. In 1858 the church underwent substantial restoration leaving only one small Norman architecture window to reveal its Norman origins. St. Andrew's, Alvington is in the Parish of Woolaston and Alvington, in the Deanery of Forest South under the Diocese of Gloucester. St. Andrew's, Alvington is found on Church Lane and a village hall was built nearby in 1924.

== Transport ==
Alvington lies on the A48 road, which runs from Chepstow in Monmouthshire, Wales, to Gloucester, England. The nearest railway stations can also be found in Lydney (on local trains from Gloucester) and Chepstow on more regular national routes. The Stagecoach West number 24 bus serves the village on its Chepstow to Cinderford route from Mondays to Saturdays.

== Politics ==
Alvington is represented by the county councillor for Tidenham division and the two district councillors for Alvington, Aylburton and West Lydney ward in the Forest of Dean District Council. The Forest of Dean is represented in Parliament by Matt Bishop MP (Labour Party).

== Sport ==
Alvington and Woolaston Cricket Club was founded in 1983, originally playing at Woolaston Primary School, they now play their home fixtures in Alvington. The club competes in the K. W. Bell Forest League and the Forest Mid-Week League.

Alvington Football Club reformed in 2024 after almost 50 years under the name Alvington Star FC, headed up by Stuart Lodge and Tom Vincent along with Russell Robinson. The team's home kit is currently amber and black striped shirts with black shorts and black socks, and their away kit is white and green squared with green shorts and green socks. Their home pitch can be found at Alvington Playing Fields in Court Lane., where teams currently change in converted shipping containers in the far corner of the field, which is shared with the Cricket Club. Plans to build a new multi-use facility are almost complete and, subject to remaining funds being collected, the facility is expected to be built in the next few years. In their first season, Alvington Star made the quarter-finals of the County Cup losing narrowly 1-0 on the day. Their main rivals are local neighbours Woolaston.

== Paranormal activity ==
The village has been at the centre of a number of paranormal claims in recent years. In 2009 local resident David Crook claimed to have spotted bright lights in the sky above the playing fields. The lights burned brightly in the sky to such an extent that David rushed into the village, knocking on doors, to warn local residents. The lights turned out to be a child up a tree with a torch. But David to this day still claims it was aliens.
