= Lydney Canal =

One-mile canal in Gloucestershire, England

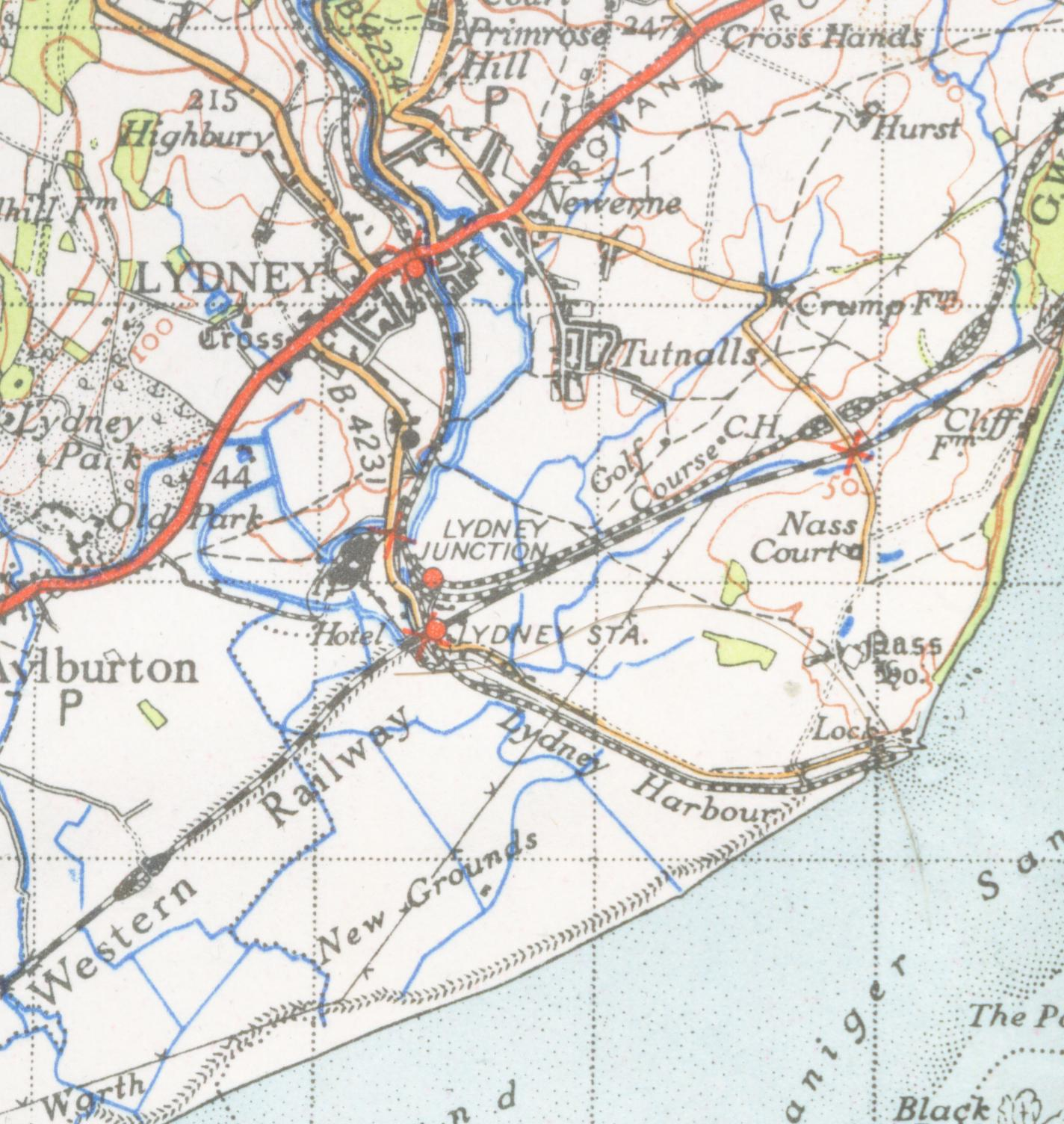
1946 OS Map

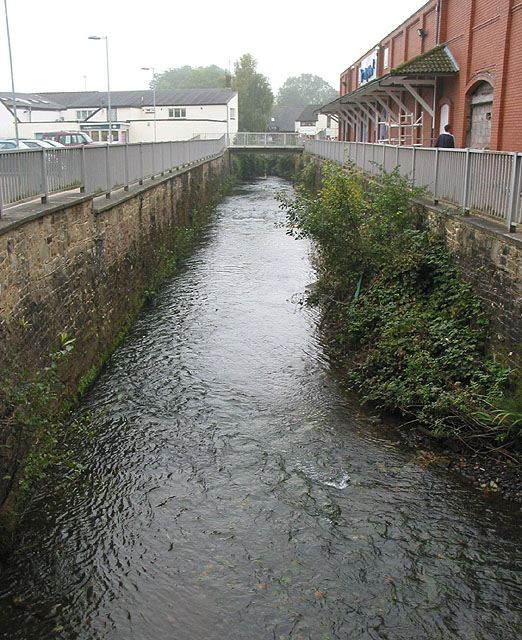
River Lyd approaching its confluence with the Severn via the canal.

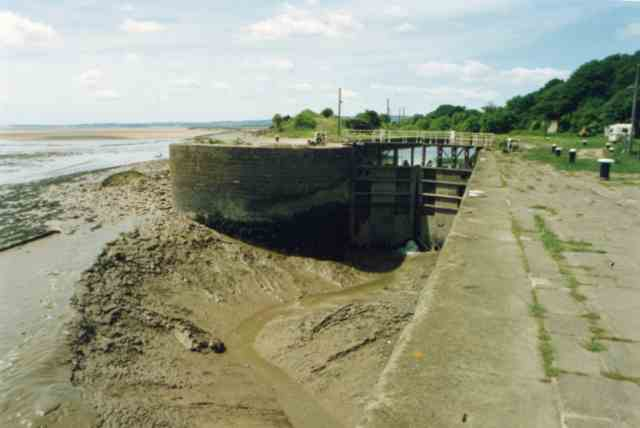
The tidal entrance gate

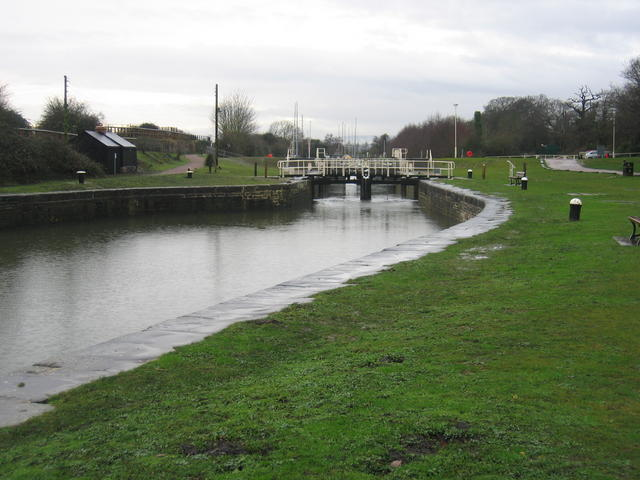
The semi-tidal entrance basin

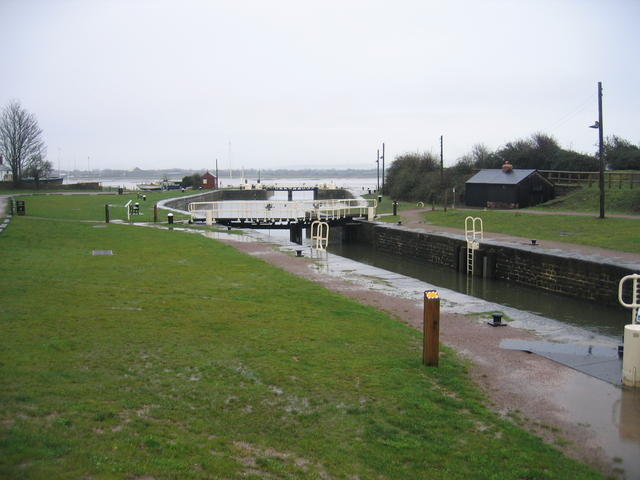
The lock

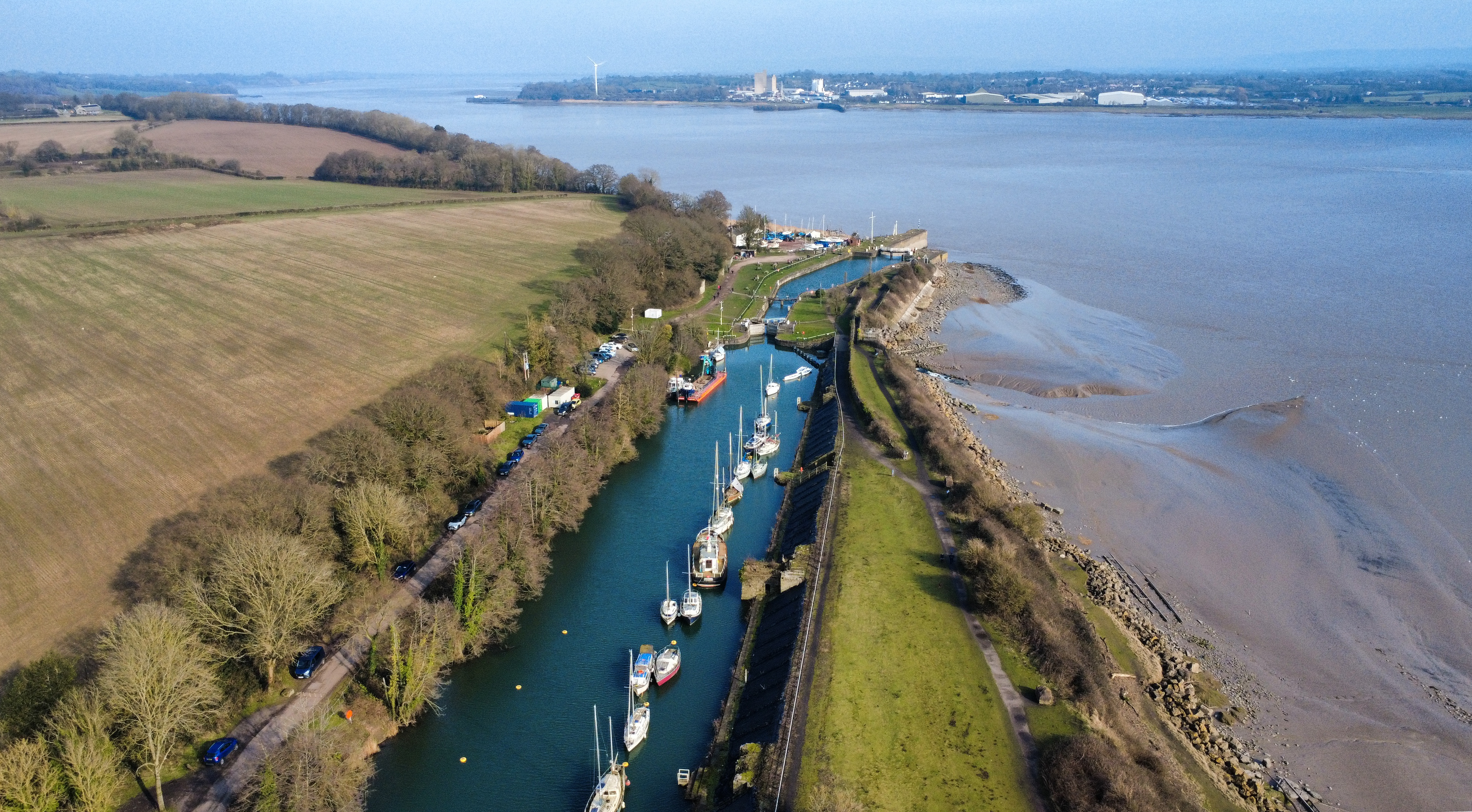
The harbour in 2025 from the swing bridge, showing new stones and art installations.

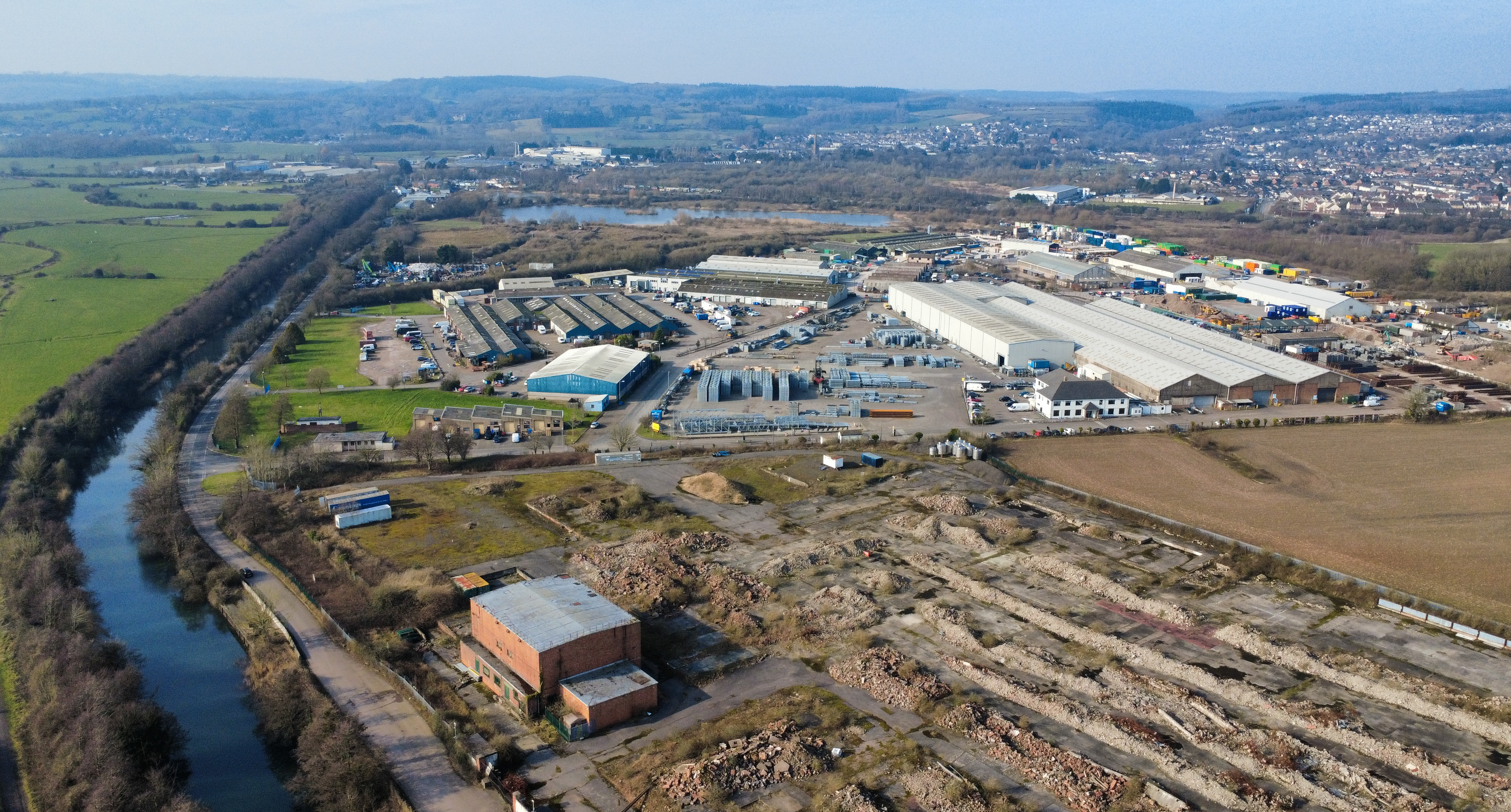
The harbour (canal) and Lydney Harbour Estate

The Lydney Canal is a one-mile canal in Gloucestershire that runs inland from the River Severn to Lydney. It was opened in 1813 to trans-ship iron and coal from the Forest of Dean. It was once connected by a horse-drawn tramroad to Pidcock's Canal which brought materials down to the wharves by tub-boat.

In the 1960s imported wood was still being brought in by barge from Avonmouth. It remained in commercial use until the 1980s. The entrance to the canal consists of an outer tidal gate opening into a wide basin. From there a lock opens into the one-mile canal cut. Immediately above the lock, a pair of gates points the other way as protection against a high tidal flood in the estuary. There is one swing bridge across the canal.

The docks were restored between 2003 and 2005, using money from the Heritage Lottery Fund and others, to create a marina and harbour area for seagoing yachts and motor boats. Despite dredging, both the inner and outer lock gates became stuck at times due to more silt. The harbour was declared tidal by the Environment Agency in 2015. An Environment Agency-backed plan to restore the harbour area, dredge the silt, refurbish the sea gates and implement the 'Destination Lydney Harbour' project began in 2020 to make the area a visitor attraction. Artists were engaged to create sculptures by the shore and the A48 road, a visitor hub and café were installed and the access road resurfaced. The 11-metre steel sea gates were removed in April 2023, refurbished in Bridgend and reinstalled in September the same year. The silt build-up was dredged from the tidal basin and the harbour walls renovated. The next stage, to focus on the piers, new pontoons, safety and access improvements was scheduled to begin in spring 2026.

== Timeline ==
- 1809 – The Lydney and Lidbrook Railway Act 1809 (49 Geo. 3. c. clix) enabled construction of a tramroad from Lydbrook to Lydney.
- 1810 – A second act, the Severn and Wye Railway and Canal Act 1810 (50 Geo. 3. c. ccxv), changed the company name to the "Severn and Wye Railway and Canal Company" and (amongst other things) authorises the building of the canal to the River Severn at Nass Point.
- 1810 – Josias Jessop (son of William Jessop) was appointed consulting engineer and designed plans for the canal.
- 1811 – Thomas Sheasby (son of Thomas Sheasby senior) was taken on as resident engineer.
- 1813 – The canal was opened by the Severn and Wye Railway and Canal Company.
- 1821 – The outer harbour was completed and the tramway extended all the way down.
- 1825 – The north pier was extended to aid ships' passage into the harbour.
- 1868 – The tramway was converted to broad gauge.
- 1872 – Converted to standard gauge.
- 1893 – Severn and Wye Railway and Canal Company went bankrupt.
- 1894 – Purchased by the Great Western and Midland Railways and administered by a Joint Committee of the two companies.
- 1948 – The railway and docks passed to the Western Region of the Railway Executive on nationalization.
- 1950 – Transferred to the Docks and Inland Waterways Executive.
- 1960 – The last coal was shipped from the harbour.
- 1977 – The harbour was closed.
- 1985 – The section from the swing bridge to the Severn was scheduled as an ancient monument
- 1988 – The swing bridge was scheduled as a Grade II listed building.
- 1996 – The Environment Agency took over management of the docks.
- 1997 – Inner gates collapsed and were replaced by a dam to reduce flood risk.
- 1998 – The Lydney Docks Partnership was established to create a sustainable future for the canal.
- 2005 – Re-opened after a two-year project of restoration and enhancement.
- 2015 – The harbour was declared tidal by the Environment Agency.
- 2020 - 'Destination Lydney Harbour' commenced to make the harbour a better tourist attraction.
- 2022 - Harbour-themed art trail completed by Denman and Gould.
- 2023 - Lock gates repaired and reinstalled.

== See also ==
- Canals of Great Britain
- History of the British canal system
