= Lydney Park =

Country estate in Gloucestershire, England

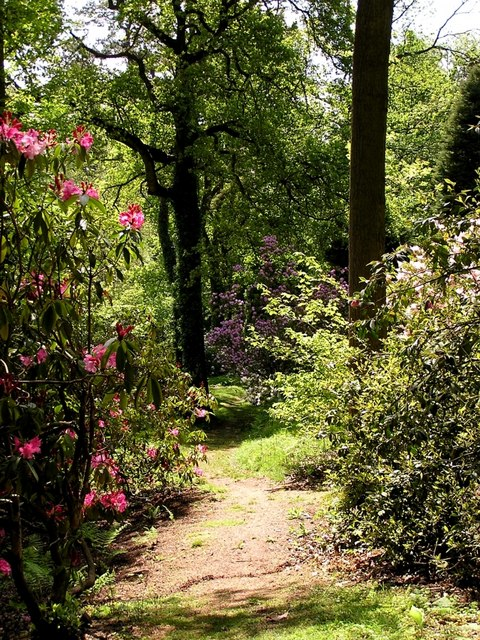
- Lydney Park Gardens

- Location in Gloucestershire
- 51°43′14.52″N 02°33′11.52″W
- Location: Lydney, Gloucestershire, England

Lydney Park is a 17th-century country estate surrounding Lydney House, located at Lydney in the Forest of Dean district in Gloucestershire, England. It is known for its gardens and Roman temple complex.

== House and gardens ==
Lydney Park was bought in 1719 by Benjamin Bathurst, son of Benjamin Bathurst (c. 1639 – 1704), the Cofferer of the Household to Queen Anne, and has remained in the family since then. The elder Bathurst's fortune derived in large part from his involvement in the slave trade, through positions he held with both the East India and the Royal Africa Companies. The profits made funded the acquisition of a number of country estates in the West of England, including Lydney Park. The original house was close to the main road, with a large deer park behind it which was previously part of the estate of White Cross Manor.

In 1875, Rev. William Hiley Bathurst built a new house in the centre of the deer park, with views over the River Severn. The new house was built by C. H. Howell, with a formal garden and shrubberies. The old house was demolished, apart from the buildings now occupied by the Taurus Crafts centre. Rev. Bathurst's grandson Charles, later Viscount Bledisloe, made some further changes to the garden before the house became used in the Second World War, first to house the Dutch royal family and then a girls' school.

The current garden was developed after 1950 by the second Viscount Bledisloe and his family. Betty Fairfax Horsfall was also a involved in the re-design of many areas. There is a woodland garden running along a secluded valley, planted with magnolias, rhododendrons, azaleas and other flowering shrubs. There is a paved terrace above and formal gardens which are popular in the Spring, when the daffodils bloom.

The gardens are private land, and are open to the public on certain days depending on time of year. The house also has a museum containing findings from the Roman site and artefacts from New Zealand collected by the first Viscount Bledisloe.

== Archaeological remains ==
The area has an early British Iron Age promontory fort–type hill fort, known as Lydney Camp, covering 4.5 acres. The Romans dug there for iron ore, probably in the 3rd century AD, but apparently abandoned the workings as unproductive. Open-cast iron mines, or scowles, and tunnels still exist throughout the hill.

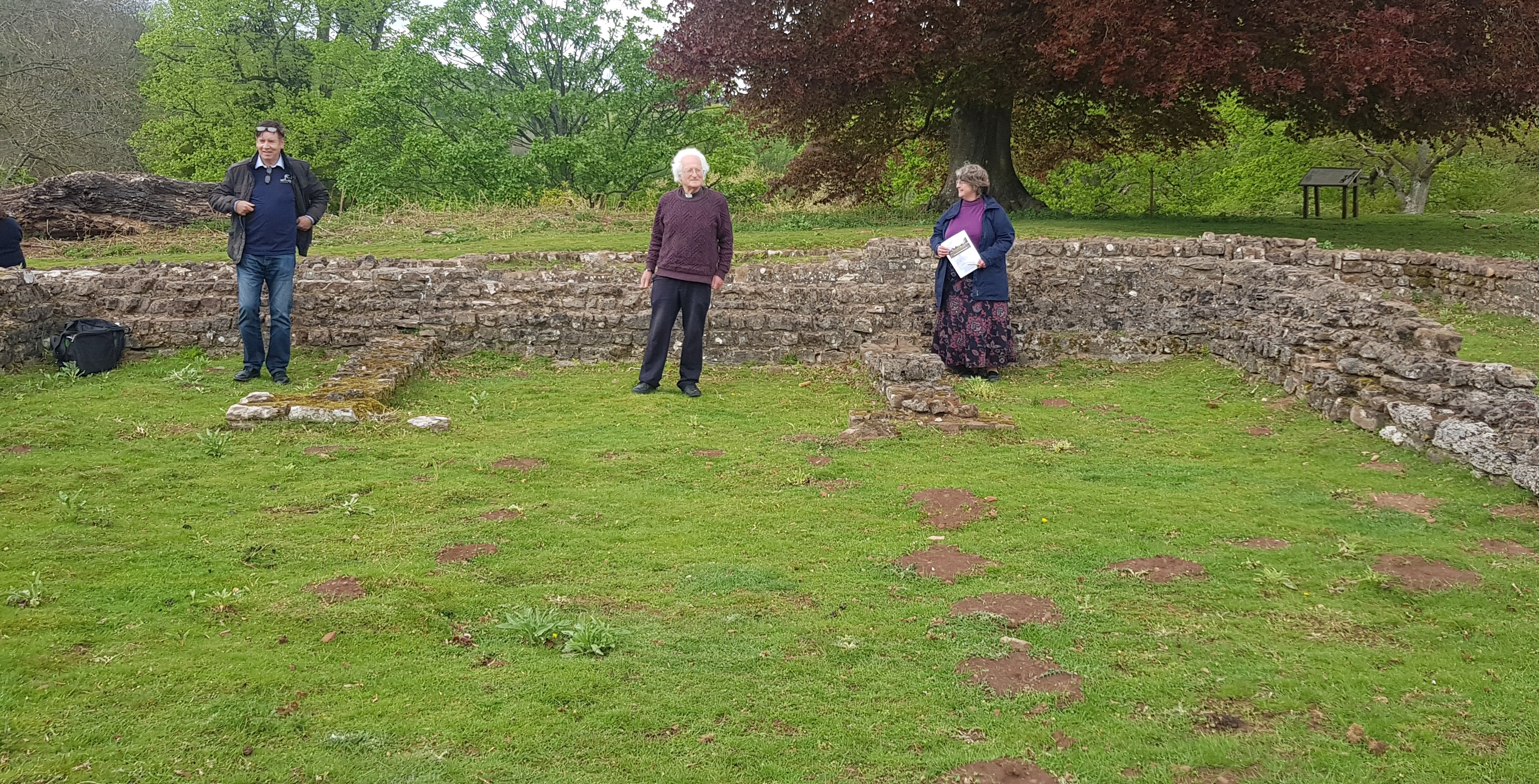
Lydney Roman temple to Nodens, the tripartite cella

In the late 4th century, the Romans built a Romano-Celtic temple to Nodens, a Celtic divinity who is reflected by the later figures of Nuada and Nudd/Lludd in Irish and Welsh mythology respectively. Lludd's name survives in the placename of Lydney. Several model dog images have been found there, indicating it was a healing shrine; dogs were associated with such shrines and may have been kept to lick wounds. The structure was a somewhat unusual design, rectangular rather than the usual square Romano-Celtic style temple. The end of the sanctuary or cella was not completely open, as usual; it had three rooms separated by stone walls. The walls of the cella were arched colonnades until a fault in the rock below caused the almost total collapse of the temple. It was rebuilt with solid walls. There was a fish-covered mosaic with an inscription that referred to 'Victorinus the Interpreter', probably an interpreter of dreams. The temple was accompanied by a large courtyard guest house, a long building used as dormitory accommodation and an elaborate bath suite or thermae.

Tessa Wheeler excavated the site between 1928–9 with her husband Mortimer Wheeler and more excavations took place in 1980–1981. The finds included a hoard of imitation Roman coins which were thought to date from the 5th century, but are now believed to be 4th century artefacts. The excavation report includes an appendix, "The Name 'Nodens'", written by Oxford philologist J. R. R. Tolkien.

== In popular culture ==
The estate features frequently in the 2025 film Hamnet. Other productions include Doctor Who, A Good Girl's Guide to Murder and Sex Education.
