= Blakeney, Gloucestershire =

Village in Gloucestershire, England

Coordinates: 51.76125°N 2.47636°W

Blakeney
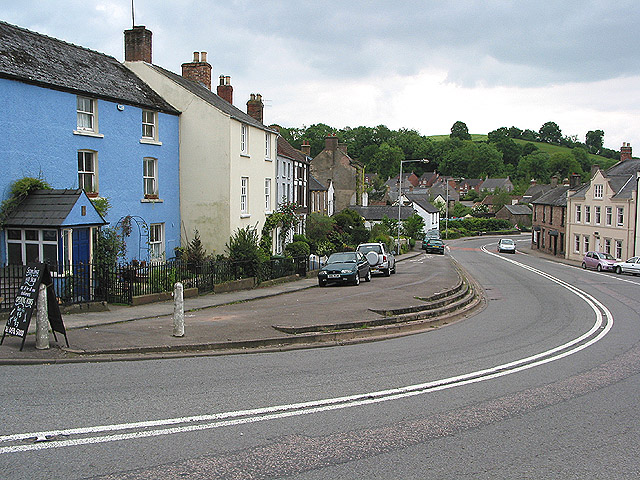

- Location within Gloucestershire
- OS grid reference: SO672070
- Civil parish: Awre
- District: Forest of Dean
- Shire county: Gloucestershire
- Region: South West
- Country: England
- Sovereign state: United Kingdom
- Post town: BLAKENEY
- Postcode district: GL15
- Police: Gloucestershire
- Fire: Gloucestershire
- Ambulance: South Western
- UK Parliament: Forest of Dean

Blakeney is a village in Gloucestershire, England. It in the parish of Awre and has views of the Forest of Dean.

It was the site of a Roman villa, dating to 75 AD, and home to Thomas Sternhold, a groom of King Henry VIII's Robes.

The local manor house is Hayes Manor, Viney Hill. Hawfield House on Newnham Road was built c. 1790.

== Governance ==
The parish lies in the Awre electoral ward, which includes the village of Awre and Blakeney. The population at the 2011 census was 1,714.
