= Lydney =

Town and civil parish in Gloucestershire, England

Coordinates: 51.7286°N 2.5285°W

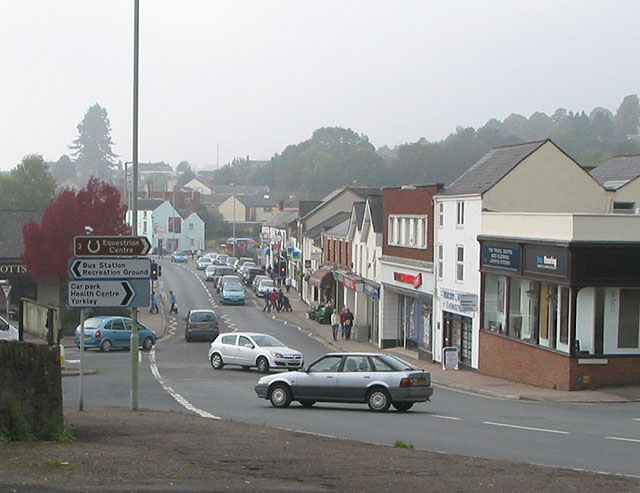
- Newerne Street, Lydney

- Location within Gloucestershire
- Population: 10,043 (2021 Census)
- OS grid reference: SO634032
- Civil parish: Lydney
- District: Forest of Dean
- Shire county: Gloucestershire
- Region: South West
- Country: England
- Sovereign state: United Kingdom
- Post town: LYDNEY
- Postcode district: GL15
- Dialling code: 01594
- Police: Gloucestershire
- Fire: Gloucestershire
- Ambulance: South Western
- UK Parliament: Forest of Dean

Lydney is a town and civil parish in Gloucestershire, England. It is on the west bank of the River Severn in the Forest of Dean District, and is 16 miles (25 km) southwest of Gloucester. The town has been bypassed by the A48 road since 1995. The population was 8,960 at the 2001 census, decreasing to 8,766 at the 2011 census, and increasing to 10,043 at the 2021 census.

Lydney has a harbour on the Severn, created when the Lydney Canal was built. Adjoining the town, Lydney Park gardens have a Roman temple dedicated to Nodens.

== Etymology ==
According to Cook (1906) the toponym "Lydney" derives from the Old English *Lydan-eġ, "Lludd's Island", which could connect it with the name Nudd/Nodens. However, more probable etymologies of Lydney are offered in other sources. A. D. Mills suggests "island or river-meadow of the sailor, or of a man named *Lida", citing the forms "Lideneg" from c. 853 and "Ledenei" from the 1086 Domesday Book. The English Place Name Society's Survey is in agreement with this.

== History ==
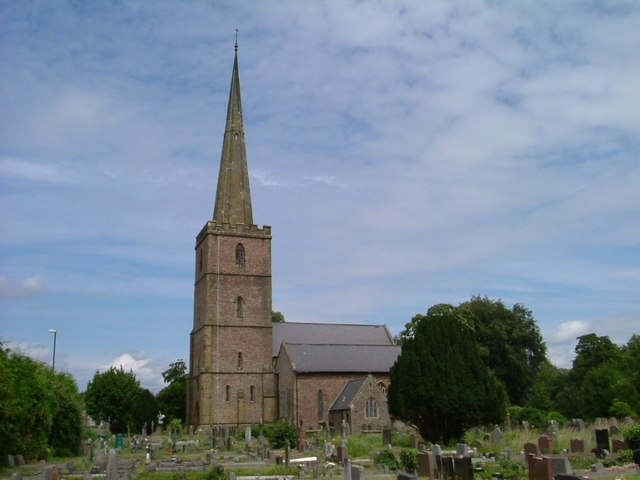
St Mary's Church, Lydney

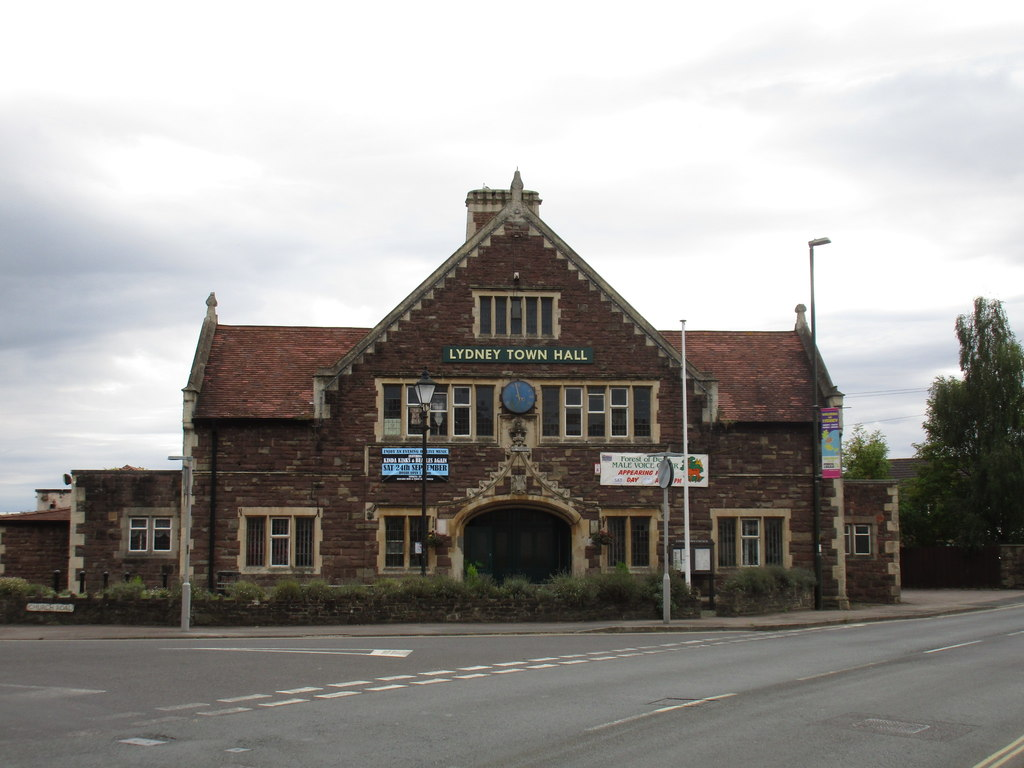
Lydney Town Hall

In the Iron Age a promontory fort was established at Lydney Park and later used for iron ore mining. In the late Roman period, a Roman temple to Nodens was built on the site of the fort.

In 1588 the Vice-Admiral of England Sir William Winter was granted the manor of Lydney in recognition of his services against the Spanish Armada. White Cross Manor, the house he built soon after he bought the manor, was burned down in 1645. In 1723 the Winter family sold their Lydney estate to the Bathurst family

In 1810, docks were constructed to capitalise on the town's location, close to the River Severn. The River Lyd flows through the town and into the Severn. In 1935, Charles Bathurst was created Viscount Bledisloe of Lydney upon his retirement as Governor-General of New Zealand. In 1940, the Pine End Works was built on Harbour Road, a Government run shadow factory producing plywood for the aircraft industry. On 31 August 1962, the Beatles played at Lydney Town Hall.

=== The Lydney Murder, 1964 ===
In 1964 the town was the site of the Lydney Murder, a significant case in the history of the use of entomology to assist criminal investigations. On 28 June 1964 a body was found in woods near Bracknell. By studying the maggots found on the body, forensic entomologist Professor Keith Simpson was able to establish a date of death of around 16 June 1964. Missing persons records for that date led the police to believe that the body was that of Peter Thomas, who had gone missing from his home in Lydney. Fingerprints confirmed the identification. William Brittle, a business partner of Thomas, was convicted of the murder. The Lydney Murder was the subject of an episode of the Discovery Channel documentary: "Crime Museum UK with Martin Kemp".

== Transport ==
The Severn Railway Bridge crossed just north of Lydney from Purton to Sharpness on the eastern bank. Built in the 1870s, it was damaged beyond repair by a pair of oil tanker barges in 1960. The barges hit Pier 17 bringing down two bowstring girders. There have been several plans to renew the link.

Lydney railway station, managed by Transport for Wales which serves the town, is located on the Gloucester to Newport Line, with connections from the town centre by the Dean Forest Railway. Lydney Canal was once an important harbour for shipping timber, coal and iron from the Forest of Dean. It is now a harbour for pleasure craft.

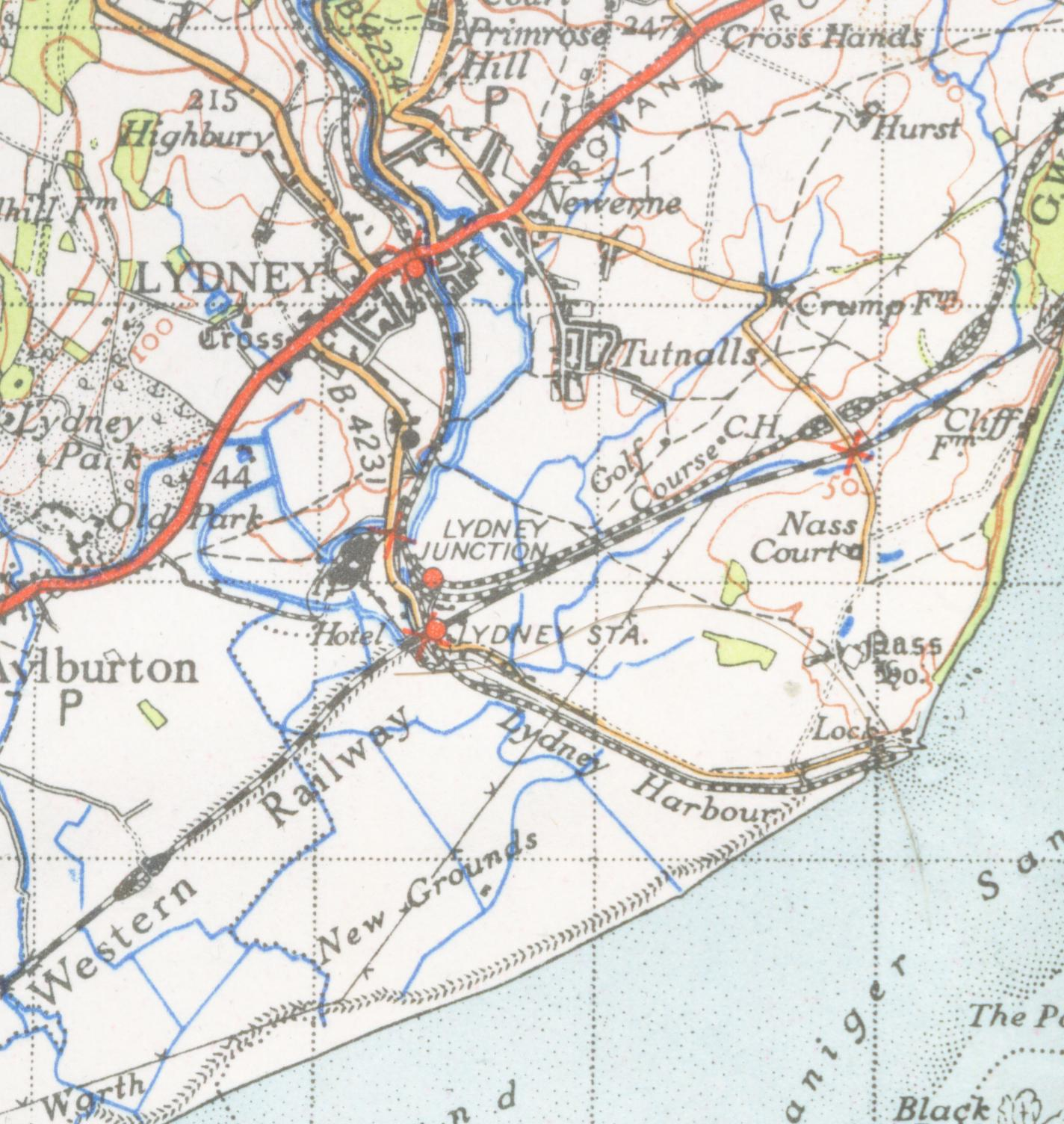
A map of Lydney from 1946

The original name of Mumford Body & Engineering Company Limited was changed to Lydney Coachworks Limited in 1947 to continue bus bodybuilding work. Orders came mainly from local companies such as Red & White, United Welsh and Newbury & District plus a surprise order from Leigh Corporation in Lancashire. After only a short time the coachworks closed down in March 1952, the uncompleted orders being transferred to Bristol TCC and Eastern Coach Works.

== Geography ==
The bedrock of Lydney and its environs is mostly sandstone of the St Maughans, Brownstones, Coleford and Cromhall formations, with Raglan formation mudstone in the east extending under the River Severn, different mudstone and limestone types to the west and Mercia mudstone to the south. The various types of bedrock date from the Silurian (from 423.6 million years ago (mya) for Raglan mudstone) through to the end of the Triassic and the beginning of the Jurassic periods (201.3 mya for Mercia mudstone). Lower-lying areas are overlain by Quaternary period deposits, sand and gravel (up to 2.588 mya, such as under Church Road and Bathurst Park) and the more recent estuarine alluvium of the Lydney Level, with some also from the Lyd, Plummer's Brook to the east and other brooks (up to 11.8 thousand years ago (the beginning of the Holocene epoch), such as under Swan Road, Regent Street, Lydney Recreation Ground and the east-west railway line. Elevations range from 7 metres at the ponds south of the A48 to over 150 metres around Brockhollands and north of Allaston.

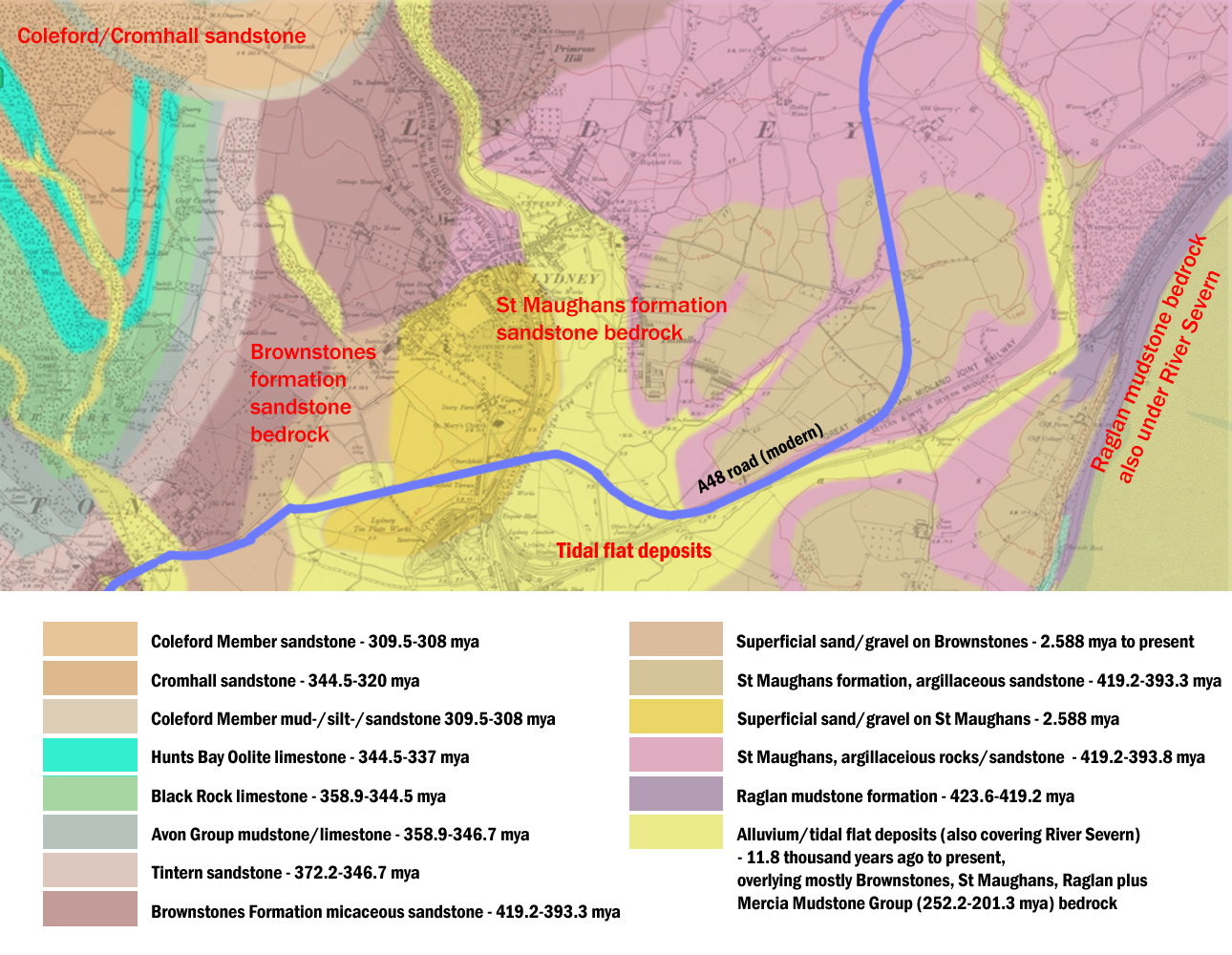
The bedrock around Lydney superimposed on the 1924 OS map along with the A48 road and a key to rock types.

Before the onset of the Holocene, parts of the coastline were at least as far north as Newerne Street, crossing north of the current A48 from the direction of Alvington in four places. There have been a number of changes in the coastline since Roman times. Early usage of alluvial resources was made from settlements based in the Forest of Dean. There were six or more land reclamation periods. An early seabank around reclaimed land from Stockwell Brook at Aylburton part of the way to Alvington has been attributed to first-millennium Roman construction. Iron was produced on an industrial scale and timber sourced from the Forest of Dean through the centuries as well as pottery being made. There was a large increase in the alluvium deposited between the years 500 and 1000. How exactly the land reclamation developed through mediaeval times is unknown. The flow of brooks into the Severn also changed - in places they were specifically channelled - and salt marsh growth below cliff areas was variously embanked, reclaimed, disputed and lost to the sea.

Coal, iron, timber and stone were distributed via boat moorings or jetties at Cone Pill, Alvington Pill, Wose Pill (Aylburton Pill), Lydney Pill and Purton Pill throughout the Middle Ages with evidence of sheep and cattle found at the sites. These products, and bark, still passed via Lydney Pill in the 17th and 18th centuries. Trade was with Bristol and beyond using sloops and trows, but access was affected by silting and suitable tides. The building of the South Wales Railway in 1851 and its embankment, which stopped marine flooding and therefore silting, was vital for later development. A horse-drawn tramway had been built prior to this - to serve the Forest iron and coal industry - and then Lydney Harbour in 1813; the tram system was upgraded in stages to become the standard gauge Severn & Wye Railway. Old wooden jetties were abandoned. Lydney grew with the ironworks - later a tin-plate factory - and also from railway building. Increasing industry led to rebuilding in Lydney and Newerne in the 19th century, the latter merging from a separate village into Lydney in the mid 19th century at what was to become Hill Street. Despite the growth, the Severn & Wye Railway was never financially secure and the Dean Forest Railway is the only working part that remains. The tinplate factory closed in 1957 but Lydney's suburban spread continued in the mid-20th century. The harbour was designated a scheduled monument in 1980.

== Government and politics ==
Lydney is covered by a three-tier system of local government. The upper authority is Gloucestershire County Council which is based in Shire Hall, Gloucester. The second tier being Forest of Dean District Council, based in Coleford which is a non-metropolitan district council.

The lowest tier of local government is Lydney Town Council which covers an area of approximately 8 square miles. The council was awarded "Quality Gold" standard in September 2015 in a national award scheme for local councils.

== Secondary education ==
The town is served by The Dean Academy, previously Whitecross School (1973-2012), and before that the Lydney Grammar School (1903–1973).

== Media ==
Local TV coverage is provided by BBC West and ITV West Country. Television signals are received from the Mendip TV transmitter. Local radio stations are BBC Radio Gloucestershire, Heart West, Greatest Hits Radio South West and Dean Radio, a community based radio station. The local newspaper is The Forester.

== Sport, recreation and arts ==
The town's rugby football club plays rugby union and is based at Regentsholme. The club had successful runs in the John Player Cup during the 1980s, including a match against Sale F.C. which was televised on the BBC's Rugby Special. There is also a leisure centre which contains an indoor swimming pool, a gym and more.

Lydney Cricket Club is an English amateur cricket club that was founded in 1862 and has been based on The Bob Park Cricket Ground on Swan Road since 1949. Lydney CC have three Saturday senior XI teams. The 1st and 2nd XI compete in the Gloucestershire County Cricket League, the 3rd XI are in the Cheltenham, Gloucester and Forest of Dean League. They also have a Midweek senior XI team in the Forest of Dean Midweek League, a Sunday XI team that play the occasional friendly matches in and around the local district, and an established junior training section that play competitive cricket in the Leadon Vale Youth Cricket League. Former Glamorgan captain and England opening batsman Steve James began his career at the club. Lydney was also the club of first English club of England wicket-keeper Geraint Jones.

Lydney Town F.C. is based at the town's recreation ground, they run a total of four sides playing Hellenic Football League, Gloucestershire Northern Senior League and two sides in the North Gloucestershire Football League. Bathurst Park in the centre of the town (not to be confused with Lydney Park on the town's outskirts) is home to several senior and junior football and cricket teams. There is a hockey club and a netball club which play their home games at Whitecross School. Lydney Golf Club was a nine-hole course located off Lakeside Avenue but has built a new course on a site located on the opposite side of the Lydney Bypass. There is an outdoor swimming pool, the Bathurst Swimming Pool built in the 1920s, open from May until early September. It is operated by volunteers (excluding the lifeguards).

Lydney Twonkers Scrabble Club play their home games at the town's library. The Twonkers were Western Area Scrabble League champions in 2001 and 2005 and were twice runners-up in the National Scrabble Club Knockout Tournament in 1999 and 2003. Lydney has a town brass band that was founded in 1892. The organisation operates three ensembles, the Town Band, the Training Band, and a Starter Group. The Town Band is a competitive band nationally graded in the Third Section, competing in various competitions throughout the year and regularly delivering concerts in the local community. In 2016 the Town Band qualified to represent the West of England at the National Brass Band Championship of Great Britain (Fourth Section) and in 2022 celebrated its 130th anniversary. The Training Band and Starter Group offer tuition for people at various stages of learning to play brass instruments, and regularly perform at events and concerts in the local community. Lydney parkrun started on 2 January 2016 - the free 5k timed weekly run, starts near to the garage block at Lydney Boating Lake and comprises three laps.

== Tourism ==
- Norchard is the home of the Dean Forest Railway.
- Lydney Park is the site of a Romano-British Roman Temple and was an Iron Age hillfort. It also has gardens which are open to the public for a limited period each spring.
- Taurus Crafts, which also occupies a section of the Lydney Park estate, is a Camphill community and popular visitor destination comprising a variety of craft shops and café.

== Twinned towns ==
- Bréhal, Manche, northwest France

== Organisations ==
- 614 (Lydney) Squadron Air Training Corps
- 586 (Lydney) Sea Cadet Corps
- Lydney and District Dramatic Society

== Notable people ==
See Category:People from Lydney

- Charles Bathurst, Lord Bledisloe (1867–1958), Governor-General of New Zealand from 1930 to 1935, who became Viscount Bledisloe of Lydney in 1935
- F. W. Harvey (1888–1957), a poet known particularly for his works during World War I, lived in Yorkley and practised as a solicitor in Lydney.
- Christopher Herbert (1944–), Bishop of St Albans from 1996 to 2009
- Herbert Howells (1892–1983), composer known for his Anglican church music, born in Lydney.
- Steve James (cricketer) (born 1967), former England / Glamorgan batsman and now Sports journalist for the Telegraph was born in Lydney and played both cricket and rugby for the town.
- Lisa Rogers, television presenter
- Sir William Winter (died 1589), Vice-Admiral of Queen Elizabeth I
- Sir John Winter (died 1676), grandson of William, and prominent royalist during the English Civil War

== See also ==
- Lydney power station
