= List of fellows of the British Academy elected in the 2000s =

The Fellowship of the British Academy consists of world-leading scholars and researchers in the humanities and social sciences. A number of fellows are elected each year in July at the Academy's annual general meeting.

== 2009 ==
The following fellows of the British Academy were elected at the annual general meeting in 2009:

- Professor Simon Baron-Cohen. Professor of Developmental Psychopathology; Director, Autism Research Centre, University of Cambridge
- Professor William Beinart. Rhodes Professor of Race Relations, University of Oxford; Professorial Fellow, St Antony's College
- Professor Martin Bell. Professor of Archaeology, University of Reading
- Robin Briggs. Senior Research Fellow, All Souls College, University of Oxford
- Professor Bruce Campbell. Professor of Medieval Economic History, Queen's University, Belfast
- Professor Christine Chinkin. Professor of International Law, London School of Economics
- Professor Paul Cloke. Professor of Human Geography, University of Exeter
- Dr Jean Dunbabin. Senior Research Fellow, St Anne's College, University of Oxford
- Professor John Duncan. Assistant Director, MRC Cognition and Brain Sciences Unit, Cambridge
- Professor Richard English. Professor of Politics, Queen's University, Belfast
- Professor Philip Ford. Professor of French and Neo-Latin Literature, University of Cambridge
- Professor Michael D. Freeman. Professor of English Law, University College London
- Professor Graham Furniss. Professor of African Language Literature, School of Oriental and African Studies, University of London
- Professor Malcolm Godden. Rawlinson and Bosworth Professor of Anglo-Saxon, University of Oxford
- Professor Rachel Griffith. Deputy Research Director, Institute for Fiscal Studies; professor of economics, University College London
- Professor Peter Hammond. Marie Curie Professor, Department of Economics, University of Warwick
- Professor Colin Haselgrove. Professor of Archaeology and Head of School of Archaeology and Ancient History, University of Leicester
- Professor Jonathan Haslam. Professor of the History of International Relations, University of Cambridge
- Professor Patsy Healey. Professor Emeritus, School of Architecture, Planning and Landscape, Newcastle University
- Dr Wilfrid Hodges. Formerly Professor of Mathematics, Queen Mary, University of London
- Professor Glyn Humphreys. Professor of Cognitive Psychology, University of Birmingham
- Professor Mary Jacobus. Professor of English and Director, Centre for Research in the Arts, Social Sciences, and Humanities, University of Cambridge
- Professor Ruth Lister. Professor of Social Policy, Loughborough University
- Professor John Mack. Professor of World Art Studies, University of East Anglia
- Dr John Marenbon. Senior Research Fellow, Trinity College, Cambridge
- Professor Roger Pearson. Professor of French, University of Oxford; Fellow and Praelector, The Queen's College
- Professor Christopher Pelling. Regius Professor of Greek, University of Oxford
- Professor Geoffrey Pullum. Professor of General Linguistics and Head of Linguistics and English Language, The University of Edinburgh
- Professor Susan Rankin. Professor of Medieval Music, University of Cambridge; Fellow, Emmanuel College
- Professor Michael Silk. Professor of Classical and Comparative Literature, King's College London
- Professor David M. Smith. Emeritus Professor of Geography, Queen Mary, University of London
- Professor Margaret J. Snowling. Professor of Psychology, University of York
- Professor Fiona Steele. Professor of Social Statistics, University of Bristol
- Professor Peter Taylor-Gooby. Professor of Social Policy, University of Kent; Honorary Co-Director, Risk Research Centre, Beijing Normal University
- Professor Alexandra Walsham. Professor of Reformation History, University of Exeter
- Professor Reg Ward. Formerly Professor of Modern History, University of Durham
- Professor David Womersley. Thomas Warton Professor of English Literature, University of Oxford
- Professor Sarah Worthington. Pro-Director and professor of law, London School of Economics

== 2008 ==
The following fellows of the British Academy were elected at the annual general meeting in 2008:

- Professor Sara Arber, professor of sociology, University of Surrey; Co-Director, Centre for Research on Ageing and Gender
- Professor Alan Baddeley, CBE, FRS, professor of psychology, University of York
- Professor Michael Bell, professor of English and Comparative Literary Studies, University of Warwick
- Professor John Blair, professor of Medieval History and Archaeology, University of Oxford; Fellow and Praelector, The Queen's College
- Professor Martin Browning, professor of economics, University of Oxford; Fellow, Nuffield College
- Professor Harald Clahsen, professor of linguistics, University of Essex
- Professor Trevor J. Dadson, professor of Hispanic studies and vice-principal (Humanities and Social Sciences), Queen Mary, University of London
- Professor Jon Driver, FMedSci, director, Institute of Cognitive Neuroscience, University College London
- Professor David Firth, professor of statistics, University of Warwick
- Professor Chris Frith, FRS, emeritus professor of Neuropsychology, Wellcome Trust Centre for Neuroimaging, University College London; Niels Bohr Visiting Professor, University of Aarhus
- Professor Roberta Gilchrist, professor of archaeology, University of Reading
- Professor Robert Hillenbrand, professor emeritus, History of Art, University of Edinburgh
- Professor Colin Jones, professor of history, Queen Mary, University of London
- Professor Oliver B. Linton, professor of Econometrics, London School of Economics
- Professor Julius Lipner, professor of Hinduism and the Comparative Study of Religion, University of Cambridge
- Professor Ruth Mace, professor of Evolutionary Anthropology, University College London
- Professor Christopher McCrudden, professor of Human Rights Law, University of Oxford; Fellow, Lincoln College
- Professor Linda McDowell, professor of Human Geography, University of Oxford; Fellow, St John's College
- Professor Iain McLean, professor of politics, University of Oxford; Official Fellow in Politics, Nuffield College
- Professor Hugh McLeod, professor of Church History, University of Birmingham
- Professor Daniel Miller, professor of Anthropology, University College London
- Professor Peter Neary, professor of economics, University of Oxford; Fellow, Merton College
- Professor Vivian Nutton, professor of the History of Medicine, University College London
- Professor Stephen Oakley, Kennedy Professor of Latin, University of Cambridge
- Professor Michael O'Brien, professor of American Intellectual History, University of Cambridge; Fellow, Jesus College
- Professor Ray Pahl, Visiting Research Professor, University of Essex; professor emeritus of Sociology, University of Kent
- Professor Roger Parker, Thurston Dart Professor of Music, King's College London
- Professor Kenneth Reid, CBE, FRSE, WS, professor of Property Law, University of Edinburgh
- Professor Martin J. S. Rudwick, Affiliated Research Scholar, History and Philosophy of Science, University of Cambridge; professor emeritus of History, University of California, San Diego
- Professor Roger Scruton, senior research fellow, Blackfriars Hall; Research Professor, Institute for the Psychological Sciences, Arlington, Virginia
- Professor Vivienne Shue, professor and Director, Contemporary China Studies, University of Oxford
- Professor Paul Julian Smith, professor of Spanish, University of Cambridge
- Professor Susan J. Smith, professor of Geography and Director of the Institute of Advanced Study, Durham University
- Professor Lisa Tickner, professor emerita of Art History, Middlesex University; visiting professor, Courtauld Institute of Art, University of London
- Professor John Tiley, professor of the Law of Taxation, University of Cambridge; Fellow, Queens’ College
- Professor Charles Townshend, professor of International History, Keele University
- Professor Tony Wilkinson, professor of archaeology, Durham University
- Professor Mark Williams, professor of Clinical Psychology and Wellcome Principal Research Fellow, University of Oxford

== 2007 ==
The following fellows of the British Academy were elected at the annual general meeting in 2007:

- Ash Amin, professor of Geography and executive director, Institute of Advanced Study, University of Durham
- Mark Armstrong, professor of economics, University College London
- Derek Attridge, professor of English, University of York
- Toby Barnard, lecturer in History, University of Oxford, Fellow of Hertford College
- John Barton, Oriel and Laing Professor of the Interpretation of Holy Scripture, University of Oxford
- Paul Binski, professor of the History of Medieval Art, University of Cambridge
- Rachel Bowlby, Northcliffe Professor of Modern English Literature, University College London
- Harvey Brown, professor of Philosophy of Physics, University of Oxford
- Andrew Burrows, Norton Rose Professor of Commercial Law, University of Oxford, Fellow of St Hugh's College
- Bryony Coles, professor of Prehistoric Archaeology, University of Exeter
- Ross Cranston, Centennial Professor of Law, London School of Economics and Political Science
- Robert Foley, Director of the Leverhulme Centre for Human Evolutionary Studies, University of Cambridge, Fellow of King's College
- Mary Fulbrook, professor of German History, University College London
- Christopher Fuller, professor of Anthropology, London School of Economics and Political Science
- John Gillingham, emeritus professor, London School of Economics and Political Science
- John Haffenden, Research Professor in English Literature, University of Sheffield
- Christopher Hill, Sir Patrick Sheehy Professor of International Relations, University of Cambridge
- Carole Hillenbrand, professor of Islamic History, University of Edinburgh
- Boyd Hilton, reader in Modern British History, University of Cambridge, Fellow of Trinity College
- Michael Hunter, professor of history, Birkbeck, University of London
- Catriona Kelly, professor of Russian and Co-Director, European Humanities Research Centre, University of Oxford
- Joni Lovenduski, Anniversary Professor of Politics, Birkbeck, University of London
- Richard McCabe, professor of English Language and Literature, University of Oxford, Fellow of Merton College
- David Martin, emeritus professor of sociology, London School of Economics and Political Science
- Henrietta Moore, professor of Social Anthropology, London School of Economics and Political Science
- Colin Morris, emeritus professor of Medieval History, University of Southampton
- Anthony Ogus, professor of law, University of Manchester
- Carole Pateman, Research Professor, European Studies, Cardiff University
- Nicholas Purcell, Fellow in Ancient History, St John's College, Oxford
- Genevra Richardson, professor of law, King's College London
- Ian Roberts, professor of linguistics, University of Cambridge
- Kevin Roberts, Sir John Hicks Professor of Economics, University of Oxford
- Mike Savage, professor of Sociology and Director of the ESRC Centre for Research in Socio-Cultural Change, University of Manchester
- John Scott, professor of sociology, University of Essex
- Richard Smith, professor of Econometric Theory and Economic Statistics, University of Cambridge
- Zara Steiner, emeritus fellow, New Hall, Cambridge
- Steven Tipper, professor of Cognitive Science, University of Wales, Bangor
- H. Peyton Young, Professorial Fellow, Nuffield College, Oxford; senior fellow, The Brookings Institution, Washington DC

== 2006 ==
The following fellows of the British Academy were elected at the annual general meeting in 2006:

- Professor Robert Adams (University of Oxford) Philosophy
- Professor Stephen Ball (The Institute of Education, University of London) Sociology of Education
- Professor Dorothy Bishop (University of Oxford) Developmental Neuropsychology
- Professor Ken Booth (University of Wales) International Relations
- Professor John Butt (University of Glasgow) History of Music
- Professor Richard Carwardine (University of Oxford) American History
- Professor Avshalom Caspi (King's College London, University of London) Social, Genetic and Developmental Psychiatry
- Professor John Child (University of Birmingham) Commerce
- Professor Hugh Collins (London School of Economics) Law
- Professor Helen Cooper (University of Cambridge) English Literature
- Professor James Dunn (University of Durham) Theology & Religion
- Professor David Feldman (University of Cambridge) Law
- Professor Andrew George (School of Oriental and African Studies) Assyriology
- Dr Sudhir Hazareesingh (University of Oxford) Politics
- Professor Ray Hudson (University of Durham) Geography
- Professor Michael Lipton (University of Sussex) Economics
- Professor Edna Longley (Queen's University Belfast) English Literature
- Professor Stephen Machin (University College London) Economics
- Professor Hector MacQueen (University of Edinburgh) Law
- Professor Martin Millett (University of Cambridge) Archaeology
- Professor Michael Moriarty (Queen Mary, University of London) French
- Professor Robin Osborne (University of Cambridge) Ancient History
- Professor Jacqueline Rose (Queen Mary, University of London) English Literature
- Professor Jill Rubery (University of Manchester) Economic Sociology
- Rosalind Savill (The Wallace Collection) History of Art
- Professor Hamish Scott (University of St Andrews) International History
- Professor Stephen Shennan (University College London) Archaeology
- Professor Neil Shephard (University of Oxford) Economics
- Professor Avi Shlaim (University of Oxford) International Relations
- Professor Paul Sillitoe (University of Durham) Anthropology
- Professor Patricia Thane (Institute of Historical Research, University of London) Contemporary British History
- Professor Edward Timms (University of Sussex) German Studies
- Professor Nigel Vincent (University of Manchester) Linguistics
- Professor Charles Withers (University of Edinburgh) Historical Geography

=== Senior fellows ===
- Professor Rosemary Cramp (University of Durham) Archaeology
- Professor Barbara Hardy (Birkbeck, University of London) English Literature
- Professor Rudolf Klein (University of Bath) Social Policy

== 2005 ==
The following fellows of the British Academy were elected at the annual general meeting in 2005:

- Professor Philip S. Alexander (University of Manchester), Theology
- Professor Andrew Barker (University of Birmingham), Classics
- Dr Bonnie Blackburn, Musicology (Independent scholar)
- Professor Richard Britnell (University of Durham), History
- Professor Bernard Capp (University of Warwick), History
- Professor Gordon Clark (University of Oxford), Geography
- Professor Roger Cotterrell (Queen Mary, University of London), Law
- Professor Cairns Craig (University of Edinburgh), English Literature
- Professor Colin Crouch (University of Warwick), Sociology
- Professor David d'Avray (University College London), History
- Professor Simon Deakin (University of Cambridge), Law
- Professor Ian Diamond (Economic and Social Research Council), Sociology
- Professor Dorothy Edgington (University of Oxford), Philosophy
- Professor Sandra Fredman (University of Oxford), Law
- Professor Miriam Glucksmann (University of Essex), Sociology
- Professor Christopher Gosden (University of Oxford), Archaeology
- Professor Sir Brian Harrison (University of Oxford), History
- Professor Jo Labanyi (University of Southampton), Spanish Literature
- Professor Andrew Linklater (University of Wales, Aberystwyth), Political Studies
- Professor David McCrone (University of Edinburgh), Sociology
- Professor April McMahon (University of Edinburgh), Linguistics
- Professor Ronald Martin (University of Cambridge), Geography
- Professor Costas Meghir (University College London), Economics
- Professor Dawn Oliver (University College London), Law
- Professor David Perrett (University of St Andrews), Psychology
- Professor Robert Plomin (Institute of Psychiatry, King's College London), Psychology
- Professor Graham Rees (Queen Mary, University of London), English Literature
- Professor David Reynolds (University of Cambridge), History
- Professor David Sanders (University of Essex), Political Studies
- Professor Geoffrey Searle (University of East Anglia), History
- Professor Hyun Song Shin (London School of Economics and Political Science), Economics
- Professor Nicholas Thomas (Goldsmiths College, University of London), Anthropology
- Professor Gerard van Gelder (University of Oxford), Oriental Studies
- Professor Anthony Venables (London School of Economics and Political Science), Economics
- Professor Marina Warner (University of Essex), English Literature

=== Senior fellows ===
- Professor Sydney Anglo (formerly University of Swansea), History
- Professor Stuart Hall (Open University), Cultural Studies
- Professor Michael Zander (London School of Economics and Political Science), Law

== 2004 ==
The following fellows of the British Academy were elected at the annual general meeting in 2004:

- Professor P. Allott (University of Cambridge), Law
- Professor D. J. Arnold (School of Oriental and African Studies, University of London), History
- Professor O. Attanasio (University College London), Economics
- Professor H. G. Beale (University of Warwick; Law Commission), Law
- Professor J. A. Beckford (University of Warwick), Sociology
- Professor M. Berg (University of Warwick), History
- Dr J. W. Binns (University of York), Literature
- Professor P. J. Bowler (Queen's University Belfast), History of Science
- Professor C. Clunas (School of Oriental and African Studies, University of London), History of Art
- Professor R. A. Duff (University of Stirling), Legal Philosophy
- Professor E. Duffy (University of Cambridge), History
- Professor R. O. Fardon (School of Oriental and African Studies, University of London), Anthropology
- Professor W. J. Hardcastle (Queen Margaret University College, Edinburgh), Linguistics
- Professor S. Hornblower (University College London), Classics
- Professor N. Jardine (University of Cambridge), History of Science
- Dr A. Jefferson (University of Oxford), French Literature
- Professor S. Kay (University of Cambridge), French Literature
- Professor A. Kuhn (Lancaster University), Film Studies
- Professor J. E. Lewis (University of Oxford), Sociology
- Professor D. A. MacKenzie (University of Edinburgh), Sociology
- Professor S. Mendus (University of York), Political Studies
- Professor R. Middleton (University of Newcastle upon Tyne), Musicology
- Professor S. J. Mithen (University of Reading), Archaeology
- Professor T. E. Moffitt (Institute of Psychiatry, King's College London), Psychology
- Professor M. Moran (University of Manchester), Political Studies
- Dr S. C. Ogilvie (University of Cambridge), Economic History
- Professor R. D. Portes (London Business School), Economics
- Mr J. D. Ray (University of Cambridge), Egyptology
- Professor R. Robertson (University of Oxford), German Literature
- Professor P. Simons (University of Leeds), Philosophy
- Professor C. Skinner (University of Southampton), Social Statistics
- Professor J. A. Sloboda (Keele University), Psychology
- Professor P. J. Taylor (Loughborough University), Geography
- Professor D. Trotter (University of Cambridge), English Literature
- Professor F. M. Young (University of Birmingham), Theology

=== Senior fellows ===
- Professor D. Harris (Institute of Archaeology, University College London), Geography
- Dr J. L. Oates (University of Cambridge), Archaeology
- Professor P. B. Townsend (University of Bristol), Sociology

== 2003 ==
The following fellows of the British Academy were elected at the annual general meeting in 2003:

- Professor R. C. Allen (University of Oxford), Economic History
- Professor I. Armstrong (Birkbeck, University of London), Literature
- Professor K. Barber (University of Birmingham), African Studies
- Professor E. Boa (University of Nottingham), German Literature
- Professor S. J. Broadie (University of St Andrews), Philosophy
- Professor S. Bruce (University of Aberdeen), Sociology
- Dr A. M. Burnett (The British Museum), Classics
- Professor D. M. Clark (Institute of Psychiatry, London), Psychology
- Professor J. Cleland (London School of Hygiene and Tropical Medicine), Demography
- Dr J. E. Curtis (The British Museum), Archaeology
- Professor G. I. Davies (University of Cambridge), Theology
- Professor I. J. Deary (University of Edinburgh), Psychology
- Professor T. F. Eagleton (University of Manchester), Literature
- Professor R. F. Ellen (University of Kent at Canterbury), Anthropology
- Professor D. J. Hand (Imperial College London), Social Statistics
- Professor P. J. Hennessy (Queen Mary, University of London), History
- Professor B. A. Hepple (University of Cambridge), Law
- Professor L. Hill (University of Warwick), Literature
- Professor D. J. Ibbetson (University of Cambridge), Law
- Professor J. T. Jackson (University of Wales at Swansea), History
- Professor D. King (University of Oxford), Political Studies
- Professor N. Kiyotaki (London School of Economics and Political Science), Economics
- Professor Lord Layard (London School of Economics and Political Science), Economics
- Professor J. D. McClean (University of Sheffield), Law
- Professor M. D. Maiden (University of Oxford), Linguistics
- Professor D. J. Mattingly (University of Leicester), Archaeology
- Professor Lord Parekh (London School of Economics and Political Science), Political Studies
- Professor A. M. Pettigrew (University of Warwick), Business Studies
- Professor A. Phillips (London School of Economics and Political Science), Political Studies
- Professor T. Puttfarken (University of Essex), Art History
- Professor B. Richardson (University of Leeds), Italian Literature
- Professor N. A. M. Rodger (University of Exeter), History
- Professor R. Sharpe (University of Oxford), History
- Professor N. J. Thrift (University of Bristol), Geography
- Professor B. W. Vickers, elected to Corresponding Fellowship in 1998, was transferred to Ordinary Fellowship on becoming ordinarily resident in the UK.
- Professor R. I. Woods (University of Liverpool), Demography

=== Senior fellows ===
- Professor G. Best, History
- Professor P. D. A. Harvey, History
- Professor E. Jones, Geography

== 2002 ==
The following fellows of the British Academy were elected at the annual general meeting in 2002:

- Professor S. W. Blackburn (University of Cambridge), Philosophy
- The Revd Canon Professor D. W. Brown (University of Durham), Theology
- Professor M. S. Butler (University of Oxford), English
- Professor B. Butterworth (University College London), Psychology
- Professor R. A. Dodgshon (University of Wales Aberystwyth), Geography
- Professor L. Dreyfus (King's College London), Musicology
- Professor M. Elliott (University of Liverpool), History
- Professor E. C. Fernie (Courtauld Institute of Art), History of Art
- Professor R. C. Floud (London Guildhall University), Economic History
- Professor M. R. Freedland (University of Oxford), Law
- Professor J. I. Gershuny (University of Essex), Sociology
- Professor H. Glennerster (London School of Economics and Political Science), Social Policy
- Professor F. Halliday (London School of Economics and Political Science), Political Science
- Professor P. F. Hammond (University of Leeds), English
- Dr M. R. C. Hewstone (University of Oxford), Psychology
- Professor J. R. Hills (London School of Economics and Political Science), Social Policy
- Professor C. D. Holes (University of Oxford), Arab studies
- Professor A. Hook (University of Glasgow), English
- Professor G. H. Jenkins (University of Wales Centre for Advanced Welsh and Celtic Studies), History
- Professor Sir Ian Kennedy (University College London), Law
- Dr P. A. Linehan (University of Cambridge), History
- Professor P. Magdalino (University of St Andrews), History
- Professor D. B. Massey (The Open University), Geography
- Dr D. Miller (University of Oxford), Political Science
- Professor Robin Milner-Gulland (University of Sussex), Russian Literature
- Professor S. Mitchell (University of Exeter), Classics
- Professor M. S. Morgan (London School of Economics and Political Science), Economic History
- Professor M. Murphy (London School of Economics and Political Science), Demography
- Professor D. W. Phillipson (University of Cambridge), Archaeology
- Professor C. A. Pissarides (London School of Economics and Political Science), Economics
- Dr O. Rackham (University of Cambridge), Ecological History
- Professor M. Steedman (University of Edinburgh), Linguistics
- Professor J. P. Thomas (University of St Andrews), Economics
- Professor M. Vaughan (University of Oxford), History of Africa
- Professor W. E. Yates (University of Exeter), Austrian literature

=== Senior fellows ===
- Professor M. D. I. Chisholm, Economic geography
- Miss B. E. de Cardi, Archaeology
- Professor A. H. Williams, Economics

== 2001 ==
The following fellows of the British Academy were elected at the annual general meeting in 2001:

- Professor M. R. Ayers (University of Oxford), Philosophy
- Professor J. Barrell (University of York), English
- Professor J. M. Batty (University College London), Spatial Analysis
- Professor J. Beatson (University of Cambridge), Law
- Professor T. J. Besley (London School of Economics and Political Science), Economics
- Professor N. Boyle (University of Cambridge), German Literature
- Professor T. M. O. Charles-Edwards (University of Oxford), Celtic Studies
- Professor A. Chesher (University College London), Economics
- Professor N. Cook (University of Southampton), Music
- Professor T. P. Dyson (London School of Economics and Political Science), Demography
- Mr J. M. Eekelaar (University of Oxford), Law
- Professor U. Frith (University College London), Psychology
- Professor J. A. Graham-Campbell (University College London), Archaeology
- Professor D. E. Greenway (University of London), History
- Professor A. F. Harding (University of Durham), Archaeology
- Professor James Harris (University of Oxford), Law
- Professor K. T. Hoppen (University of Hull), History
- Professor C. B. Howe (School of Oriental and African Studies, London), Economics
- Professor G. D. Josipovici (University of Sussex), English
- Professor A. T. L. Kuhrt (University College London), Ancient Near Eastern History
- Professor N. M. Lacey (London School of Economics and Political Science), Law
- Professor H. Lee (University of Oxford), English
- Professor D. Lieven (London School of Economics and Political Science), Russian History
- Professor D. N. J. MacCulloch (University of Oxford), History
- Dr I. J. McMullen (University of Oxford), Japanese
- Dr N. R. Malcolm, Early Modern History
- Professor J. Mayall (University of Cambridge), International Relations
- Professor E. C. Page (London School of Economics and Political Science), Public Policy
- Professor J. P. Parry (London School of Economics and Political Science), Anthropology
- Professor S. G. Pulman (University of Oxford), Linguistics
- Professor G. S. Smith (University of Oxford), Russian Literature
- The Revd Professor J. K. S. Ward (University of Oxford), Theology
- Professor A. W. Young (University of York), Psychology

=== Senior fellows ===
- Professor J. Durbin, Statistics
- Professor D. Lowenthal, Geography

== 2000 ==
The following fellows of the British Academy were elected at the annual general meeting in 2000:

- Professor R. D. Ashton (University College London), English
- Professor C. M. Britton (University of Aberdeen), French
- Professor J. Broome (University of St Andrews), Philosophy
- Professor D. S. T. Clark (University of Wales Swansea), History
- Dr S. A. Collini (University of Cambridge), Intellectual History and English Literature
- Professor J. R. Crawford (University of Cambridge), Law
- Professor D. Crystal (University of Wales Bangor), Linguistics
- Professor P. L. Davies (London School of Economics and Political Science), Law
- Dr D. Gambetta (University of Oxford), Sociology
- Professor A. M. Gamble (University of Sheffield), Politics
- Professor C. S. Gamble (University of Southampton), Archaeology
- Professor H. G. Genn (University College London), Law
- Professor J. Gray (University of Cambridge), Education
- Mr A. V. Griffiths (British Museum), Art History
- Dr P. R. Hardie (University of Cambridge), Classics
- Professor H. E. Joshi (Institute of Education, University of London), Demography
- Professor S. D. Keynes (University of Cambridge), History
- Dr P. F. Kornicki (University of Cambridge), Japanese Studies
- Professor A. J. Kuper (Brunel University), Anthropology
- Professor R. C. C. Law (University of Stirling), History
- Professor A. Leighton (University of Hull), English
- Professor J. M. Malcomson (University of Oxford), Economics
- Dr G. Marshall (Economic and Social Research Council), Sociology
- Professor L. Mulvey (Birkbeck College), Film Studies
- Professor L. A. Newson (King's College London), Geography
- The Revd Professor O. M. T. O'Donovan (University of Oxford), Theology
- Dr A. Offer (University of Oxford), Economic History
- Professor R. J. Overy (King's College London), History
- Professor P. M. Robinson (London School of Economics and Political Science), Economics
- Professor P. E. Rock (London School of Economics and Political Science), Sociology
- Dr W. F. Ryan (Warburg Institute, University of London), Slavonic Studies
- Professor T. J. Samson (University of Bristol), Musicology
- Dr J. D. Teasdale (MRC Cognition and Brain Sciences Unit), Psychology
- Professor H. S. Wallace (University of Sussex), Political Studies
- Professor A. Whiten (University of St Andrews), Psychology
