= Ogus =

Ogus is a surname. Notable people with the surname include:

- Anthony Ogus, English legal scholar
- Arthur Ogus, American mathematician
- Lionel Blair, born Henry Ogus (1928–2021), Canadian-born British comedian

== Other uses of word ==
- Olorun in Yorùbá mythology
