= Nautical Archaeology Society =

British nautical archaeology organisation

- Abbreviation: NAS
- Predecessor: Council for Nautical Archaeology (CNA)
- Formation: 1972
- Type: NGO
- Legal status: Company limited by guarantee
- Purpose: Nautical Archaeological research, publishing, education & training
- Headquarters: United Kingdom
- Location: Fort Cumberland, Fort Cumberland Road, Portsmouth PO4 9LD UK
- Region served: United Kingdom
- President: Lucy Blue
- Vice president: Chris Dobbs; Robert Yorke; Dr Stella Demesticha; Dr Paula Martin; Dr Toby Jones; Amer Khan
- Website: nauticalarchaeologysociety.org
- Formerly called: Nautical Archaeology Trust (NAT)

The Nautical Archaeology Society (NAS) is a charity registered in England and Wales and in Scotland and is a company limited by guarantee.

The charitable aims and object of the company are to further research in Nautical Archaeology and publish the results of such research and to advance education and training in the techniques pertaining to the study of Nautical Archaeology for the benefit of the public.

Nautical archaeology is an archaeological sub-discipline more generally known as maritime archaeology. It encompasses the archaeology of shipwrecks, underwater archaeology in seas and elsewhere and the archaeology of related features.

The society's logo is derived from the image of a merchant sailing ship on a Bichrome Ware Cypro-Archaic pottery jug 750-600BC, thought to be from the Karpas Peninsula in North Cyprus. The ancient vessel is part of the British Museum's collection (GR 1926.6-28.9). An analysis of how the iconography on this pot has been misinterpreted in recent history and how the image has been adapted for the society's logo, can be read in the editorial of the society's publication the International Journal of Nautical Archaeology (2000) 29.1: 1–2.

== History ==
=== Council for Nautical Archaeology ===
The predecessor of the Nautical Archaeology Society was the Council for Nautical Archaeology (CNA). This was formed in 1964 initially under the name the Committee for Nautical Archaeology:"so as to ensure that the many discoveries being made by divers should not go by default through lack of contact with the appropriate learned bodies and to act as a channel of communication with the many interests that were growing up in this new field of research and exploration."

The inaugural meeting of the CNA was held in Joan du Plat Taylor's office at the Institute of Nautical Archaeology, at the University of London. The Council includedindividuals from the Council for British Archaeology, the [Science Museum], the [Museum of London], the National Maritime Museum, [Bristol University], and the Institute of Archaeology at London University. The Society for Nautical Research, the Society for Post Medieval Archaeology. and the British Sub-Aqua Club were also represented on the council.

It was the CNA that was responsible for establishing the International Journal of Nautical Archaeology and the Nautical Archaeology Trust in 1972, but it was also concerned with the promotion of legislation for the protection of nautical archaeological sites playing a key part in what became the Protection of Wrecks Act 1973.

In 1984 the CNA was incorporated into the Council for British Archaeology as one of its research sub-committees

=== The Nautical Archaeology Trust ===
The predecessor of the Nautical Archaeology Society was a trust originally incorporated and registered as a charity under the name (The) Nautical Archaeological Trust Limited.

The Trust was established by the Council for Nautical Archaeology as its limited liability charitable arm. As a corporate body the Trust gained the legal ability to enter into contracts and to hold assets. The Trust's objects were

"the furtherance of research into nautical archaeology and the publication of the results of such research together with the advancement of training and education in the techniques pertaining to the study of nautical archaeology for the benefit of the public"

The Trust organised lectures, conferences and seminars, produced a newsletter and had a mechanism for associate membership for groups, associate individual members and subscribers. Associate membership provided a discounted purchase price for the International Journal of Nautical Archaeology.

In 1974, the then chairman of the CNA and of NAT, Professor W. F. Grimes, proposed that what was needed was a membership society but this took some years to establish. The CNA and the Trust eventually agreed the form of constitution of such a Society and the inaugural meeting took place in 1981. The intention of the Society was to act as a forum for the interchange of ideas and all of the associates and subscribers of the Trust were transferred to full membership the Society. The specific intention was to further cooperation between amateurs and professionals and its impact spread beyond the UK with a third of the new membership in its first year being from outside the UK. Joan du Plat Taylor was the first president.

For a few years from 1981, the activities of the charity (the Trust) were separated from the interchange between the members (the Society) although both had identical aims, but the situation was resolved by a special meeting of the Trust held on 3 July 1986 at the Science Museum. At this meeting, the members of the Trust voted to change the name of the Trust to the Nautical Archaeology Society and to change the constitution (the articles of association) to reflect the change to a membership organisation. The reconstituted organisation continued to have responsibility for producing the IJNA and a clause safeguarding the academic standards of the journal was added to the articles. The renamed Trust thus subsumed the role of providing a forum for the interchange of ideas and the memberships of those who had participated in the Society (many of whom were in any case the original associates and subscribers of the Trust) transferred to membership of the incorporated body.

=== The beginning of NAS training ===
With the dual advantages of a participatory membership and its status as a registered charity, in 1986 the newly reconstituted Nautical Archaeology Society ran the first events in what later became its four-part internationally accredited training syllabus.

== NAS training and education ==
=== NAS training in the UK ===
The society educates and trains professional and avocational archaeologists and commercial and recreational divers. The aim of the NAS training syllabus is to develop awareness, respect for and understanding of the maritime cultural heritage and to develop capability in the maritime archaeological sector by training in relevant archaeological and underwater skills as well as to develop knowledge and understanding of the technology of the past.

In the past, NAS Training has been supported by Cadw and Historic Scotland to provide training opportunities in Wales and Scotland respectively. The development of the NAS training curriculum was supported by English Heritage and its predecessors from 1991 to 2004.

In 2015, the NAS Education Programme underwent a major revision to adapt to the increasing use of online learning and to make the qualification system more flexible. As of 2017, the NAS qualification system in the UK consists of the following:

NAS Foundation in Maritime Archaeology

10 or 15 credits

This qualification is achieved by completing:

- Two Elearning courses: Intro to Maritime Archaeology and Underwater Archaeology or Intertidal Archaeology
- Underwater Recorder and Surveyor Skills Days or Foreshore Recorder and Surveyor Skills Days

NAS Certificate in Maritime Archaeology

100 credits in total

This qualification is achieved by completing:

- NAS Foundation, and
- 85 or 90 credits from Maritime Archaeology Courses, Events or Fieldwork

NAS Award in Maritime Archaeology

300 credits in total

This qualification is achieved by completing:

- NAS Certificate (worth 100 credits), and an additional
- 200 credits from Maritime Archaeology Courses, Events or Fieldwork, and
- A 2,000-word archaeological report

NAS members progress through these qualifications by earning credits which are accrued by participating in courses, events and fieldwork. Attending NAS-run activities accrues 5 credits per day while attending non-NAS or self-directed activities earns 2.5 credits per day.

=== NAS Training International ===
The NAS four-part qualification system is still used by the numerous International Training Partners that use a locally adapted version of the NAS syllabus to share knowledge and practical skills to local divers and non-divers. The list and contact details of current International Training Partners can be found here.

=== NAS Conference ===
The annual two-day NAS conference provides a forum for a wide range of presentations on nautical archaeology. At the event the annual Adopt-a-Wreck award is presented. Administration of the Muckelroy award was transferred to the NAS in 2009 and is presented every two years to the best publication.

== Publications ==
=== International Journal of Nautical Archaeology ===
The International Journal of Nautical Archaeology (IJNA) is published bi-annually (Print ISSN 1057-2414, online ISSN 1095-9270) for NAS by Wiley Publishing Ltd. It is a peer-reviewed academic journal but articles by amateur researchers that meet the journal's standards have been published.

IJNA aims to cover all aspects of nautical archaeological research including the seas, ships, cargos, harbours and sailors of the past.

IJNA was first published in 1972 under the founding editor Joan du Plat Taylor. Since 1980, IJNA has been edited by Ian Morrison, James Kirkman, Valerie Fenwick and Paula Martin. The current editor, Miranda Richardson, took over in 2012. Angela Croome held the position of reviews editor from the journal's foundation until 2016 when Paula Martin took over.

=== NAS Monograph Series ===
The first in the NAS monograph series is the report of the Sound of Mull Archaeological Project (SOMAP), which ran from 1994 to 2005.

The NAS monograph series was edited by Gerald Grainge until 2016, who was replaced by Julian Whitewright.

=== NAS Handbook ===
The NAS Handbook provides an introduction to underwater archaeology. The material in the handbook is consistent with the teaching of the NAS Training programme.

== Awards ==
=== Joan du Plat Taylor Award ===
The Joan du Plat Taylor Award is a grant awarded annually by the Nautical Archaeology Society to support publication of nautical archaeological research. The grant was originally funded personally by Joan du Plat Taylor, the founder editor of IJNA and the first president of the Nautical Archaeology Society.

=== Adopt-a-Wreck ===
The Adopt-a-wreck scheme, run by the Nautical Archaeology Society was set up as a joint initiative with the Maritime and Coastguard Agency to encourage groups and individuals to take a close interest in a maritime site, and adopt a minimum level of stewardship, monitoring how the site changes over time. As well as shipwrecks, adopted sites can include harbour works and buildings with nautical connections, coastal habitations, hulks and other sea wrack of archaeological interest. The society maintains a register of all such adopted sites and since 2003 has provided an annual award to the person or group that has made the most significant contribution to maritime archaeology and research through the adoption process. A pilot for the Adopt-a-Wreck scheme was run on the East Indiaman Halsewell

Past winners of the Adopt-a-Wreck award have included:

- 2003. The Joint Services Dive Club and the Gibraltar Museum's Underwater Research Unit for their work on the "Inner and Outer" wreck sites at Gibraltar Harbour.
- 2004. The Queen's University Belfast Sub-Aqua Club (QUBSAC) for their investigation of the Alastor, a steel-hulled luxury motor yacht that sank in 1948
- 2005. The Weymouth LUNAR Society for their work on the Earl of Abergavenny shipwreck
- 2007. Paul Barnett for work on the hulks at Purton on the River Severn
- 2008. Ed Cumming and Todd Stevens for the project on the Nancy packet, the Rosevear Ledge wrecksite, published as a book.
- 2009. Alison Mayor and the Southsea Sub Aqua Club for Tanks & Bulldozers "Sleeping Centaurs" site off the south coast of England
- 2010. Southsea Sub Aqua Club for the Landing Craft LTC (A) 2428.
- 2011. Weymouth Lunar Society for the "Lost torpedoes of Weymouth and Portland".

=== Keith Muckelroy Award ===
This award is made in memory of Keith Muckelroy and until 2008 was awarded as part of the British Archaeological Awards. In 2008 the administration of the award was transferred to the Nautical Archaeological Society, and the award has been presented bi-annually at the NAS conference since 2009. It is awarded for the best published work covering maritime, nautical or underwater archaeology which best reflects the pioneering ideas and scholarly standards of Keith Muckelroy.

== Projects ==
=== The Gresham Ship ===
In 2004 the Nautical Archaeological Society took custody of the remains of an Elizabethan wreck discovered in the Princes Channel of the Thames Estuary during dredging operations by the Port of London Authority. The remains represented a navigation hazard, and as they had been disturbed and damaged by the dredging operations, preservation in situ was not an option. The remains were investigated by Wessex Archaeology and dendrochronology by Nigel Nayling of the University of Wales gave a construction date of soon after 1754, probably in East Anglia. The remains were transferred to Horsea Island, an estuarine lake near Portsmouth, where the brackish water should enable the timbers to stabilise while they are accessible to students for study and training purposes. The remains of the ship are being studied as part of a five-year project also involving the Port of London Authority, the Museum at Docklands, the Institute of Archaeology at University College London, Gresham College and the University of Southern Denmark. The ship has been termed the "Gresham Ship" because one of the guns recovered had the initials and emblem of Sir Thomas Gresham.

=== Wreckmap Projects ===
The Nautical Archaeology Society manages or participates in research projects with the aims of firstly furthering research and secondly enabling novice professionals and avocational archaeologists to have opportunities to get involved in archaeological research and hence develop individual experience and promote best practice in investigative techniques. Wreckmap projects focus on surveying and recording sites in a specific area. Projects have included the 'Sound of Mull Archaeological Project' (SOMAP), which ran from 1994 to 2005 and the "SubMAP" project, which investigated the wreck of Resurgam. Wreckmap projects have also been conducted in Portland, Dorset and Teesbay (near Hartlepool).

Wreckmap Britain 2005 encouraged recreational divers to submit a recording form for a favourite dive anywhere in Britain. Wreckmap Britain 2006 was launched at the London International Dive Show (LIDS) on 1 April 2006 and has distributed 100,000 recording forms to recreational divers. The results will be added to the Shipwreck Index. WreckMap Britain is conducted in partnership with the Marine Conservation Society (SeaSearch) and sponsored by Crown Estate, the BSAC Jubilee Trust and PADI through the Project AWARE Foundation.

=== Forton Lake ===
Forton Lake is a community based project to record the hulks of vessels abandoned at Forton Lake, Gosport. The field work and community training for the project was supported by the Heritage Lottery Fund from 2006 to 2007 and the final year of fieldwork in 2008 and publication is being supported by Crown Estate. The project is carried out jointly with the Hampshire and Wight Trust for Maritime Archaeology.

=== Diving into history ===
The Diving into History Project, supported by the Heritage Lottery Fund, ran from 2006 to 2008 and included outreach activities to the public and support for Adopt-a-Wreck groups. In addition community based projects were carried out, including an industrial and oral history project involving underwater survey of Stoney Cove and archive and oral history research.

=== Dig, Dive and Discover ===
In 2006 a group of sea cadets were given the opportunity to become maritime archaeologists, learning to scuba dive, to research archives and to design web sites. The project was supported by the Heritage Lottery Fund 'Young roots' programme and was carried out in conjunction with Hartlepool library and Hartlepool Diving Club. An excavation of a wreck was carried out at Middleton Sands on Teesbay and the cadets built their own website documenting their experiences.

== Archives ==
=== North East England Maritime Archaeology Research Archive ===
The North East England Maritime Archaeology Research Archive (NEEMARA) was established in 2006 thanks to grant funding from English Heritage and from local councils. The archive contains reference material on ships, shipbuilding and archaeological reports and is housed at the offices of Hartlepool Borough Council.

=== NAS Project and NAS Part Two Reports ===
Projects directly run by NAS (including Wreckmap projects) have project reports that are submitted to the appropriate Heritage Environment Record(HER). As part of NAS training, students submit a project report for part two of the NAS Certificate in Underwater and Foreshore Archaeology. Where appropriate reports are submitted to the appropriate local HER. NAS project reports and NAS Part two reports are also available to view at NAS offices in Portsmouth.

=== The Big Anchor Project ===
The Big Anchor Project is an international project which is attempting to collect data on anchors to provide a research resource for the identification of anchors. Following a pilot exercise by the South West Maritime History Society and Dorset County Council, a web site enables anyone to upload pghotographs and information about anchors.

=== Hartlepool Built ===
The Hartlepool Built project is a project to gather data on ships built in Hartlepool and on the people who sailed them. Designed as a web-based oral history type project, the project captures, and publishes on the web information on ships built in Hartlepool over the last 170 years, with photographs and other information from relatives of those whose lives were affected.
