= Glucksmann =

Glucksmann is a surname. Notable people include:

- André Glucksmann (1937–2015), French philosopher, activist and writer
- Christine Buci-Glucksmann, French philosopher
- Heinrich Glücksmann (1864–1947), Moravian-born Austrian author
- Max Glücksmann (1875–1946), Argentine Jewish pioneer of the music and film industries
- Miriam Glucksmann, British sociologist
- Raphaël Glucksmann, (born 1979), French politician, Member of European Parliament
