= Public Archaeology (journal) =

Journal

- Discipline: Archaeology, Cultural heritage management
- Language: English
- Edited by: Tim Schadla-Hall

Publication details
- History: 2000-present
- Publisher: Maney Publishing (United Kingdom)
- Frequency: Quarterly

Standard abbreviations
- ISO 4: Public Archaeol.

Indexing
- ISSN: 1465-5187 (print); 1753-5530 (web)
- LCCN: 00227110
- OCLC no.: 45034765

Links
- Journal homepage; Online access

Public Archaeology is a quarterly peer-reviewed academic journal established in 2000, edited by Gabe Moshenska and previously edited by Tim Schadla-Hall. It is published by Maney Publishing. It covers the relationships between practical archaeology, archaeological theory and cultural heritage management models, and the involvement of wider civic, governmental, and community concerns.

The journal's creation had been initiated and overseen by Peter Ucko after he took over as director of the UCL Institute of Archaeology.
