= Tim Dyson =

British demographer

Tim Dyson (born 1949) is a British demographer with a focus on India's population. He is currently professor emeritus of Population Studies at the London School of Economics. He was elected as a Fellow of the British Academy in 2001.

== Bibliography ==
- A Population History of India: From the First Modern People to the Present Day. Oxford University Press, 2018.
- Population and Development: The Demographic Transition. Zed Books, 2010.
- Twenty-first Century India: Population, Economy, Human Development, and the Environment, eds. Tim Dyson, Robert Cassen, Leela Visaria.
- Famine Demography: Perspectives from the Past and Present. Oxford University Press, 2002.
- Population and Food: Global Trends and Future Prospects. Psychology Press, 1996.
- India's demography: essays on the contemporary population. 1982.

== See also ==
- List of fellows of the British Academy elected in the 2000s
