= Vera Conlon =

British archaeological photographer (1906–1994)

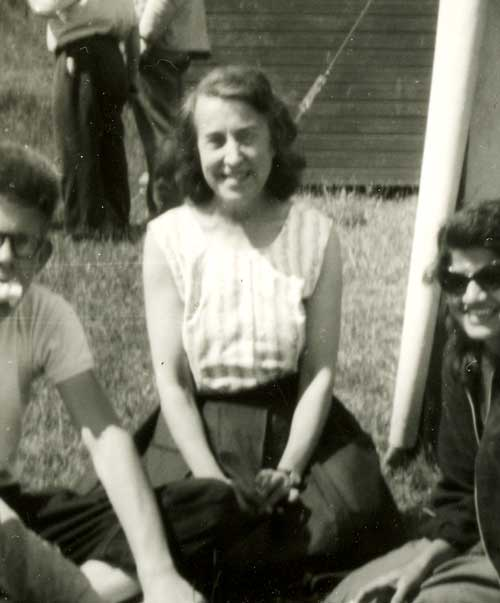
- Born: Vera Marjorie Drake; 12 August 1906; Streatham, Surrey, England
- Died: 23 January 1994 (aged 87); Swanage, Dorset, England

Academic work
- Institutions: Head of the Photography Department, UCL Institute of Archaeology
- Notable works: Camera Techniques in Archaeology (1973)

Vera Marjorie Conlon (née Drake, 12 August 1906 – 23 January 1994) was a British archaeological excavation photographer who is noted for her work at the UCL Institute of Archaeology and for publishing a textbook about photographic techniques for archaeologists.

== Life ==
Conlon was born in 1906 in Streatham, Surrey, as Vera Marjorie Drake, and was later described as having a "strong cockney accent." She was known by the nickname "Connie."

Conlon worked as an excavation photographer and as an assistant to Mortimer Wheeler. She became one of the early women employees at the UCL Institute of Archaeology in London. She worked as the head of the Photography Department. She retired in 1971.

After retiring, she published Camera Techniques in Archaeology, a textbook for archaeologists, in 1973. The book adapted advice to the newest camera and darkroom equipment available to photographers. It became a notable work about the specific photographic techniques required for field archaeology and "showed a keen awareness of photography's own lineage in archaeology."

Conlon died in 1994 in Swanage, Dorset.
