= David R. Harris (geographer) =

David Russell Harris, FSA, FBA (14 December 1930 – 25 December 2013) was a British geographer, anthropologist, archaeologist and academic, well known for his detailed work on the origins of agriculture and the domestication of plants and animals. He was a director of the Institute of Archaeology at University College London, and retained a position as Professor Emeritus of the Human Environment at the Institute.

== Early life and education ==
Harris was born on 14 December 1930 in London, England. As an undergraduate Harris attended University College, Oxford, first obtaining a BA in Geography. Continuing with postgraduate studies at Oxford, in 1955 Harris was awarded an M.Litt. in Geography with a thesis entitled "Water resources and land use in Tunisia". In 1963, he was awarded a PhD from the Geography Department at University of California, Berkeley, upon defending his dissertation entitled "Plants, animals, and man in the Outer Leeward Islands, West Indies. An ecological study of Antigua, Barbuda, and Anguilla".

== Career ==
=== Military service ===
Harris served in the Royal Air Force from 1949 to 1950 as part of National Service.

=== Academic career ===
Between 1958 and 1964, Harris lectured in geography at Queen Mary College, University of London. During the 1962–63 academic year he was a visiting lecturer at the University of New Mexico in Albuquerque, in addition to pursuing a doctorate at the University of California, Berkeley.

In 1964 Harris took up a position as Reader in Geography at University College London (UCL). In 1980 he moved as professor to the Institute of Archaeology, becoming Head of Department of Human Environment and later Director of the Institute, taking over from John Davies Evans who retired in 1989. The postgraduate academic research journal Papers from the Institute of Archaeology, published by the Institute, was launched in Harris' first year as director.

Harris continued as Director until his own retirement from the position in 1996, and was succeeded by Peter Ucko. In 2000 he was named an Honorary Fellow of UCL in recognition of his service to the institution.

During the course of his academic career Harris has also held various visiting fellowships, including at the University of Toronto in 1970, the Australian National University's Research School of Pacific and Asian Studies (RSPAS) in 1974, and at the Anthropology department at University of California, Berkeley in 1982.

== Research ==
Harris has conducted research investigations in many parts of the world, including New Guinea, the Torres Strait, Africa, Central America and Eurasia. His research has generally been concerned with the ecology and development of agriculture and other modes of subsistence among human cultures.

In 1989 Harris and a colleague were invited to lead the archaeological investigations of the environment at the central Asian Early Neolithic site of Jeitun, located in what is now Turkmenistan. Continuing investigations during the 1990s by Harris and the international project team at Jeitun and surrounds obtained conclusive evidence of agricultural-pastoral settlement by at least 6000 BCE, the earliest indications of agricultural practices in Central Asia known at that point.

== Honours ==
In 1972 he was presented with the Back Award by the Royal Geographical Society, for "Contributions to Biogeography, especially of Middle America". He was elected Fellow of the Society of Antiquaries of London (FSA) in 1982 and Fellow of the British Academy (FBA) in 2004.
