= Post Office Rifles =

British Army unit (1868–1935)

49th Middlesex Rifle Volunteers Corps (Post Office Rifles) 24th Middlesex Rifle Volunteers (Post Office Rifles) 8th (City of London) Battalion, London Regiment (Post Office Rifles)
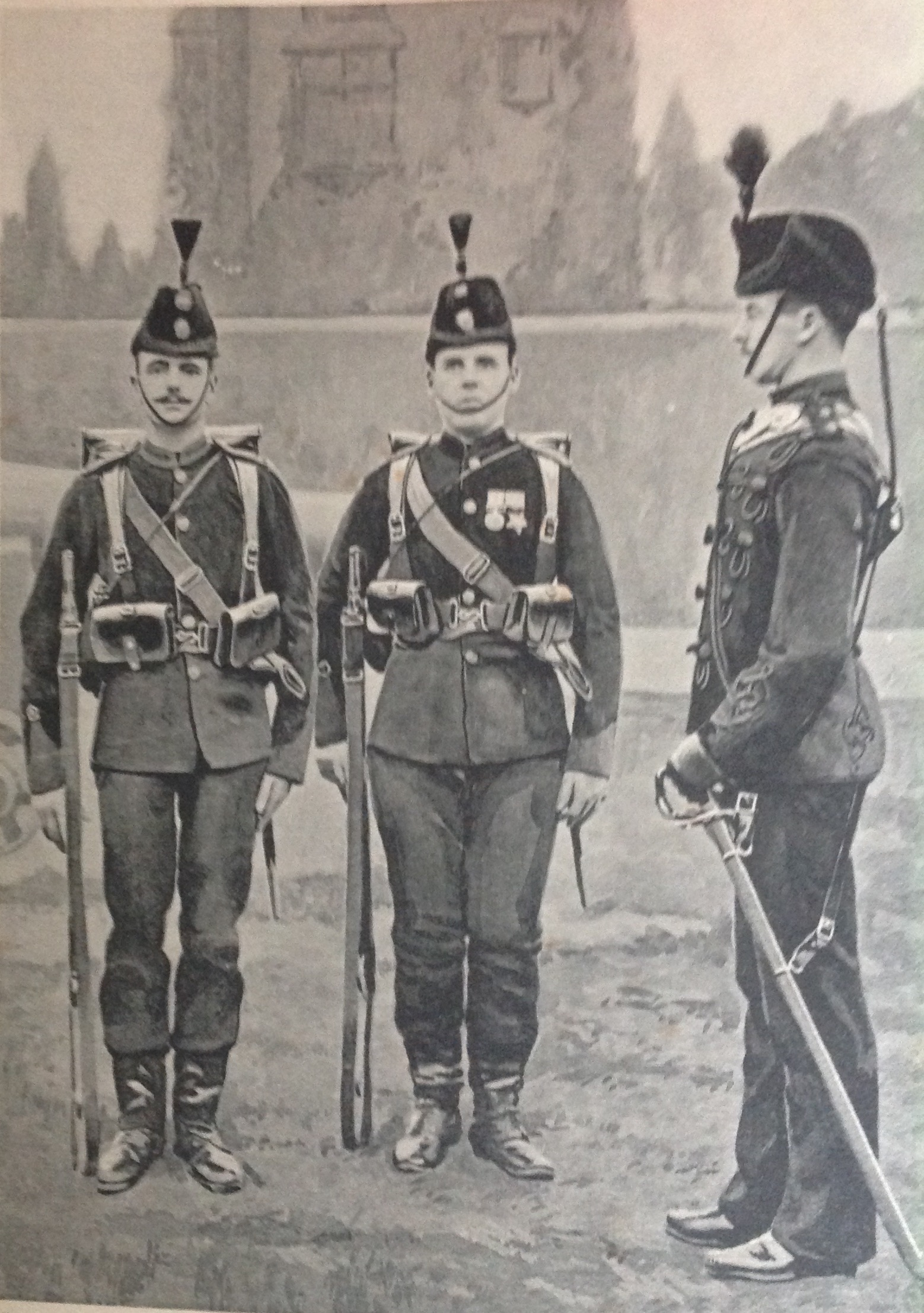
- 24th Middlesex Rifle Volunteers (Post Office Rifles) in 1895
- Active: 1868–1921
- Country: United Kingdom
- Branch: Territorial Army
- Type: Infantry
- Size: Battalion
- Part of: London Regiment
- Garrison/HQ: Bunhill Row drill hall

The Post Office Rifles was a unit of the British Army formed in 1868 from volunteers as part of the Volunteer Force, which later became the Territorial Force (and later the Territorial Army). The unit evolved several times until 1935, after which the name was lost during one of many reorganisations.

== History ==
=== Beginnings – 49th Middlesex Rifle Volunteers Corps (Post Office Rifles) ===
When the Volunteer Force was formed in 1859/60 Viscount Bury raised the 21st Middlesex Rifles Volunteer Corps (Civil Service Rifles) drawing its recruits from civil servants based in London. There were sufficient recruits from the GPO staff to form a Post Office company, which was placed under Captain John Lowther du Plat Taylor's command.

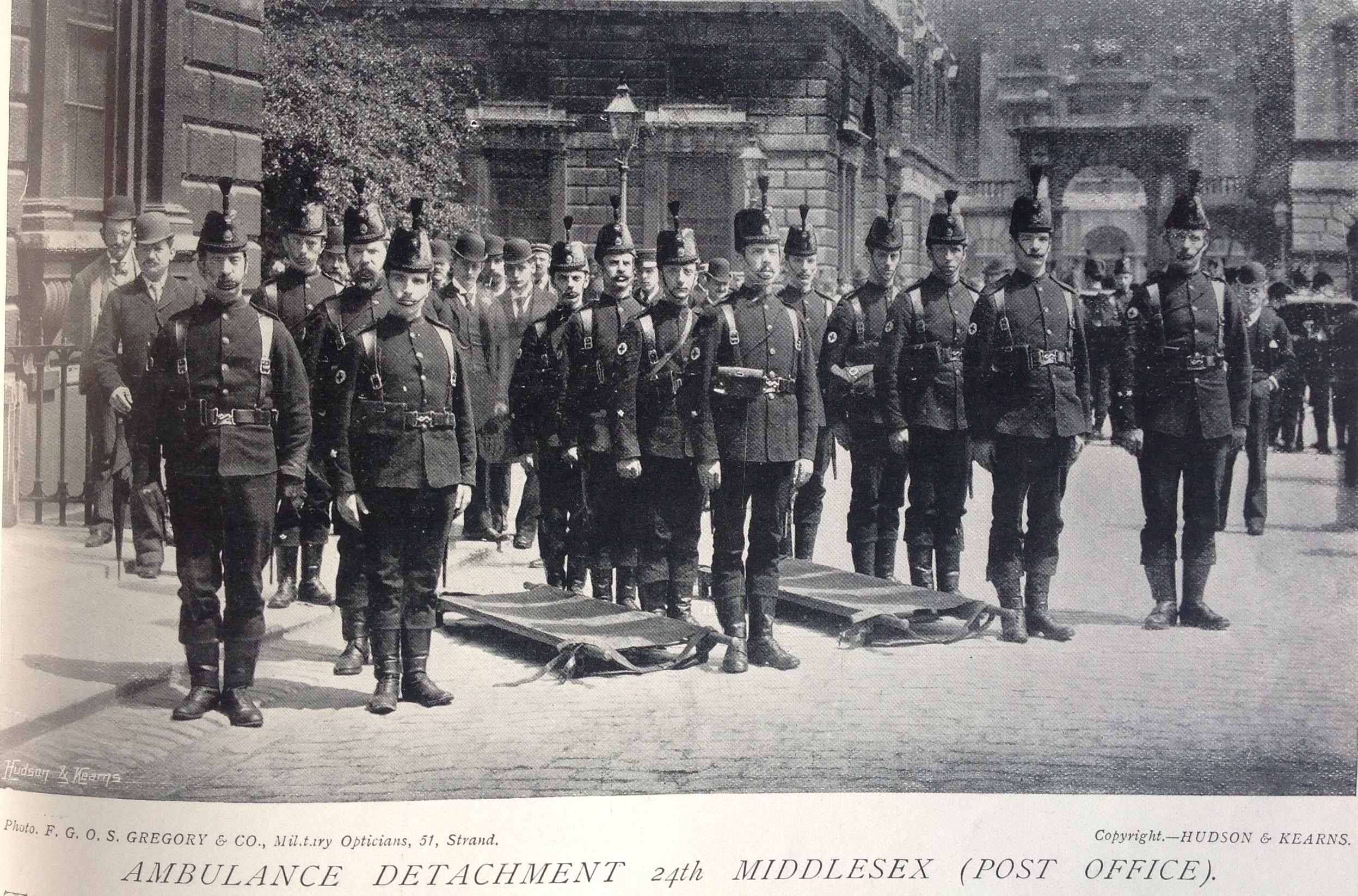
Ambulance detachment, 24th Middlesex Rifle Volunteers (Post Office), 1897

On 13 December 1867 a bomb exploded outside Middlesex House of Detention, Clerkenwell. It was an attempt to rescue two members of Irish Republican Brotherhood (IRB) detained there awaiting trial. The Government's response was to raise special constables to protect London buildings against future "Fenian outrages".

The GPO special constables had been supervised and trained by Major JL du Plat Taylor (and Civil Service Rifles' NCOs). After the crisis was over the GPO special constables approached du Plat Taylor to request that they be formed into a Rifle Volunteer unit. Du Plat Taylor, who was the Private Secretary to the Postmaster General, sought permission from the Postmaster General and the War Office to form such a unit. Permission was granted and on 2 March 1868 the 49th Middlesex Rifle Volunteers Corps (Post Office Rifles) was duly raised from the Post Office Companies (Civil Service Rifles) and the special constables all of whom were GPO servants. Du Plat Taylor become its first commanding officer.

In 1880 a reorganisation of the volunteer corps saw the unit renumbered as the 24th Middlesex Rifle Volunteers (Post Office Rifles).

=== Service in Egypt ===
In 1882 a detachment of two officers and 102 men volunteered for service in Egypt, where they performed postal and telegraph duties under the command of General Garnet Wolseley. As the Army Post Office Corps (APOC) they came under enemy fire at Kassassin in so doing became the first 'volunteers' to see enemy action. The 24th Battalion was awarded their first battle honour "Egypt 1882".

=== South Africa ===
During the Second Boer War the 24th Middlesex contributed a large number of volunteers comprising 16 officers and more than 1,000 other ranks. In 1907 they were awarded the battle honour "South Africa 1899–1902".

In 1902 the 24th Middlesex (Post office) was one of six rifle corps to form the 4th or City of London Brigade, a volunteer infantry brigade.

=== Territorial Force ===
More changes were introduced upon the creation of the Territorial and Reserve Forces Act 1907. This Act brought the part-time Volunteer Force infantry artillery and engineer units and Yeomanry (mounted) regiments from across the country together into a single Territorial Force in 1908. As a result of this, the 24th Middlesex became the 8th (City of London) Battalion, London Regiment (Post Office Rifles).

=== World War I ===
The Post Office Rifles served with distinction in the Great War. They arrived in France on 18 March 1915. By the end of the war, 1,800 men from the Post Office Rifles would be dead and 4,500 more would be wounded.

After the outbreak of the war, the existing units of the Territorial Force each formed duplicate (or "second line") units. The existing Post Office Rifles was redesignated as the 1/8th Battalion, London Regiment when a second Post Office Rifles battalion, the 2/8th Londons, was formed in September 1914. In 1915 a third line battalion, the 3/8th was formed.

Between them, the three battalions earned 19 battle honours.

At the Capture of Wurst Farm, in September 1917, the 2/8th lost over half its fighting strength, dead or wounded, but its men were awarded a total of 40 gallantry medals. These included a Victoria Cross won by Sergeant A. J. Knight, making him the only Post Office Rifleman to win this honour.

==== Battle honours ====
The battle honours awarded to the 8th (City of London) Battalion, The London Regiment (Post Office Rifles) for the "Great War" were announced in March 1924. Ten honours (shown in bold type) were selected by the regiment to be displayed on the King's Colours:

- **Festubert, 1915**
- **Loos**
- **Somme 1916, '18**
- Flers-Courcelette
- Le Transloy
- **Bullecourt**
- **Messines, 1917**
- **Ypres, 1917**
- Menin Road
- Passchendaele
- **Cambrai, 1917**
- **St. Quentin**
- Bapaume, 1918
- **Amiens**
- Albert, 1918
- Hindenburg Line
- Épehy
- **Pursuit to Mons**
- France and Flanders 1915–'18

=== After the Great War ===
Further reorganisations took place after World War I. Many saw these changes as a dilution of the battalion's Post Office identity. Included in these reorganisations was the amalgamation of the 8th Battalion with the non-Post Office 7th (City of London) Battalion, London Regiment in 1921, forming the 7th London Regiment (Post Office Rifles). In 1935, it was converted from infantry to the searchlight role as the 32nd (7th City of London) Anti-aircraft Battalion, Royal Engineers, and the 'Post Office Rifles' name was finally dropped. In 1939 they expanded from Finsbury Square into newly built drill-halls at Grove Park and Bexleyheath. Shortly afterward the unit was split, forming a duplicate battalion at Bexleyheath called 73rd (Kent Fortress) S/Light Battalion, Royal Engineers, with outstations at Greenhithe and Sidcup. In 1940 both units re-badged as Royal Artillery.

Successor units still occupy Grove Park and Bexleyheath drill-halls, as 265 (Home Counties) Battery, 106th (Yeomanry) Regiment, Royal Artillery and 265 (Kent and County of London Yeomanry) Support Squadron, Royal Corps of Signals. Both units strive to continue and maintain the traditions and history of their predecessor regiments.

== Memorials to the Post Office Rifles ==
Memorials to the Post Office Rifles can be found at Paignton War Memorial, at St. Lawrence Parish Church, Abbots Langley, and on a plaque outside the Uckfield village church. A First World War Book of Remembrance is sited in St Botolph Aldersgate EC1, the church traditionally associated with the unit, whilst a Second World War regimental memorial plaque is displayed within the Army Reserve Centre in Grove Park, London.

There is no formal memorial to the Rifles in France, but many of the fallen from the Great War have their names recorded on memorials such as the Menin Gate at Ypres and Sir Edwin Lutyens's memorial to the missing at Thiepval. Also on the Pozieres Memorial to the missing of 1918 and notably the Arras memorial. Men of the Rifles are buried in Bedford House Cemetery outside Ypres (Ieper) in Belgium.

== See also ==
- Volunteer Force (Great Britain)
- Territorial Army (United Kingdom)
- British Army
- Militia (United Kingdom)
- Honourable Artillery Company
- The Royal Hong Kong Regiment (The Volunteers)
- Yeomanry
- 1st Nottinghamshire (Robin Hood) Volunteer Rifle Corps (VRC)
- Artists' Rifles
- The Liverpool Scottish
- Home Service Force

== References and sources ==
Notes

Sources

- The British Postal Museum & Archive
