= John Lowther du Plat Taylor =

British army officer

Colonel John Lowther du Plat Taylor CB VD (1829 – 5 March 1904) was the founder of the Army Post Office Corps and the Post Office Rifles.

Du Plat Taylor trained at the Royal Military College, Sandhurst, but left in 1844 before he was commissioned. He then joined the Consular Service and was posted to China but was invalided back home after just two years. He joined the General Post Office in 1852 and worked as a Private Secretary to the Secretary of the Post Office, Sir Rowland Hill and then to Postmaster General.

== Volunteer Movement and Formation of the Post Office Rifles and Army Post Office Corps ==
His lifelong association with the Volunteer Movement began in 1860 when he joined the Civil Service Rifle Volunteers as an ensign. He was promoted to captain and by 1865 he held the rank of major.

He formed the 49th Middlesex Rifle Volunteers in 1868 and was its commanding officer until 1896. In 1880 the regiment was renumbered 24th Middlesex Rifle Volunteers and he was appointed its honorary Colonel on 27 February 1901.

He proposed at his regiment's 1872 annual prize giving the formation of a reservist Telegraph and Postal Corps and in 1877 the War Office established a committee "to consider the formation of a Corps for the performance of Postal Duties in the Field". The War Office rejected the committee's recommendation that such an organisation should be formed, reasoning that it would be too expensive. However, in mid July 1882 du Plat Taylor was authorised by the Postmaster General, Henry Fawcett and the Secretary of State for War, Hugh Childers to organise an Army Post Office Corps (APOC), and on Saturday 22 July 1882 Queen Victoria issued a Royal Warrant to that effect.

The Army Post Office Corps was formed from 'M' Company 24th Middlesex Rifles Volunteers and deployed on active service during the 1882 Anglo-Egyptian War. Their service resulted in them becoming the first Volunteer unit to earn a Battle Honour (Egypt 1882). The APOC also saw active service during the Suakin Expedition (1884–85) and the Second Boer War (1899–1902).

In 1913 the APOC was reformed as the Royal Engineers (Postal Section) Special Reserve.

== Career after 1870 ==
He resigned his position with the General Post Office in 1870 to take up a new appointment as the Secretary and General Manager of the East and West India Dock Company (E&WIDC), at the time the largest docking operation in the world. Between 1882 and 1886, under his stewardship, the company purchased the marsh land upon which was built Tilbury Docks. The Tilbury Docks were officially opened on 17 April 1886. He was at the helm of the company when the London Dock Strike (1889) began at the West India Docks.

He was awarded a CB in June 1887 for services to the Volunteer Movement.

Du Plat Taylor died on 5 March 1904 and was buried with full military honours at Brookwood Cemetery near Woking, Surrey.

== Family ==
He was born in 1829, the son of Captain John Taylor, Paymaster of Pensioners of the King's German Legion.

He married Emily Emma Charlotte (b. 1841), the only daughter of the late William Corbet, High Sheriff of Leicestershire and the Honourable Mrs Emily Arabella Jane St. John Smith daughter of Henry St John, 4th Viscount Bolingbroke, 5th Viscount St John, of Bitteswell Hall, near Lutterworth, Leicestershire at the parish church of St Leonard's-on-Sea, East Sussex on 2 February 1863.

They had four sons: John Corbert Guthrie (b 22 Nov 1863), St.John Louis Hyde (b. 22 Jan 1865), George Philip (b. 22 Nov 1867) and Francis Maurice Gustavus (1878–1954),

The maritime archaeologist, Joan du Plat Taylor (1906–1983), is his granddaughter although he died two years before she was born.

=== Sons ===
Lieutenant Colonel St. John Louis Hyde du Plat Taylor, DSO, Royal Artillery - Born on 22 January 1865 educated at Haileybury School (1878–1883) and the Royal Military Academy. Woolwich He was commissioned in the Royal Artillery 9 December 1884; was promoted Captain 22 March 1894, and Major 18 April 1900. Major du Plat-Taylor served in the South African War, 1899–1900, taking part in operations in the Orange Free State in April 1900. He was present at the Relief of Mafeking. Operations in the Transvaal in May and June 1900; operations in the Transvaal, east of Pretoria, in July 1900; operations in the Transvaal, west of Pretoria, including action at Zilikat's Nek. He was mentioned in Despatches [London Gazette, 16 April. 1901]; received the Queen's Medal with three clasps, and was created a Companion of the Distinguished Service Order [London Gazette, 27 September 1901]: "St John Louis Hyde du Plat-Taylor, Major, Royal Artillery. In recognition of services during the operations in South Africa" which was presented to him by the King 28 October 1901. Major Taylor retired 16 May 1906. He served in the European War, 1914–18, and was mentioned in Despatches. He married Alice, sister of Sir John Purves-Hume Campbell, 8th Baronet, in 1904. They had one daughter, Joan du Plat Taylor (1906–1983). He died in Purves Greenlaw Berwickshire, United Kingdom on 2 March 1936.

Major George Philip Du Plat Taylor, OBE, Grenadier Guards, - Died 16 July 1926 married Miss Sydney Hilda Hutton Croft (c. 1872–1930) on 23 January 1896.
