= Joan du Plat Taylor =

British archaeologist

Joan Mabel Frederica Du Plat Taylor
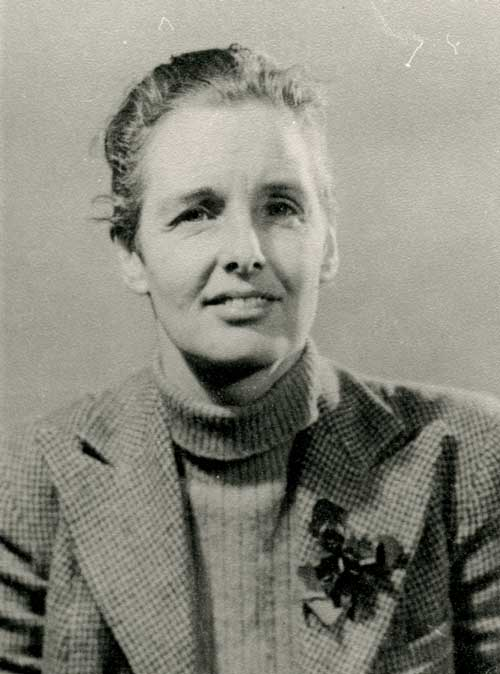
- Born: 26 June 1906; Glasgow, Scotland
- Died: 21 May 1983 (aged 76)
- Occupation: Archaeologist
- Known for: Maritime Archaeology and establishing the Council for Nautical Archaeology

Joan Mabel Frederica du Plat Taylor FSA (Glasgow, 26 June 1906 – Cambridge, 21 May 1983) was a British archaeologist and pioneer of underwater nautical archaeology.

== Early life and education ==
Joan Mabel Frederica Du Plat Taylor was born in Glasgow, Scotland on 26 June 1906. Her parents were Colonel St. John Louis Hyde du Plat Taylor and Alice Home-Purves and her grandfather was Colonel John Lowther du Plat Taylor CB VD (1829 – 5 March 1904). She had no formal training, but became one of the first maritime archaeologists. From 1931 until 1939 she was Assistant Curator at the Cyprus Museum. In Cyprus she excavated a Late Bronze Age mining site at Apliki and a temple of the same period in Myrtou-Pigades. Then from 1940 to 1962 she was a librarian at the Institute of Archaeology, working with Geraldine Talbot as assistant librarian.

== Nautical archaeology ==
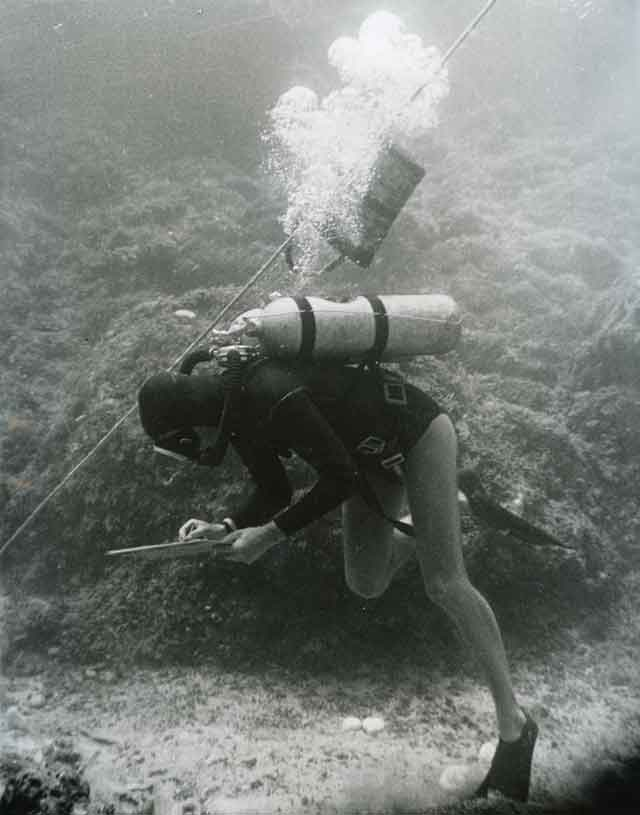
du Plat Taylor excavating a shipwreck at Cape Gelidonya in 1959.

She campaigned to bring nautical archaeology into the academic fold. She co-directed an excavation of an ancient shipwreck at Cape Gelidonya in 1960 alongside George Bass, was instrumental in establishing the Council for Nautical Archaeology in 1964 and was founder editor of the International Journal of Nautical Archaeology (IJNA) from 1972 to 1980. She also recognised that amateurs could play an important role in archaeology and established systems to educate and encourage them. She was the first president of the Nautical Archaeology Society.

She personally funded a grant to support publication of nautical archaeological research. Since her death, the award has continued to be given by the Nautical Archaeology Society as the Joan du Plat Taylor Award.

== Selected publications ==
- Taylor, Joan du Plat; Tufnell, Olga (1930). "A pottery industry in Cyprus". Ancient Egypt. 4: 119–122.
- Taylor, Joan Du Plat (1932). "A Thirteenth Century Church in Nicosia, Cyprus". Antiquity. 6 (24): 469–471. doi:10.1017/S0003598X00102741. S2CID 163852204.
- Taylor, Joan du Plat (1933). "A Water Cistern with Byzantine Paintings, Salamis, Cyprus". The Antiquaries Journal. 13 (2): 97–108. doi:10.1017/S0003581500039408. S2CID 162530580.
  - Taylor, Joan du Plat; (1935). "Hoard of Medieval Coins from Tripoli Bastion", Report of the Department of Antiquities, Cyprus, 22–24.
- Taylor, Joan Du Plat (1938). "Medieval Graves in Cyprus". Ars Islamica. 5 (1): 55–87. JSTOR 4520917.
- Taylor, Joan du Plat (1952). "A Late Bronze Age settlement at Apliki, Cyprus". The Antiquaries Journal. 32 (3–4): 133–167. doi:10.1017/S0003581500076800. S2CID 163360734.
- Taylor, Joan Du Plat (1959). "The Cypriot and Syrian Pottery from Al Mina, Syria". Iraq. 21 (1): 62–92. doi:10.2307/4199649. JSTOR 4199649. S2CID 192926016.
- Taylor, Joan du Plat (1964). "Motya: A Phoenician Trading Settlement in Sicily". Archaeology. 17 (2): 91–100.
- World Underwater Federation (1965). du Plat Taylor, Joan (ed.). Marine Archaeology: developments during sixty years in the Mediterranean. Crowell.
