= Tim Schadla-Hall =

British archaeologist (1947–2023)

Tim Schadla-Hall FSA
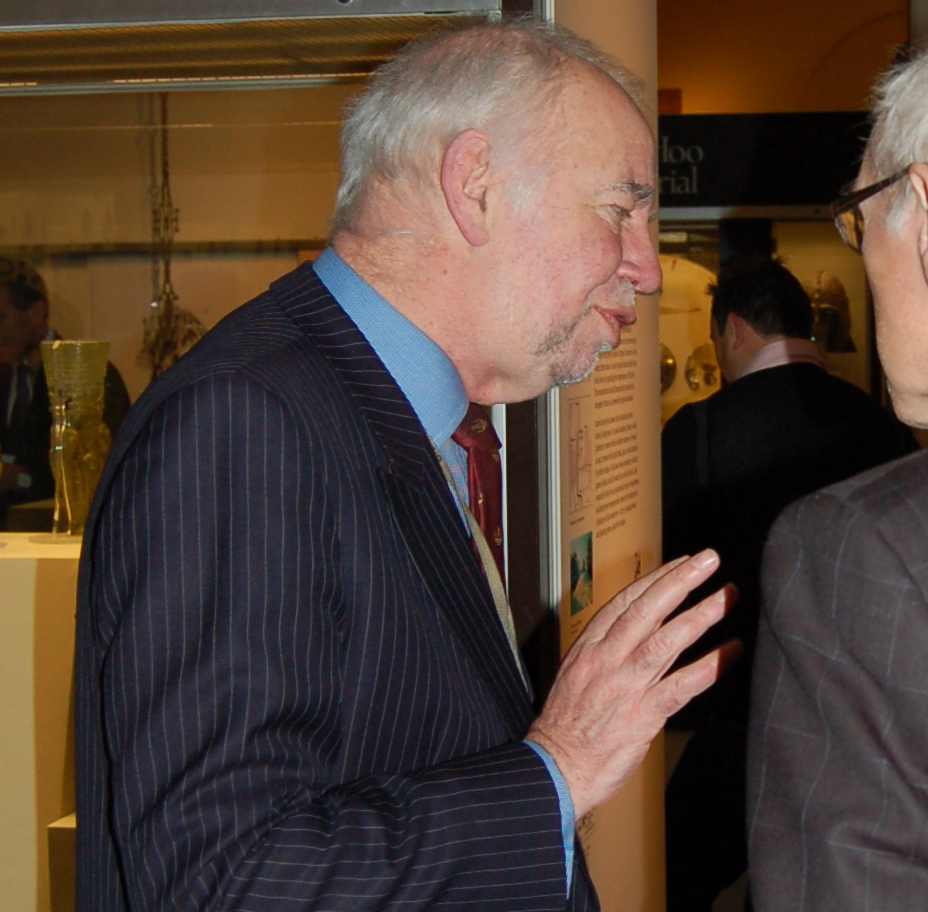
- Schadla-Hall in 2010
- Born: Richard Timothy Schadla-Hall; 24 September 1947
- Died: 9 January 2023 (aged 75)

Academic work
- Discipline: Archaeologist
- Sub-discipline: Public archaeology; archaeology of Britain; museology
- Institutions: Institute of Archaeology, University College London

Richard Timothy Schadla-Hall, FSA (24 September 1947 – 9 January 2023) was a British archaeologist who specialised in the study of how the archaeological discipline interacts with the public. He was affiliated with the Institute of Archaeology at University College London in Bloomsbury, central London, where he worked as a Reader in Public Archaeology.

== Life and career ==
Schadla-Hall was born on 24 September 1947. He was educated at Bridlington Grammar School, and was also a choirboy at Beverley Minster. Schadla-Hall went to St Catharine's College, Cambridge to study geography. He graduated with a BA in archaeology in 1971, and then completed a post-graduate certificate in education. His first book, Tom Sheppard: Hull's Great Collector, was published in 1989.

From 1985 to 1997, Schadla-Hall and Paul Mellars co-directed an excavation of the Mesolithic settlement site of Star Carr in North Yorkshire; it had previously been excavated by Grahame Clark in the late 1940s and early 1950s.

Schadla-Hall was editor of the journal Public Archaeology and a trustee of the veteran support charity Waterloo Uncovered, which conducts an annual excavation on the site of the Battle of Waterloo with veterans and serving personnel.

On 1 January 1990, Schadla-Hall was elected a Fellow of the Society of Antiquaries of London (FSA).

Schadla-Hall died on 9 January 2023, at the age of 75.

In June 2025, a special issue of the journal Public Archaeology was published in honour of Schadla-Hall, who had been the editor-in-chief of the journal for many years.

== Bibliography ==
=== Books ===
Title	Year	Publisher	Other
Tom Sheppard: Hull's Great Collector	1989		
Art Treasures and War	1998		Co-written with Wojciech W. Kowalski
Public Archaeology	2004		An edited volume, with Nick Merriman
