= Geraldine Talbot =

British archaeologist and librarian

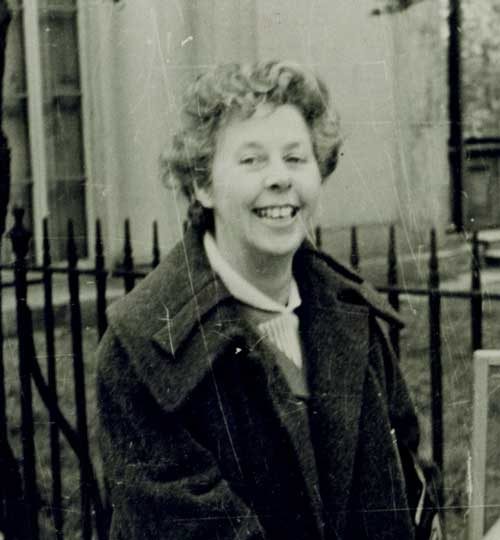
- Geraldine (Gerry) Talbot
- Born: 1907
- Died: 19 September 2000 (aged 92–93); Oxford, United Kingdom
- Education: University of Oxford
- Occupations: Archaeologist and Librarian
- Employer: UCL Institute of Archaeology

Geraldine Talbot (1907 – 19 September 2000) was a British archaeologist and librarian for the Institute of Archaeology Library, University College London.

== Biography ==
Geraldine Talbot was born in 1907. She read modern languages at Oxford. During the Second World War, she joined First Aid Nursing Yeomanry and was a military ambulance driver stationed in Woolwich. She was commissioned at the rank of captain in the Auxiliary Territorial Service.

In 1946, she began her work as the assistant librarian at the Institute of Archaeology, and succeeded Joan du Plat Taylor as the librarian when she retired in 1962. The work of Talbot, du Plat Taylor and Heather Bell who succeeded Talbot as librarian, resulted in the Institute's library being "one of the foremost libraries for Archaeology in Britain." She retired as librarian in 1976.

Her interest in archaeology was in the Near East, and she worked on excavations at Jericho (1952 and 1957), Jerusalem, Petra and Busairah (1973, 1974 and 1980). She was also involved in the British School of Archaeology in Iraq, as Assistant Secretary (1958-1963), Honorary Secretary (1963-1976), and Assistant Secretary (Publications) (1976-1983).

Talbot died on 19 September 2000, aged 92.
