= UCL Institute of Archaeology =

Academic department at UCL

Coordinates: 51°31′30″N 0°7′54″W

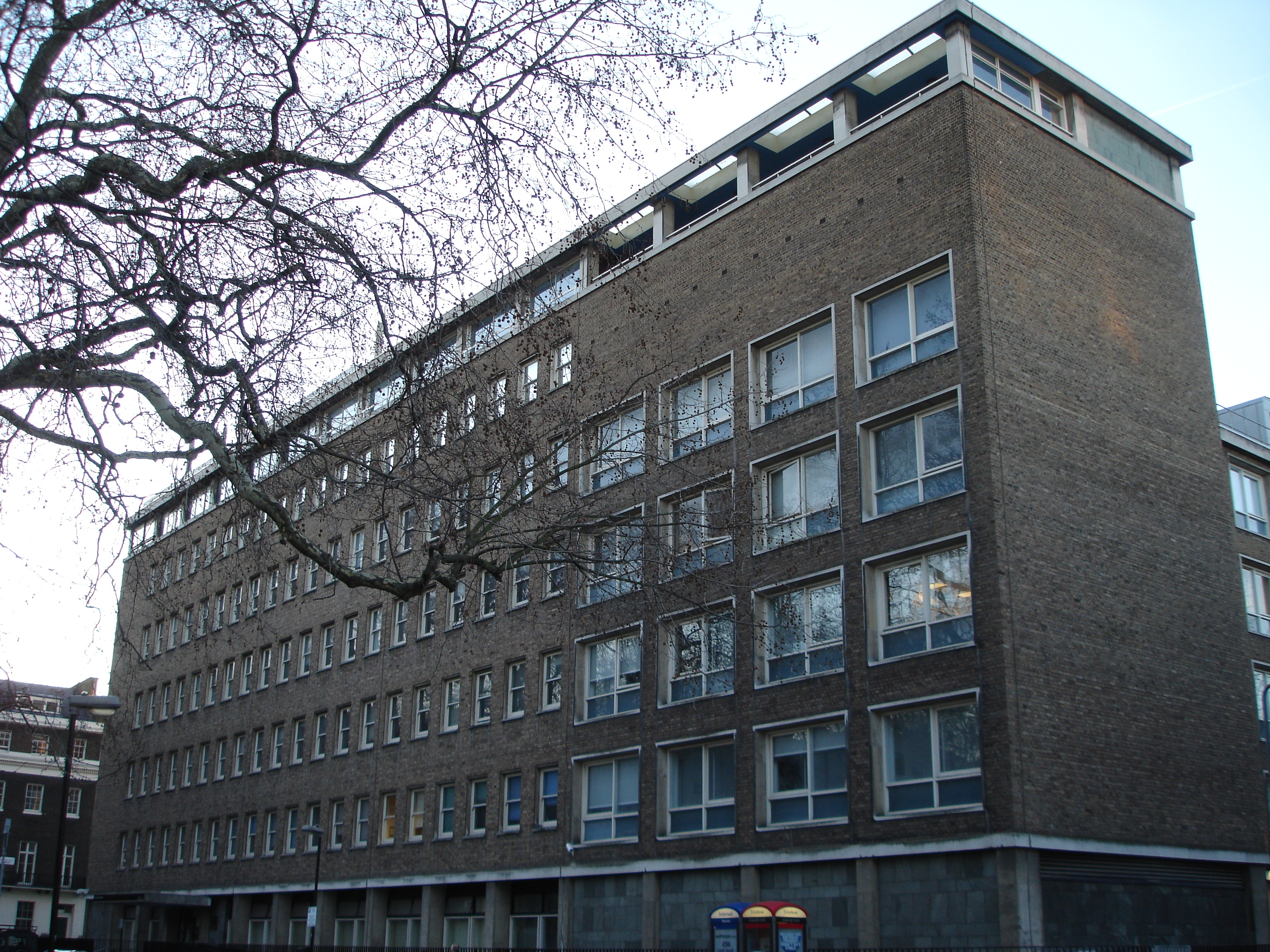
- Established: 1937
- Founders: Mortimer Wheeler
- Director: Kevin MacDonald
- Academic staff: 70
- Students: 650
- Undergraduates: 300
- Postgraduates: 350
- Location: 31–34 Gordon Square, London, UK
- Campus: Urban
- Website: www.ucl.ac.uk/archaeology

UCL's Institute of Archaeology is an academic department of the Social & Historical Sciences Faculty of University College London (UCL) which it joined in 1986 having previously been a school of the University of London. It is currently one of the largest centres for the study of archaeology, cultural heritage and museum studies in the world, with over 100 members of staff and 600 students housed in a 1950s building on the north side of Gordon Square in the Bloomsbury area of Central London.

== History ==
The Institute of Archaeology had its origins in Mortimer Wheeler's vision of a centre for archaeological training in the United Kingdom, which he conceived in the 1920s. Wheeler and Tessa Verney Wheeler, his wife and an archaeologist in her own right, lobbied colleagues and gathered funds to open the institute. The Wheeler's ambitions were realised when the institute was officially opened in 1937, with Mortimer Wheeler as its first director. Among its early members of staff were some of the founding ancestors of archaeology in Britain. Foremost among these, apart from Wheeler himself, was V. Gordon Childe, director from 1946 to 1957, but there were many others, including Kathleen Kenyon, excavator of Jericho, initially secretary then the institute's acting director during World War II; F. E. Zeuner, one of the founders of quaternary studies and of zooarchaeology; Joan du Plat Taylor, the institute's librarian for many years, who was a pioneer of underwater archaeology; Max Mallowan, Professor of Western Asiatic Archaeology (and second husband of Agatha Christie) and Vera Conlon, archaeological photographer and publisher of the textbook Camera Techniques in Archaeology.

Mortimer Wheeler formally resigned as honorary director in 1944 when he became director-general of the Archaeological Survey of India and, at the end of the Second World War, the directorship was awarded to V. Gordon Childe. Following Childe's retirement, this role passed to W. F. Grimes, like Wheeler a former director of the London Museum, and best known today for his 1954 excavation of the London Mithraeum. Following Grimes, the directorship has been held by the Mediterranean prehistorian John Davies Evans; the geographer David R. Harris; Peter Ucko, founder of the World Archaeological Congress; the prehistorian and evolutionary theorist Stephen Shennan and the prehistorian Sue Hamilton. It is currently held by Professor of African Archaeology, Kevin MacDonald. Until 1958, the institute was based at St John's Lodge, Regent's Park, London subsequently moving to purpose-built premises on Gordon Square designed by Booth, Ledeboer, and Pinckheard. The institute taught a diploma until the first BA degree was offered in 1968, followed shortly thereafter by a BSc. The year 2012 marked the institute's 75th anniversary, and a number of events and activities were held to mark this occasion.

== Research and teaching ==
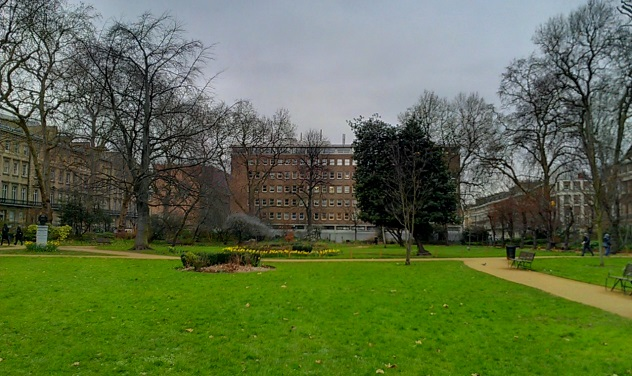
The institute as seen from the south end of Gordon Square

Research at the Institute covers fieldwork, laboratory analysis and conservation, artefact studies, and theoretical, synthetic, and analytical work. Staff projects are currently undertaken on five continents and in the Pacific. A research directory outlining research projects, centres and networks at the Institute of Archaeology is available on the institute's website. Current research projects include:

- The Stones of Stonehenge
- Rapa Nui Landscapes of Construction
- Cultural Evolution of Neolithic Europe
- Imperial Logistics: The Making of the Terracotta Army

In the 2014 Research Excellence Framework (REF), the Institute of Archaeology received the top score of 100% 4* for the excellence of its research environment. Two-thirds (66%) of its research outputs were rated in the 4* or 3* categories (world leading and internationally excellent) while nearly 50% of its research impact was deemed to be of 4* quality.

The institute offers a diverse range of Undergraduate Degrees, Master's degrees and Research Degrees. The Institute of Archaeology was rated number one for Archaeology and Forensics in the Guardian University Guide for 2015 for the fourth year in a row. It has also been ranked in the top two for student satisfaction in the Complete University Guide's 2015 League Table of UK archaeology departments.

In the QS World University Rankings by Subject 2016 UCL is ranked 3rd in the world (and 3rd in Europe) for Archaeology.

== Facilities, collections and library ==
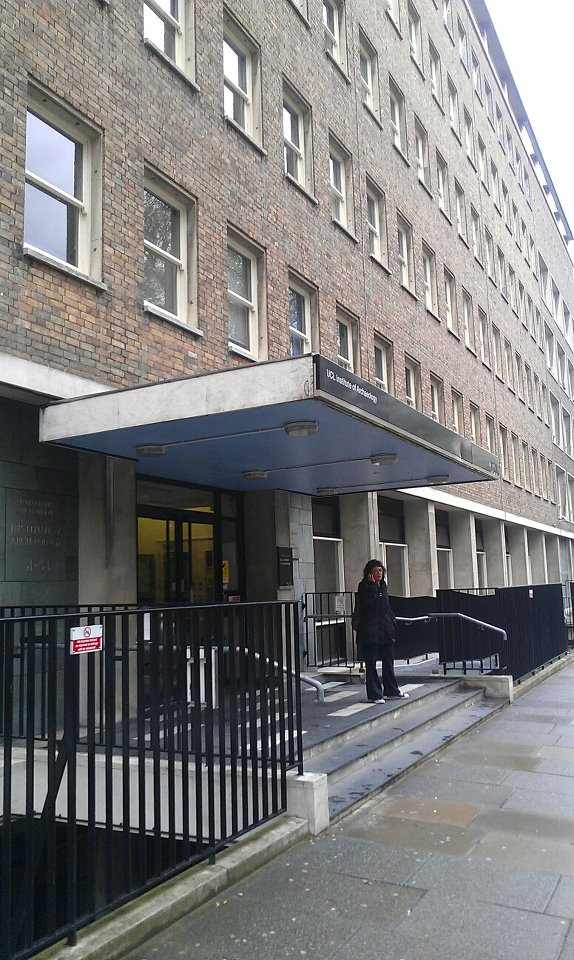
The entrance to the IoA.

Part of the Institute of Archaeology since its early home at St John's Lodge in Regents Park. Moved to Gordon Square in 1958, initially on the first floor and subsequently relocated to the fifth floor. The institute's facilities include the Wolfson Archaeological Science Laboratories and other laboratories for conservation teaching and research, GIS, photography, lithic analysis and for environmental teaching and research activities.

The Institute of Archaeology Collections contain c. 80,000 objects that are used in teaching, research and outreach. Archaeological materials include ceramics, lithics and other objects from a range of periods across Europe, Africa, Egypt, the Levant, Mesopotamia, Pakistan, India, Mesoamerica, South America and the Caribbean. Notable collectors include Flinders Petrie (the Petrie Palestinian Collection), Kathleen Kenyon, Beatrice De Cardi, W. L. Hildburgh, R. G. Gayer-Anderson and Mortimer Wheeler. There are also extensive collections of archaeobotanical and zooarchaeological material which act as primary sources for the identification of plant and animal remains. Further collections of minerals, slag and other materials provide teaching resources for the study of ancient technology.

The A. G. Leventis Gallery of Cypriot and Eastern Mediterranean Archaeology is a public display of part of the collections of the Institute of Archaeology, with objects from ancient Cyprus, Greece, Crete, Egypt and the Levant. The gallery is open Monday to Friday, 9am-5pm; entry is free.

The Institute Library was founded in 1937 to support teaching and learning at the new Institute of Archaeology and has subsequently gained an international reputation as one of the most extensive collections of printed material in the world relating to all aspects of archaeology, museum studies and cultural heritage, largely thanks to the work of the post-war librarians Joan du Plat Taylor, Geraldine Talbot and Heather Bell. The library also contains the Yates Classical Archaeology library and the Edwards Egyptology library. The Institute Library is now part of UCL Library Services. Related collections of interest are to be found in the Main Library (Ancient History, Jewish Studies, Latin American History, History and Classics) and in the DMS Watson (Science Library) (Anthropology, History of Science and Geography).

== Publications ==
The institute publishes research monographs and edited volumes in association with Left Coast Press who also now produce and distribute older Institute of Archaeology publications.

The institute produces the following 'in-house' publications (in conjunction with Ubiquity Press):

- Archaeology International'
- Journal of Conservation and Museum Studies
- Papers from the Institute of Archaeology (PIA)
- Present Pasts

It also published the Bulletin from the Institute of Archaeology from 1954 to 1994 which was superseded by Archaeology International.

Current Institute of Archaeology undergraduate students produce Artifact magazine (available online).

Public Archaeology is a journal sponsored by the institute, launched in 2000 as an international peer-reviewed journal with a focus on the issues of cultural heritage, community archaeology and archaeological practice as it relates to wider civil and governmental concerns. The journal was originally edited by Neal Ascherson and then by Tim Schadla-Hall. Issued quarterly, it was published by James & James Science Publishers until 2007, when the publishing rights were purchased by Maney Publishing.

== Research divisions ==
The Centre for Applied Archaeology (CAA) is a research and support division within UCL's Institute of Archaeology which offers professional advice, support and training in cultural resource management, archaeology, conservation, interpretation and project management. Archaeology South-East (ASE) is the contracts division of the Centre for Applied Archaeology and offers services in all areas of archaeological practice.

The International Centre for Chinese Heritage and Archaeology, based at the institute, is a joint association between the School for Archaeology and Museology of Peking University and UCL's Institute of Archaeology.

== News, events and social media ==
The Institute of Archaeology regularly publishes news and events, including details of seminars, conferences, job opportunities, recent press coverage, publications and other announcements. The institute also has a presence on Facebook, Twitter and YouTube. An annual open day, a 'Festival of World Archaeology', is normally held in June, providing fun, archaeology-related activities for children and adults alike.

== List of directors ==
- 1937 to 1946: Mortimer Wheeler
- 1939 to 1946: Kathleen Kenyon; acting director during World War II
- 1946 to 1957: Professor V. Gordon Childe
- 1957 to 1975: Professor W. F. Grimes
- 1975 to 1989: John Davies Evans
- 1989 to 1996: Professor David R. Harris
- 1996 to 2005: Professor Peter Ucko
- 2005 to 2014: Professor Stephen Shennan
- 2014 to 2022: Professor Sue Hamilton
- 2022 to present: Professor Kevin MacDonald

== Images ==
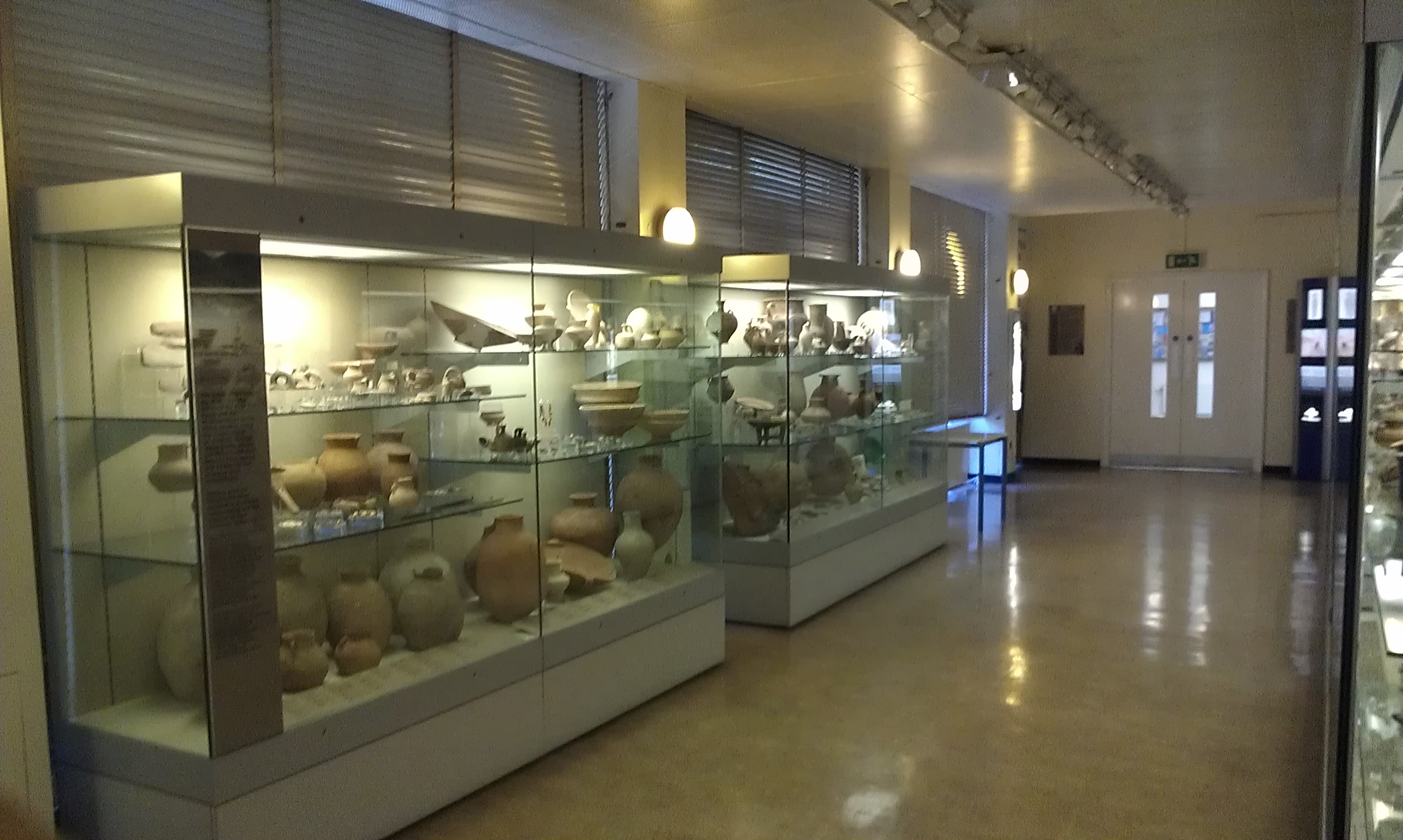
Leventis Gallery

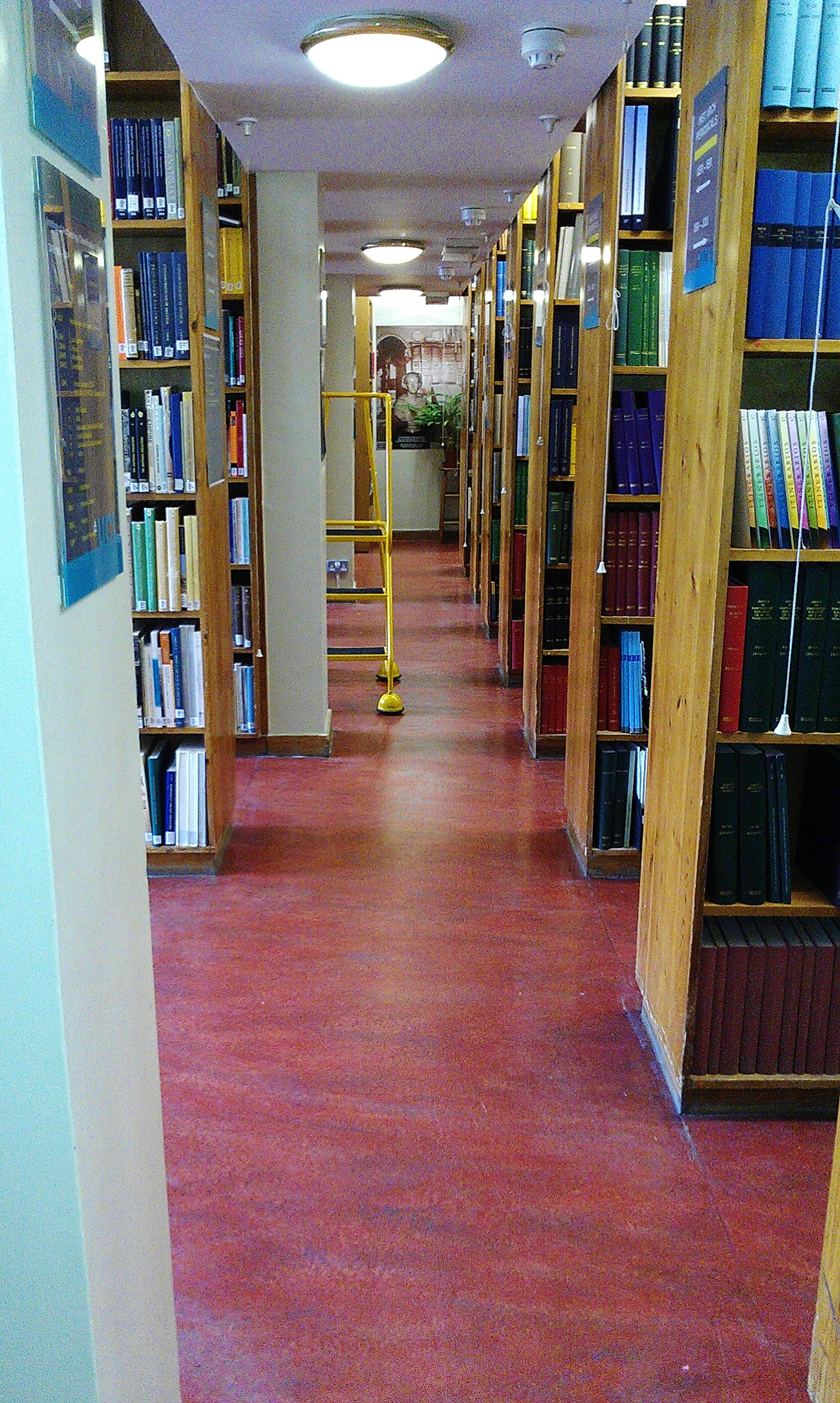
Library
