= Elizabeth Boa =

British scholar of German literature

Elizabeth Boa FBA (b. 1939) is a British scholar of German literature and is Professor Emerita of German at the University of Nottingham. She first joined the University of Nottingham in 1965 and, with the exception of two years at the University of Manchester (1994-1996) spent her career there. She was elected as a Fellow of the British Academy in 2003.

== Select publications ==
- Boa, E. 1987. The Sexual Circus: Wedekind's Theatre of Subversion 1987. Oxford and New York, Blackwell.
- Boa, E. 1996. Kafka: Gender, Class, and Race in the Letters and Fictions. doi:10.1093/acprof:oso/9780198158196.001.0001
- Boa, E. and Palfreyman, R. 2000. Heimat - a German Dream: Regional Loyalties and National Identity in German Culture 1890-1990 2000. Oxford University Press.
