= John Davies Evans =

British archaeologist

John Davies Evans OBE (22 January 1925 – 4 July 2011) was an English archaeologist and academic known for his research into the prehistory of the Mediterranean, and especially the prehistoric cultures of Malta. He was a Director of the Institute of Archaeology in London from 1975 until his retirement in 1989. During his directorship the Institute—the largest archaeology department in the UK and one of the largest in the world—was reorganised from a separate institution within the University of London to one affiliated with University College London, in 1986.

Evans was educated at the Liverpool Institute from where he won an open scholarship to read English at Pembroke College, Cambridge, aged 17. His studies were interrupted by the outbreak of the Second World War, during which he served at Bletchley Park as one of the team involved in breaking each day's new Enigma code settings.

During the 1940s and 1950s Evans excavated a number of the significant Megalithic sites in Malta.
