= Jonathan Gershuny =

British sociologist (born 1949)

Jonathan Gershuny CBE FBA
- Born: Jonathan Israel Gershuny; 16 September 1949 (age 77)
- Citizenship: British
- Known for: Time-use research, Multinational Time Use Study, self-service economy
- Awards: Fellow of the British Academy (2002); Market Research Society Silver Medal (1986); Commander of the Order of the British Empire (2017)

Academic background
- Education: Loughborough University (BSc); University of Strathclyde (MSc); University of Sussex (DPhil)

Academic work
- Discipline: Sociology, economic sociology
- Sub-discipline: Time-use research, household organisation, social change
- Institutions: University College London; University of Oxford; University of Essex; University of Bath; University of Sussex

Jonathan Israel Gershuny CBE FBA (born 16 September 1949) is a British sociologist and Professor of Economic Sociology at University College London (UCL). He is also emeritus professor of sociology at the University of Oxford.

Gershuny was appointed a Commander of the Order of the British Empire (CBE) in the 2017.

Gershuny's research has examined the distribution of time between paid employment, unpaid domestic work and leisure. He developed the Multinational Time Use Study (MTUS) in the 1980s and has continued as its principal investigator.

== Education ==
Gershuny studied social sciences at Loughborough University. He graduated with a Bachelor of Science degree in 1971. He completed a master's degree in research methods in political science at the University of Strathclyde in 1972. In 1977, he received a DPhil in the History and Social Studies of Science from the University of Sussex.

== Academic career ==
Gershuny was a research fellow from 1974 to 1984 at the Science Policy Research Unit at the University of Sussex. In 1984, he became Professor of Sociology at the University of Bath.

In 1990, he joined Nuffield College, Oxford, as a faculty fellow. From 1993 to 2006, he was Professor of Economic Sociology at the University of Essex and Principle Investigator for the British Household Panel Study. He directed the Institute for Social and Economic Research, which developed from the Economic and Social Research Council's Research Centre for Micro-social Change.

In 2006, Gershuny returned to the University of Oxford as Statutory Professor of Sociology and a fellow of St Hugh's College, Oxford. He served as head of Oxford's Department of Sociology from 2009 to 2011 and became a senior research fellow at Nuffield College.

In 2019, he joined University College London as Professor of Economic Sociology in the Social Research Institute. He retained an emeritus professorship at Oxford.

== Research ==
Gershuny's early research examined changes in the organisation of work and consumption in industrialised societies. In his book After Industrial Society? The Emerging Self-service Economy (1978), he argued that increasing ownership of manufactured goods enabled households to perform activities previously supplied through commercial services.

During the 1980s, Gershuny initiated the Multinational Time Use Study. The study provides standardised information on the time individuals allocate to paid work, household activities, personal care and leisure.

The MTUS is maintained by the Centre for Time Use Research and has also been associated with the Integrated Public Use Microdata Series (IPUMS), which provides access to harmonised population and survey data.

Gershuny established the UK Centre for Time Use Research (CTUR) in 2004 with support from the Economic and Social Research Council (ESRC).

Gershuny and sociologist Oriel Sullivan have collaborated on research concerning changes in the gender division of paid and unpaid work.

In a 2025 discussion paper published by the Economic Statistics Centre of Excellence, titled "Time-use and economic activity: inputs, outputs and outcomes", Gershuny examined the relationship between time allocation and economic measurement, including the treatment of household production in national accounting.

A 2025 study co-authored by Gershuny, Sofia Madsen, Bo Topcu and Pedersen Weidema addressed this subject in the Review of Economics of the Household.

== Honours and recognition ==
Gershuny was elected a Fellow of the British Academy in 2002. From 2006 to 2009, he chaired the academy's Sociology, Demography and Social Statistics Section. He is also a Fellow of the Academy of Social Sciences.

He received the Silver Medal of the Market Research Society in 1986 for his work on time use, technology and the future of employment.

Gershuny served as co-chair, alongside Rudolph Andorka, and subsequently chair of the International Association for Time Use Research between 1988 and 2000.

In 1999, he delivered the first of the Millennium Lectures at 10 Downing Street.

Gershuny was appointed a Commander of the Order of the British Empire (CBE) in the 2017 honours for services to the social sciences and sociology.

== Personal life ==
Gershuny married Esther Sadie in 1974. They have two children.

== Selected publications ==
=== Books ===
- Gershuny, Jonathan (1978). After Industrial Society? The Emerging Self-service Economy. Macmillan. ISBN 9780333232750.
- Gershuny, Jonathan (1983). Social Innovation and the Division of Labour. Oxford University Press. ISBN 0198741308.
- Anderson, Michael; Bechhofer, Frank; Gershuny, Jonathan (1994). The Social and Political Economy of the Household. Oxford University Press. ISBN 0198279388.
- Gershuny, Jonathan (2000). Changing Times: Work and Leisure in Postindustrial Society. Oxford University Press. doi:10.1093/oso/9780198287872.001.0001. ISBN 9780198287872.
- Berthoud, Richard; Gershuny, Jonathan (2000). Seven Years in the Lives of British Families: Evidence on the Dynamics of Social Change from the British Household Panel Survey. Policy Press.
- Gershuny, Jonathan; Sullivan, Oriel (2019). What We Really Do All Day: Insights from the Centre for Time Use Research. Pelican. ISBN 9780241285565.

=== Journal articles and research papers ===
- Gershuny, Jonathan (1995). "Time budget research in Europe". Statistics in Transition. 2 (4): 529–551.
- Kan, Man Yee; Sullivan, Oriel; Gershuny, Jonathan (2011). "Gender Convergence in Domestic Work: Discerning the Effects of Interactional and Institutional Barriers from Large-Scale Data". Sociology. 45 (2): 234–251. doi:10.1177/0038038510390045.
- Fisher, Kimberly; Gershuny, Jonathan (2013). "Coming full circle – introducing the Multinational Time Use Study Simple File". Electronic International Journal of Time Use Research. 10 (1): 91–96. doi:10.13085/eIJTUR.10.1.91-96.
- Gershuny, Jonathan; Harms, Teresa (2016). "Housework Now Takes Much Less Time: 85 Years of US Rural Women's Time Use". Social Forces. 95 (2): 503–524. doi:10.1093/sf/sow073.
- Sullivan, Oriel; Gershuny, Jonathan (2018). "Speed-Up Society? Evidence from the UK 2000 and 2015 Time Use Diary Surveys". Sociology. 52 (1): 20–38. doi:10.1177/0038038517712914.
- Gershuny, Jonathan (2025). Time-use and economic activity: inputs, outputs and outcomes (PDF) (Report). ESCoE Discussion Paper. Economic Statistics Centre of Excellence.
- Madsen, Sofia; Topcu, Bo; Weidema, Pedersen; Gershuny, Jonathan (2025). "Uncovering Consumption Inequalities by Integrating Household Activity Patterns in UK Input-Output Tables". Review of Economics of the Household. doi:10.1007/s11150-025-09792-3.
