= Stephen Shennan =

British archaeologist

Stephen Shennan, FBA (born 9 May 1949) is a British archaeologist and academic. Since 1996, he has been Professor of Theoretical Archaeology. He was Director of the Institute of Archaeology at the University College London from 2005 to 2014.

Shennan was educated at the Becket School, West Bridgford, and Fitzwilliam College, Cambridge, where he received BA (1971) and PhD (1977) degrees in Archaeology. He focuses on cultural evolution and Darwinian archaeology, applying theories from evolutionary ecology and cladistics to archaeology. In July 2006, Shennan was elected Fellow of the British Academy. Shennan was also awarded the RAI Huxley Medal 2021.

== Selected works ==
- Shennan, Stephen (1985). Experiments in the collection and analysis of archaeological survey data: the east Hampshire survey. Sheffield: University of Sheffield. ISBN 0906090229.
- Shennan, Stephen, ed. (1989). Archaeological approaches to cultural identity. London: Routledge. ISBN 0044450168.
- Shennan, Stephen (1997). Quantifying archaeology (2nd ed.). Iowa City: University of Iowa Press. ISBN 0877455988.
- Shennan, Stephen (2002). Genes, memes and human history: Darwinian archaeology and cultural evolution. London: Thames & Hudson. ISBN 0500051186.
- Layton, Robert; Shennan, Stephen; Stone, Peter, eds. (2007). A future for archaeology: the past in the present. Walnut Creek: Left Coast Press. ISBN 978-1598742145.
- Renfrew, Colin; Shennan, Stephen, eds. (2009). Ranking, Resource and Exchange: Aspect of the Archaeology of Early European Society. London: Cambridge University Press. ISBN 978-0521105095.
- Shennan, Stephen (2018). The First Farmers of Europe: An Evolutionary Perspective. Cambridge University Press. ISBN 9781108386029.
