= Alfred Joseph Knight =

British Army officer (1888–1960)

- Born: 24 August 1888; Birmingham, West Midlands, England
- Died: 4 December 1960 (aged 72); Birmingham, West Midlands, England
- Burial place: Oscott College Road Cemetery, Sutton Coldfield
- Military career
- Allegiance: United Kingdom
- Branch: British Army
- Service years: 1914−1919
- Rank: Second Lieutenant
- Service number: 370995
- Units: London Regiment; Sherwood Foresters
- Conflicts: World War I
- Awards: Victoria Cross; Order of the British Empire

Second Lieutenant Alfred Joseph Knight, VC, MBE (24 August 1888 − 4 December 1960) was a British Army officer and an English recipient of the Victoria Cross (VC), the highest and most prestigious award for gallantry in the face of the enemy that can be awarded to British and Commonwealth forces. He was the only Post Office Rifleman ever to receive this award.

== Early life ==
Born at Ladywood in Birmingham on 24 August 1888, he attended St. Philip's School (more correctly St Philip's Grammar School), Edgbaston. He married Mabel Saunderson in May 1915. He joined the Post Office and worked as a Clerical Assistant in the North Midland Engineering District.

== World War I ==
Knight was 29 years old, and a sergeant in the 2/8th (City of London) Battalion, The London Regiment (Post Office Rifles), British Army during the First World War when the action took place for which he was awarded the VC.

On 20 September 1917 at Alberta Section, Ypres, Belgium, when his platoon came under very heavy fire from an enemy machine-gun, Sergeant Knight rushed through his unit's own barrage and captured the emplacement single-handed. He performed several other acts of conspicuous bravery single-handed, all under heavy machine-gun and rifle fire and without regard to personal safety. All the platoon officers of the company had become casualties before the first objective was reached, and this NCO took command not only of all the men of his own platoon but of the platoons without officers and his energy in consolidating and reorganising was untiring.

He later achieved the rank of second lieutenant.

== Later life ==
After the war he was transferred to the Ministry of Labour and was Manager of the Employment Exchange at When he retired in 1951 he was Senior Wages Inspector in the Midlands section of the Ministry of Labour. He was appointed a Member of the Order of the British Empire in 1951. Alfred Knight was a member of the Catholic organisation The Catenian Association holding a number of senior offices.

In 2005, Birmingham City Council named a street in his honour on the Park Central development in Ladywood, where Alfred Knight grew up.

In 2017, Royal Mail dedicated a postbox in honour of Knight. The postbox is located at the corner of Islington Row Middleway and Tennant Street, Birmingham, B15 1LA, on the street where Alfred lived when he worked for the GPO (although the same press release states that he was working as a clerk in Nottingham when he enlisted in the 2/8th Battalion of the Post Office Rifles.).

Alfred Knight died at home at the age of 72. He is buried in Oscott Catholic Cemetery, New Oscott, Birmingham.

== The Medal ==
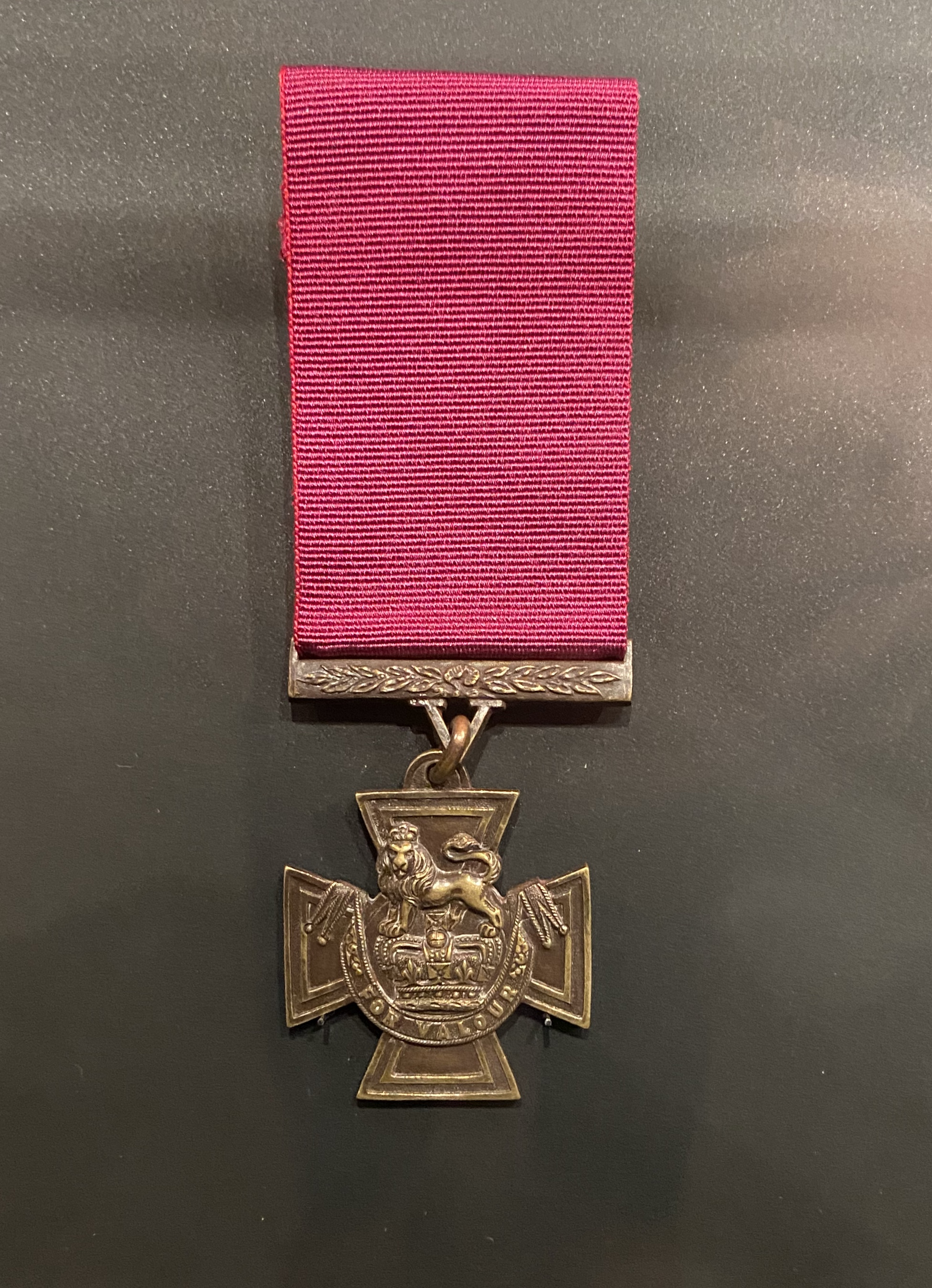
Alfred Knight's VC.

His medal is held by the British Postal Museum & Archive.

== Bibliography ==
- Snelling, Stephen (2012) [1998]. Passchendaele 1917. VCs of the First World War. The History Press. ISBN 978-0752476667.
