= Miriam Glucksmann =

British sociologist and academic

Miriam A. Glucksmann FBA is a British sociologist and academic, emeritus professor of sociology at the University of Essex, and visiting professor of sociology at the London School of Economics. In 1998, Glucksman was a Fellow at the Swedish Collegium for Advanced Study in Uppsala, Sweden.

== Early life ==
She studied at the London School of Economics.

== Selected publications ==
- Structuralist Analysis in Contemporary Social Thought (1974) Routledge, London
- Women on the Line (1982) Routledge, London
- Women Assemble: Women Workers and the 'New Industries' in Inter-war Britain (1990) Routledge, London
- Cottons and Casuals: the Gendered Organisation of Labour in Time and Space (2000) Sociologypress, Durham
- A New Sociology of Work? (2006) Blackwell Publishing, Eds. L. Pettinger, J. Parry, R. Taylor and M. Glucksmann
