= Anthony Ogus =

Anthony Ian Ogus (1945 - 10 March 2026) CBE FBA was an emeritus professor of law at the University of Manchester and the Erasmus University Rotterdam and a pre-eminent scholar in the field of regulation and economic analysis of law. He also wrote and lectured on opera, and recorded English literature for LibriVox.

== Publications ==
Books

- Law of Damages (1973)
- with E Barendt and N Wikeley, Law of Social Security (1st edn 1978, 5th edn 2002)
- Readings in the Economics of Law and Regulation (1984, with Veljanovski)
- Regulation: Legal Form and Economic Theory (Clarendon 1994, reprinted 2004)
- Controlling the Regulators (1998, with Froud and others)
- Regulation, Economics and the Law (2001)
- Économie du droit: le cas francais (2002, with Faure)
- Costs and Cautionary Tales: Economic Insights for the Law (2006) joint winner of Socio-Legal Studies Association Book Prize 2007
- Travels with my Opera Glasses (2013)

Articles

- 'What Legal Scholars Can Learn From Law and Economics' (2004) 79 Chicago-Kent Law Review 383–402
- 'The Economic Base of Legal Culture: Networks and Monopolization' (2002) 22 Oxford Journal of Legal Studies 419–434
- with N Garoupa, 'A Strategic Interpretation of Legal Transplants' (2006) 36(2) Journal of Legal Studies
- 'The Paradoxes of Legal Paternalism and How to Resolve Them' (2010) 30 Legal Studies 61–73
- 'Rethinking Self-Regulation' (1995) 15 OJLS 97–108
- 'Competition between National Legal Systems: A Contribution of Economic Analysis to Comparative Law' (1999) 48 ICLQ 405–418

== See also ==
- Regulation
- Environmental law
- Law and economics
