= List of United Kingdom locations: Ros-Rz =

The United Kingdom

This is part of the list of United Kingdom locations: a gazetteer of place names in the United Kingdom showing each place's locality and geographical coordinates.

== Ro (continued) ==
=== Ros ===
Location	Locality	Coordinates (links to map & photo sources)	OS grid reference
Roscroggan	Cornwall	50.23°N 05.31°W	SW6442
Rose	Cornwall	50.34°N 05.13°W	SW7754
Roseacre	Kent	51.26°N 00.56°E	TQ7955
Roseacre	Lancashire	53.81°N 02.86°W	SD4336
Rose-an-Grouse	Cornwall	50.16°N 05.46°W	SW5335
Rose Ash	Devon	50.97°N 03.73°W	SS7821
Rosebank	East Dunbartonshire	55.93°N 04.13°W	NS6773
Rosebank	South Lanarkshire	55.72°N 03.91°W	NS8049
Rosebery	Midlothian	55.80°N 03.11°W	NT3057
Rosebush	Pembrokeshire	51.92°N 04.80°W	SN0729
Rosecare	Cornwall	50.72°N 04.60°W	SX1695
Rosedale	Hertfordshire	51.70°N 00.06°W	TL3403
Rosedale Abbey	North Yorkshire	54.34°N 00.89°W	SE7295
Rosedinnick	Cornwall	50.44°N 04.94°W	SW9165
Rosedown	Devon	50.98°N 04.46°W	SS2724
Rose Green	Essex	51.91°N 00.76°E	TL9028
Rose Green (Assington)	Suffolk	51.99°N 00.81°E	TL9337
Rose Green (Lindsey)	Suffolk	52.05°N 00.87°E	TL9744
Rose Green	West Sussex	50.78°N 00.72°W	SZ9099
Rose Grove	Lancashire	53.78°N 02.28°W	SD8132
Rosehall	North Lanarkshire	55.84°N 04.03°W	NS7363
Rosehearty	Aberdeenshire	57.69°N 02.11°W	NJ9367
Rose Hill	Bolton	53.56°N 02.43°W	SD7108
Rose Hill	Buckinghamshire	51.54°N 00.67°W	SU9284
Rose Hill	City of Derby	52.91°N 01.48°W	SK3535
Rose Hill	East Sussex	50.92°N 00.06°E	TQ4516
Rose Hill	Lancashire	53.77°N 02.25°W	SD8331
Rose Hill	Oxfordshire	51.72°N 01.23°W	SP5303
Rose Hill	Suffolk	52.04°N 01.17°E	TM1843
Rose Hill	Surrey	51.22°N 00.33°W	TQ1649
Rose Hill	Sutton	51.37°N 00.19°W	TQ2666
Rosehill	City of Aberdeen	57.16°N 02.15°W	NJ9108
Rosehill (Perranzabuloe)	Cornwall	50.34°N 05.12°W	SW7854
Rosehill (Lanivet)	Cornwall	50.44°N 04.77°W	SX0364
Rosehill	Lancashire	53.68°N 02.45°W	SD7021
Rosehill	North Tyneside	54.98°N 01.51°W	NZ3166
Rosehill	Pembrokeshire	51.79°N 05.06°W	SM8915
Rosehill	Shropshire	52.86°N 02.50°W	SJ6630
Rosehill	Trafford	53.37°N 02.36°W	SJ7686
Roseland	Cornwall	50.44°N 04.43°W	SX2763
Roselands	East Sussex	50.77°N 00.29°E	TQ6200
Rosemarket	Pembrokeshire	51.73°N 04.97°W	SM9508
Rosemarkie	Highland	57.58°N 04.12°W	NH7357
Rosemary Lane	Devon	50.91°N 03.21°W	ST1514
Rosemelling	Cornwall	50.38°N 04.75°W	SX0457
Rosemergy	Cornwall	50.16°N 05.62°W	SW4136
Rosemount	City of Aberdeen	57.14°N 02.11°W	NJ9306
Rosemount	Perth and Kinross	56.57°N 03.32°W	NO1943
Rosemullion Head	Cornwall	50.10°N 05.08°W	SW792277
Rosenannon	Cornwall	50.45°N 04.88°W	SW9566
Rosenithon	Cornwall	50.04°N 05.07°W	SW8021
Roser's Cross	East Sussex	50.9642°N 0.2060°E	TQ5520
Rose Valley	Pembrokeshire	51.66°N 04.89°W	SN0000
Rosevean	Cornwall	50.38°N 04.78°W	SX0258
Rosevear	Cornwall	50.07°N 05.22°W	SW6924
Roseville	Dudley	52.53°N 02.10°W	SO9393
Rosevine	Cornwall	50.18°N 04.98°W	SW8736
Rosewarne (Camborne)	Cornwall	50.21°N 05.30°W	SW6440
Rosewarne (Gwinear-Gwithian)	Cornwall	50.17°N 05.34°W	SW6136
Rosewell	Midlothian	55.84°N 03.15°W	NT2862
Roseworth	Stockton-on-Tees	54.58°N 01.35°W	NZ4221
Roseworthy (Gwinear-Gwithian)	Cornwall	50.20°N 05.35°W	SW6139
Roseworthy (Kenwyn)	Cornwall	50.28°N 05.10°W	SW7947
Roseworthy Barton	Cornwall	50.20°N 05.35°W	SW6139
Rosgill	Cumbria	54.53°N 02.72°W	NY5316
Rosherville	Kent	51.44°N 00.34°E	TQ6374
Roshven	Highland	56.83°N 05.77°W	NM7078
Rosinish	Western Isles	56.85°N 07.55°W	NL616870
Roskear Croft	Cornwall	50.22°N 05.29°W	SW6541
Roskhill	Highland	57.41°N 06.54°W	NG2745
Roskorwell	Cornwall	50.06°N 05.08°W	SW7923
Rosley	Cumbria	54.79°N 03.05°W	NY3245
Roslin	Midlothian	55.85°N 03.16°W	NT2763
Rosliston	Derbyshire	52.74°N 01.64°W	SK2416
Rosneath	Argyll and Bute	56.00°N 04.80°W	NS2583
Ross	Dumfries and Galloway	54.77°N 04.11°W	NX6444
Ross	Northumberland	55.62°N 01.79°W	NU1337
Ross	Scottish Borders	55.83°N 02.06°W	NT9660
Rossay	Western Isles	57.86°N 06.71°W	NG204953
Rossett	Wrexham	53.10°N 02.95°W	SJ3657
Rossett Green	North Yorkshire	53.96°N 01.54°W	SE3052
Ross Green	Worcestershire	52.24°N 02.35°W	SO7661
Rossie Island	Angus	56.69°N 02.49°W	NO7056
Rossington	Doncaster	53.47°N 01.06°W	SK6298
Rossland	Renfrewshire	55.89°N 04.49°W	NS4470
Rossmore	Poole	50.73°N 01.93°W	SZ0593
Ross-on-Wye	Herefordshire	51.91°N 02.58°W	SO6024
Roster	Highland	58.34°N 03.28°W	ND2540
Rostherne	Cheshire	53.34°N 02.39°W	SJ7483
Rostholme	Doncaster	53.54°N 01.15°W	SE5606
Rosthwaite (Borrowdale)	Cumbria	54.51°N 03.16°W	NY2514
Rosthwaite (Broughton West)	Cumbria	54.30°N 03.16°W	SD2490
Roston	Derbyshire	52.96°N 01.80°W	SK1341
Rosudgeon	Cornwall	50.11°N 05.42°W	SW5529
Rosyth	Fife	56.03°N 03.44°W	NT1083

=== Rot ===
Location	Locality	Coordinates (links to map & photo sources)	OS grid reference
Rotchfords	Essex	51.93°N 00.80°E	TL9330
Rotcombe	Bath and North East Somerset	51.32°N 02.51°W	ST6458
Rothbury	Northumberland	55.30°N 01.92°W	NU0501
Rotherbridge	West Sussex	50.97°N 00.63°W	SU9620
Rotherby	Leicestershire	52.73°N 01.00°W	SK6716
Rotherfield	East Sussex	51.03°N 00.20°E	TQ5529
Rotherfield Greys	Oxfordshire	51.53°N 00.96°W	SU7282
Rotherfield Peppard	Oxfordshire	51.52°N 00.97°W	SU7181
Rotherham	South Yorkshire	53.42°N 01.35°W	SK4392
Rotherhithe	Southwark	51.49°N 00.05°W	TQ3579
Rothersthorpe	Northamptonshire	52.19°N 00.96°W	SP7156
Rotherwas	Herefordshire	52.03°N 02.68°W	SO5338
Rotherwick	Hampshire	51.29°N 00.98°W	SU7156
Rothes	Moray	57.52°N 03.22°W	NJ2749
Rothesay	Argyll and Bute	55.83°N 05.06°W	NS0864
Rothienorman	Aberdeenshire	57.40°N 02.46°W	NJ7235
Rothiesholm	Orkney Islands	59.09°N 02.66°W	HY6223
Rothley	Leicestershire	52.70°N 01.14°W	SK5812
Rothley Plain	Leicestershire	52.71°N 01.17°W	SK5613
Rothney	Aberdeenshire	57.33°N 02.61°W	NJ6327
Rothwell	Leeds	53.74°N 01.48°W	SE3428
Rothwell	Lincolnshire	53.47°N 00.26°W	TF1599
Rothwell	Northamptonshire	52.42°N 00.81°W	SP8181
Rothwell Haigh	Leeds	53.74°N 01.48°W	SE3428
Rotsea	East Riding of Yorkshire	53.94°N 00.38°W	TA0651
Rottal	Angus	56.80°N 03.04°W	NO3669
Rotten End	Essex	51.93°N 00.50°E	TL7229
Rotten Green	Hampshire	51.28°N 00.86°W	SU7955
Rotten Row	Berkshire	51.43°N 01.16°W	SU5871
Rotten Row	Solihull	52.37°N 01.73°W	SP1875
Rottingdean	Brighton and Hove	50.80°N 00.05°W	TQ3702
Rottington	Cumbria	54.50°N 03.60°W	NX9613
Rotton Park	Birmingham	52.48°N 01.94°W	SP0487

=== Rou ===
Location	Locality	Coordinates (links to map & photo sources)	OS grid reference
Roud	Isle of Wight	50.61°N 01.28°W	SZ5180
Roudham	Norfolk	52.447°N 0.876°E	TL9587
Rougham	Norfolk	52.74°N 00.71°E	TF8320
Rougham	Suffolk	52.21°N 00.79°E	TL9161
Rougham Green	Suffolk	52.21°N 00.78°E	TL9061
Rough Bank	Rochdale	53.60°N 02.09°W	SD9412
Roughbirchworth	Barnsley	53.50°N 01.60°W	SE2601
Rough Close	Staffordshire	52.94°N 02.12°W	SJ9239
Rough Common	Kent	51.29°N 01.03°E	TR1259
Roughcote	City of Stoke-on-Trent, Staffordshire	52.99°N 02.09°W	SJ9444
Rough Haugh	Highland	58.40°N 04.19°W	NC7248
Rough Hay	Staffordshire	52.80°N 01.70°W	SK2023
Roughlee	Lancashire	53.85°N 02.24°W	SD8440
Roughley	Birmingham	52.58°N 01.82°W	SP1299
Roughmoor	Somerset	51.01°N 03.14°W	ST2025
Roughmoor	Swindon	51.57°N 01.84°W	SU1186
Roughpark	Aberdeenshire	57.19°N 03.09°W	NJ3412
Roughrigg	North Lanarkshire	55.90°N 03.88°W	NS8270
Roughsike	Cumbria	55.06°N 02.75°W	NY5275
Roughton	Lincolnshire	53.15°N 00.14°W	TF2464
Roughton	Norfolk	52.88°N 01.28°E	TG2137
Roughton	Shropshire	52.54°N 02.37°W	SO7594
Roughton Moor	Lincolnshire	53.15°N 00.19°W	TF2164
Roughway	Kent	51.24°N 00.31°E	TQ6252
Roundbush	Essex	51.67°N 00.67°E	TL8501
Round Bush	Hertfordshire	51.66°N 00.35°W	TQ1498
Roundbush Green	Essex	51.80°N 00.30°E	TL5914
Round Green	Luton	51.88°N 00.41°W	TL0922
Roundham	Somerset	50.87°N 02.82°W	ST4209
Roundhay	Leeds	53.82°N 01.50°W	SE3337
Round Maple	Suffolk	52.05°N 00.84°E	TL9543
Round Oak	Dudley	52.48°N 02.11°W	SO9287
Round Oak	Shropshire	52.45°N 02.89°W	SO3984
Rounds Green	Sandwell	52.49°N 02.03°W	SO9889
Roundshaw	Sutton	51.35°N 00.13°W	TQ3063
Round Spinney	Northamptonshire	52.27°N 00.84°W	SP7965
Round Street	Kent	51.38°N 00.37°E	TQ6568
Roundstreet Common	West Sussex	51.04°N 00.50°W	TQ0528
Roundswell	Devon	51.05°N 04.08°W	SS5431
Roundthorn	Trafford	53.38°N 02.30°W	SJ8088
Roundthwaite	Cumbria	54.42°N 02.61°W	NY6003
Roundway	Wiltshire	51.36°N 01.98°W	SU0163
Roundyhill	Angus	56.63°N 03.02°W	NO3750
Rousay	Orkney Islands	59.17°N 03.04°W	HY406320
Rousdon	Devon	50.71°N 03.00°W	SY2991
Rousham	Oxfordshire	51.91°N 01.31°W	SP4724
Rous Lench	Worcestershire	52.17°N 01.98°W	SP0153
Routh	East Riding of Yorkshire	53.86°N 00.34°W	TA0942
Rout's Green	Buckinghamshire	51.67°N 00.87°W	SU7898

=== Row ===
Location	Locality	Coordinates (links to map & photo sources)	OS grid reference
Row	Cornwall	50.55°N 04.69°W	SX0976
Row (Eden)	Cumbria	54.70°N 02.59°W	NY6234
Row (Allerdale)	Cumbria	54.29°N 02.84°W	SD4589
Rowanburn	Dumfries and Galloway	55.08°N 02.94°W	NY4077
Rowanfield	Gloucestershire	51.89°N 02.11°W	SO9222
Rowardennan	Stirling	56.15°N 04.64°W	NS3699
Rowarth	Derbyshire	53.39°N 01.98°W	SK0189
Row Ash	Hampshire	50.91°N 01.23°W	SU5413
Rowbarton	Somerset	51.01°N 03.11°W	ST2225
Rowberrow	Somerset	51.31°N 02.79°W	ST4558
Row Brow	Cumbria	54.71°N 03.42°W	NY0836
Rowde	Wiltshire	51.35°N 02.04°W	ST9762
Rowden	Devon	50.76°N 03.93°W	SX6498
Rowden	North Yorkshire	54.00°N 01.61°W	SE2557
Rowe Head	Cumbria	54.18°N 03.13°W	SD2677
Rowen	Conwy	53.22°N 03.87°W	SH7571
Rowfoot	Northumberland	54.93°N 02.50°W	NY6860
Rowford	Somerset	51.03°N 03.09°W	ST2327
Row Green	Essex	51.85°N 00.52°E	TL7420
Row Heath	Essex	51.82°N 01.11°E	TM1519
Rowhedge	Essex	51.85°N 00.93°E	TM0221
Row Hill	Surrey	51.35°N 00.52°W	TQ0363
Rowhook	West Sussex	51.09°N 00.40°W	TQ1234
Rowington	Warwickshire	52.31°N 01.70°W	SP2069
Rowington Green	Warwickshire	52.31°N 01.70°W	SP2069
Rowland	Derbyshire	53.24°N 01.68°W	SK2172
Rowlands Castle	Hampshire	50.88°N 00.96°W	SU7310
Rowlands Gill	Durham	54.91°N 01.75°W	NZ1658
Rowland's Green	Gloucestershire	52.02°N 02.46°W	SO6836
Rowledge	Surrey	51.18°N 00.82°W	SU8243
Rowlestone	Herefordshire	51.93°N 02.91°W	SO3727
Rowley	East Riding of Yorkshire	53.78°N 00.52°W	SE9732
Rowley	Shropshire	52.64°N 03.03°W	SJ3006
Rowley Green	Hertfordshire	51.65°N 00.25°W	TQ2196
Rowley Hill	Kirklees	53.62°N 01.71°W	SE1914
Rowley Park	Staffordshire	52.79°N 02.13°W	SJ9122
Rowley Regis	Sandwell	52.48°N 02.06°W	SO9687
Rowley's Green	Coventry	52.44°N 01.50°W	SP3483
Rowling	Kent	51.24°N 01.25°E	TR2754
Rowly	Surrey	51.15°N 00.51°W	TQ0440
Rownall	Staffordshire	53.03°N 02.07°W	SJ9549
Rowner	Hampshire	50.80°N 01.17°W	SU5801
Rowney Green	Worcestershire	52.33°N 01.94°W	SP0471
Rownhams	Hampshire	50.95°N 01.46°W	SU3817
Row-of-trees	Cheshire	53.30°N 02.27°W	SJ8279
Rowrah	Cumbria	54.54°N 03.47°W	NY0518
Rowsham	Buckinghamshire	51.85°N 00.78°W	SP8418
Rowsley	Derbyshire	53.19°N 01.62°W	SK2566
Rowstock	Oxfordshire	51.59°N 01.32°W	SU4789
Rowston	Lincolnshire	53.09°N 00.38°W	TF0856
Rowthorne	Derbyshire	53.17°N 01.29°W	SK4764
Rowton	Cheshire	53.17°N 02.83°W	SJ4464
Rowton (Alberbury with Cardeston)	Shropshire	52.70°N 02.94°W	SJ3612
Rowton (Telford and Wrekin)	Shropshire	52.76°N 02.57°W	SJ6119
Rowton Moor	Cheshire	53.17°N 02.83°W	SJ4464
Row Town	Surrey	51.35°N 00.50°W	TQ0463

=== Rox ===
Location	Locality	Coordinates (links to map & photo sources)	OS grid reference
Roxburgh	Scottish Borders	55.56°N 02.49°W	NT6930
Roxburgh Mains	Scottish Borders	55.55°N 02.50°W	NT6829
Roxby	North Lincolnshire	53.63°N 00.61°W	SE9216
Roxby	North Yorkshire	54.53°N 00.82°W	NZ7616
Roxeth	Harrow	51.56°N 00.35°W	TQ1486
Roxton	Bedford	52.17°N 00.31°W	TL1554
Roxwell	Essex	51.74°N 00.37°E	TL6408

=== Roy ===
Location	Locality	Coordinates (links to map & photo sources)	OS grid reference
Royal British Legion Village	Kent	51.28°N 00.46°E	TQ7257
Royal Leamington Spa	Warwickshire	52.28°N 01.54°W	SP3165
Royal Oak	Durham	54.60°N 01.69°W	NZ2023
Royal Oak	North Yorkshire	54.18°N 00.31°W	TA1078
Royal Oak	Sefton	53.52°N 02.89°W	SD4103
Royal's Green	Cheshire	52.97°N 02.56°W	SJ6242
Royal Tunbridge Wells	Kent	51.12°N 00.25°E	TQ5839
Royal Wootton Bassett	Wiltshire	51.53°N 01.91°W	SU0682
Roybridge	Highland	56.88°N 04.84°W	NN2781
Royd	Barnsley	53.52°N 01.68°W	SE2103
Roydhouse	Kirklees	53.60°N 01.68°W	SE2112
Royd Moor	Barnsley	53.53°N 01.66°W	SE2204
Royd Moor	Wakefield	53.61°N 01.33°W	SE4413
Roydon	Essex	51.77°N 00.02°E	TL4010
Roydon (South Norfolk)	Norfolk	52.37°N 01.06°E	TM0980
Roydon (King's Lynn and West Norfolk)	Norfolk	52.76°N 00.51°E	TF7022
Roydon Hamlet	Essex	51.74°N 00.04°E	TL4107
Royds Green	Leeds	53.72°N 01.47°W	SE3526
Royston	Barnsley	53.59°N 01.47°W	SE3511
Royston	City of Glasgow	55.86°N 04.23°W	NS6066
Royston	Hertfordshire	52.05°N 00.03°W	TL3541
Royston Water	Somerset	50.91°N 03.11°W	ST2213
Royton	Oldham	53.55°N 02.13°W	SD9107

== Ru ==
Location	Locality	Coordinates (links to map & photo sources)	OS grid reference
Ruabon	Wrexham	52.98°N 03.04°W	SJ3043
Ruaig	Argyll and Bute	56.52°N 06.78°W	NM0647
Ruan High Lanes	Cornwall	50.21°N 04.94°W	SW9039
Ruan Lanihorne	Cornwall	50.23°N 04.96°W	SW8941
Ruan Major	Cornwall	49.99°N 05.21°W	SW7016
Ruan Minor	Cornwall	49.99°N 05.18°W	SW7215
Ruardean	Gloucestershire	51.85°N 02.56°W	SO6117
Ruardean Hill	Gloucestershire	51.85°N 02.53°W	SO6317
Ruardean Woodside	Gloucestershire	51.84°N 02.55°W	SO6216
Rubery	Worcestershire	52.39°N 02.01°W	SO9977
Rubha a Mhail	Argyll and Bute	55.94°N 06.02°W	NR487796
Rubha an Ridire	Highland	56.50°N 05.67°W	NM738404
Rubha Ardvule	Western Isles	57.24°N 07.45°W	NF714300
Rubh' a Bhacain	Argyll and Bute	56.11°N 05.69°W	NR703969
Rubha Coigeach	Highland	58.09°N 05.42°W	NB980173
Rubha Fiola	Argyll and Bute	56.22°N 05.69°W	NM711101
Rubha Ghaisinis	Western Isles	57.37°N 07.29°W	NF8244
Rubh Aird Luing	Argyll and Bute	56.18°N 05.63°W	NM745049
Rubha Mor (Coll)	Argyll and Bute	56.68°N 06.48°W	NM252638
Rubha Mor (Islay)	Argyll and Bute	55.64°N 06.29°W	NR297475
Rubha Mòr	Highland	58.07°N 05.42°W	NB985146
Rubha na Faing	Argyll and Bute	55.69°N 06.51°W	NR162535
Rubha nam Meirleach	Highland	56.93°N 06.31°W	NM375911
Rubha nan Crann	Argyll and Bute	55.97°N 05.83°W	NR609824
Rubha nan Leacon	Argyll and Bute	55.58°N 06.27°W	NR308404
Rubha na Traille	Argyll and Bute	55.80°N 05.96°W	NR514638
Rubh' an t-Sailein	Argyll and Bute	55.98°N 05.99°W	NR507835
Rubh' Ardalanish	Argyll and Bute	56.26°N 06.26°W	NM358162
Rubha Robhanais	Western Isles	58.51°N 06.26°W	NB516660
Rubha Shamhnan Insir	Highland	57.05°N 06.33°W	NG375040
Ruchazie	City of Glasgow	55.86°N 04.15°W	NS6566
Ruchill	City of Glasgow	55.88°N 04.28°W	NS5768
Ruckcroft	Cumbria	54.78°N 02.73°W	NY5344
Ruckhall	Herefordshire	52.04°N 02.81°W	SO4439
Ruckinge	Kent	51.06°N 00.88°E	TR0233
Ruckland	Lincolnshire	53.28°N 00.01°W	TF3378
Rucklers Lane	Hertfordshire	51.72°N 00.46°W	TL0604
Ruckley	Shropshire	52.59°N 02.69°W	SJ5300
Rudbaxton	Pembrokeshire	51.84°N 04.96°W	SM9620
Rudby	North Yorkshire	54.44°N 01.27°W	NZ4706
Ruddington	Nottinghamshire	52.89°N 01.15°W	SK5733
Ruddle	Gloucestershire	51.79°N 02.46°W	SO6811
Rudford	Gloucestershire	51.88°N 02.33°W	SO7721
Rudge	Shropshire	52.57°N 02.28°W	SO8197
Rudge	Somerset	51.25°N 02.25°W	ST8251
Rudge Heath	Shropshire	52.55°N 02.31°W	SO7995
Rudgeway	South Gloucestershire	51.57°N 02.54°W	ST6286
Rudgwick	West Sussex	51.08°N 00.45°W	TQ0833
Rudhall	Herefordshire	51.92°N 02.55°W	SO6225
Rudheath	Cheshire	53.25°N 02.49°W	SJ6773
Rudheath Woods	Cheshire	53.22°N 02.39°W	SJ7470
Rudley Green	Essex	51.69°N 00.64°E	TL8303
Rudloe	Wiltshire	51.42°N 02.23°W	ST8470
Rudry	Caerphilly	51.56°N 03.17°W	ST1986
Rudston	East Riding of Yorkshire	54.08°N 00.33°W	TA0967
Rudyard	Staffordshire	53.11°N 02.09°W	SJ9458
Rue Point	Isle of Man	54.39°N 04.46°W	NX402028
Ruewood	Shropshire	52.83°N 02.75°W	SJ4927
Rufford	Lancashire	53.62°N 02.83°W	SD4515
Rufforth	York	53.95°N 01.20°W	SE5251
Ruffs	Nottinghamshire	53.02°N 01.22°W	SK5248
Rugby	Warwickshire	52.37°N 01.26°W	SP5075
Rugeley	Staffordshire	52.75°N 01.94°W	SK0418
Ruggin	Somerset	50.95°N 03.16°W	ST1818
Ruglen	South Ayrshire	55.30°N 04.69°W	NS2904
Rugley	Northumberland	55.38°N 01.74°W	NU1610
Ruigh'riabhach	Highland	57.90°N 05.33°W	NH0295
Ruilick	Highland	57.48°N 04.48°W	NH5146
Ruisaurie	Highland	57.48°N 04.50°W	NH5046
Ruisgarry	Western Isles	57.72°N 07.17°W	NF9282
Ruishton	Somerset	51.01°N 03.05°W	ST2624
Ruislip	Hillingdon	51.57°N 00.44°W	TQ0887
Ruislip Common	Hillingdon	51.58°N 00.44°W	TQ0889
Ruislip Gardens	Hillingdon	51.56°N 00.42°W	TQ0986
Ruislip Manor	Hillingdon	51.56°N 00.41°W	TQ1086
Ruiton	Dudley	52.52°N 02.13°W	SO9192
Ruloe	Cheshire	53.24°N 02.63°W	SJ5872
Rumbling Bridge	Clackmannan	56.17°N 03.59°W	NT0199
Rumblings	Shetland Islands	60.85°N 00.89°W	HP603193
Rumbow Cottages	Worcestershire	52.40°N 02.08°W	SO9479
Rumburgh	Suffolk	52.37°N 01.43°E	TM3481
Rumbush	Solihull	52.37°N 01.85°W	SP1075
Rumer Hill	Staffordshire	52.67°N 02.03°W	SJ9809
Rumford	Cornwall	50.49°N 04.97°W	SW8970
Rumford	Falkirk	55.97°N 03.71°W	NS9377
Rumney	Cardiff	51.50°N 03.13°W	ST2179
Rumsam	Devon	51.06°N 04.05°W	SS5631
Rumwell	Somerset	51.00°N 03.15°W	ST1923
Runcorn	Cheshire	53.32°N 02.72°W	SJ5281
Runcton	West Sussex	50.81°N 00.75°W	SU8802
Runcton Holme	Norfolk	52.65°N 00.37°E	TF6109
Runfold	Surrey	51.21°N 00.75°W	SU8747
Runhall	Norfolk	52.62°N 01.02°E	TG0507
Runham Vauxhall (Great Yarmouth)	Norfolk	52.61°N 01.70°E	TG5108
Runham (Mautby)	Norfolk	52.64°N 01.63°E	TG4611
Running Hill Head	Oldham	53.55°N 01.98°W	SE0106
Runnington	Somerset	50.98°N 03.26°W	ST1121
Running Waters	Durham	54.75°N 01.50°W	NZ3240
Runsell Green	Essex	51.71°N 00.59°E	TL7905
Runshaw Moor	Lancashire	53.66°N 02.71°W	SD5319
Runswick Bay	North Yorkshire	54.53°N 00.76°W	NZ8016
Runwell	Essex	51.61°N 00.51°E	TQ7494
Ruscombe	Berkshire	51.47°N 00.86°W	SU7976
Ruscombe	Gloucestershire	51.76°N 02.24°W	SO8307
Ruscote	Oxfordshire	52.06°N 01.35°W	SP4441
Rushall	Herefordshire	52.00°N 02.52°W	SO6434
Rushall	Norfolk	52.39°N 01.21°E	TM1982
Rushall	Walsall	52.60°N 01.95°W	SK0301
Rushall	Wiltshire	51.29°N 01.82°W	SU1255
Rushbrooke	Suffolk	52.21°N 00.76°E	TL8961
Rushbury	Shropshire	52.51°N 02.72°W	SO5191
Rushcombe Bottom	Dorset	50.77°N 02.01°W	SY9997
Rushden	Hertfordshire	51.96°N 00.10°W	TL3031
Rushden	Northamptonshire	52.28°N 00.60°W	SP9566
Rushenden	Kent	51.40°N 00.73°E	TQ9071
Rusher's Cross	East Sussex	51.02°N 00.28°E	TQ6028
Rushey Mead	City of Leicester	52.65°N 01.11°W	SK6007
Rushford	Devon	50.56°N 04.20°W	SX4476
Rushford	Norfolk	52.39°N 00.82°E	TL9281
Rush Green	Essex	51.79°N 01.13°E	TM1615
Rush Green	Havering	51.56°N 00.16°E	TQ5087
Rush Green (North Hertfordshire)	Hertfordshire	51.89°N 00.25°W	TL2023
Rush Green (East Hertfordshire)	Hertfordshire	51.79°N 00.04°W	TL3512
Rush Green	Norfolk	52.61°N 01.05°E	TG0706
Rushgreen	Cheshire	53.37°N 02.46°W	SJ6987
Rush Hill	Bath and North East Somerset	51.35°N 02.38°W	ST7362
Rushington	Hampshire	50.90°N 01.50°W	SU3512
Rushlake Green	East Sussex	50.93°N 00.30°E	TQ6218
Rushley Green	Essex	51.99°N 00.59°E	TL7836
Rushley Island	Essex	51.56°N 00.83°E	TQ964889
Rushmere	Bedfordshire	51.93°N 00.67°W	SP9127
Rushmere	Hampshire	50.92°N 01.07°W	SU6514
Rushmere	Suffolk	52.42°N 01.66°E	TM4987
Rushmere St Andrew	Suffolk	52.06°N 01.19°E	TM1945
Rushmere Street	Suffolk	52.06°N 01.20°E	TM2046
Rushmoor	Shropshire	52.71°N 02.57°W	SJ6113
Rushmoor	Surrey	51.15°N 00.75°W	SU8740
Rushmore Hill	Bromley	51.32°N 00.10°E	TQ4761
Rushock	Herefordshire	52.21°N 03.02°W	SO3058
Rushock	Worcestershire	52.33°N 02.17°W	SO8871
Rusholme	Manchester	53.45°N 02.21°W	SJ8695
Rushton	Cheshire	53.17°N 02.62°W	SJ5864
Rushton	Dorset	50.67°N 02.18°W	SY8786
Rushton	Northamptonshire	52.42°N 00.76°W	SP8482
Rushton	Shropshire	52.66°N 02.59°W	SJ6008
Rushton Spencer	Staffordshire	53.15°N 02.09°W	SJ9462
Rushwick	Worcestershire	52.17°N 02.27°W	SO8153
Rushyford	Durham	54.64°N 01.56°W	NZ2828
Rushy Green	East Sussex	50.88°N 00.06°E	TQ4512
Rusk Holm	Orkney Islands	59.20°N 02.85°W	HY511360
Ruskie	Stirling	56.17°N 04.22°W	NN6200
Ruskington	Lincolnshire	53.03°N 00.39°W	TF0850
Rusland	Cumbria	54.29°N 03.03°W	SD3389
Rusland Cross	Cumbria	54.28°N 03.01°W	SD3488
Rusper	West Sussex	51.11°N 00.28°W	TQ2037
Ruspidge	Gloucestershire	51.80°N 02.50°W	SO6512
Russell Hill	Croydon	51.33°N 00.13°W	TQ3061
Russell's Green	East Sussex	50.87°N 00.41°E	TQ7011
Russell's Hall	Dudley	52.49°N 02.11°W	SO9289
Russell's Water	Oxfordshire	51.59°N 00.99°W	SU7089
Russel's Green	Suffolk	52.30°N 01.29°E	TM2572
Russ Hill	Surrey	51.14°N 00.24°W	TQ2340
Russland	Orkney Islands	59.03°N 03.22°W	HY3017
Rusthall	Kent	51.12°N 00.22°E	TQ5639
Rustington	West Sussex	50.80°N 00.51°W	TQ0502
Rustling End	Hertfordshire	51.87°N 00.25°W	TL2021
Ruston	North Yorkshire	54.23°N 00.53°W	SE958831
Ruston Parva	East Riding of Yorkshire	54.03°N 00.38°W	TA0661
Ruswarp	North Yorkshire	54.46°N 00.64°W	NZ8809
Ruthall	Shropshire	52.49°N 02.60°W	SO5989
Rutherglen	City of Glasgow	55.83°N 04.26°W	NS5862
Ruthernbridge	Cornwall	50.46°N 04.80°W	SX0166
Ruthin	Denbighshire	53.11°N 03.31°W	SJ1258
Ruthin	The Vale Of Glamorgan	51.50°N 03.48°W	SS9779
Ruthrieston	City of Aberdeen	57.12°N 02.13°W	NJ9204
Ruthven	Aberdeenshire	57.50°N 02.83°W	NJ5046
Ruthven	Angus	56.61°N 03.17°W	NO2848
Ruthven	Highland	57.37°N 03.98°W	NH8133
Ruthvoes	Cornwall	50.40°N 04.92°W	SW9260
Ruthwaite	Cumbria	54.71°N 03.19°W	NY2336
Ruthwell	Dumfries and Galloway	54.98°N 03.42°W	NY0967
Ruxley	Bromley	51.4131°N 0.1364°E	TQ485704
Ruxton	Herefordshire	51.960°N 02.653°W	SO551291
Ruxton Green	Herefordshire	51.86°N 02.66°W	SO5419
Ruyton-XI-Towns	Shropshire	52.79°N 02.90°W	SJ3922

== Ry ==
Location	Locality	Coordinates (links to map & photo sources)	OS grid reference
Ryal	Northumberland	55.06°N 01.98°W	NZ0174
Ryall	Dorset	50.74°N 02.85°W	SY4094
Ryall	Worcestershire	52.05°N 02.20°W	SO8640
Ryarsh	Kent	51.30°N 00.39°E	TQ6759
Rychraggan	Highland	57.33°N 04.56°W	NH4630
Rydal	Cumbria	54.44°N 02.98°W	NY3606
Ryde	Isle of Wight	50.72°N 01.16°W	SZ5992
Rydens	Surrey	51.37°N 00.40°W	TQ1165
Rydeshill	Surrey	51.25°N 00.61°W	SU9751
Rydon	Devon	50.54°N 03.59°W	SX8773
Rye	East Sussex	50.94°N 00.71°E	TQ9120
Ryebank	Shropshire	52.87°N 02.72°W	SJ5131
Rye Common	Hampshire	51.24°N 00.89°W	SU7750
Ryecroft	Bradford	53.83°N 01.89°W	SE0738
Ryecroft	Rotherham	53.45°N 01.33°W	SK4496
Ryecroft Gate	Staffordshire	53.14°N 02.10°W	SJ9361
Rye Cross	Worcestershire	52.01°N 02.19°W	SO7735
Ryeford	Gloucestershire	51.73°N 02.27°W	SO8104
Rye Foreign	East Sussex	50.96°N 00.70°E	TQ9022
Rye Harbour	East Sussex	50.93°N 00.74°E	TQ9319
Ryehill	Aberdeenshire	57.31°N 02.56°W	NJ6625
Ryehill	East Riding of Yorkshire	53.70°N 00.15°W	TA2225
Ryeish Green	Berkshire	51.39°N 00.96°W	SU7267
Ryelands	Herefordshire	52.21°N 02.76°W	SO4858
Rye Park	Hertfordshire	51.76°N 00.01°W	TL3709
Rye Street	Worcestershire	52.01°N 02.32°W	SO7835
Ryeworth	Gloucestershire	51.88°N 02.05°W	SO9621
Ryhall	Rutland	52.67°N 00.47°W	TF0310
Ryhill	Wakefield	53.62°N 01.42°W	SE3814
Ryhope	Sunderland	54.86°N 01.37°W	NZ4052
Ryhope Colliery	Sunderland	54.87°N 01.37°W	NZ4053
Rylah	Derbyshire	53.19°N 01.31°W	SK4667
Rylands	Cornwall	50.56°N 04.687°W	SX0976
Rylands	Nottinghamshire	52.915°N 01.205°W	SK5335
Rylstone	North Yorkshire	54.01°N 02.06°W	SD9658
Ryme Intrinseca	Dorset	50.88°N 02.59°W	ST5810
Rysa Little	Orkney Islands	58.86°N 03.20°W	ND308981
Ryther	North Yorkshire	53.84°N 01.16°W	SE5539
Ryton	Gateshead	54.97°N 01.76°W	NZ1564
Ryton	Gloucestershire	51.97°N 02.40°W	SO7231
Ryton	North Yorkshire	54.16°N 00.79°W	SE7975
Ryton	Shropshire	52.61°N 02.35°W	SJ7602
Ryton	Warwickshire	52.47°N 01.42°W	SP3986
Ryton-on-Dunsmore	Warwickshire	52.36°N 01.44°W	SP3874
Ryton Woodside	Gateshead	54.95°N 01.78°W	NZ1462
