= Rush Green =

Rush Green may refer to:

- Rush Green, London
- Rush Green, Essex
- Rush Green, East Hertfordshire
- Rush Green, North Hertfordshire
- Rush Green, Norfolk, a United Kingdom location
- Rushgreen, a United Kingdom location in Cheshire

== See also ==
- Rushey Green (disambiguation)
