= Low House =

Low House may refer to:

in the United Kingdom

- Low House, Wetheral, in Cumbria, England

in the United States (by state)

- Low House (Norfolk, Connecticut), listed on the NRHP in Litchfield County, Connecticut
- Juliette Gordon Low Historic District, Savannah, Georgia, a National Historic Landmark which includes the Andrew Low House
- Morris Low Bungalow, Paris, Idaho, listed on the NRHP in Bear Lake County, Idaho
- Joseph W. Low House, Bangor, Maine, listed on the NRHP in Penobscot County, Maine
- Thomas Low House, Ipswich, Massachusetts, listed on the NRHP in Essex County, Massachusetts
- Effingham Low House, Pinebrook, New Jersey, listed on the NRHP in Morris County, New Jersey
- Cornelius Low House, Piscataway, New Jersey, NRHP-listed as "Ivy Hall"
- Low House (Whitsett, North Carolina), listed on the NRHP in Guilford County, North Carolina
- William G. Low House, Bristol, Rhode Island, demolished 1962
- Reichardt-Low House, Brenham, Texas, listed on the NRHP in Washington County, Texas

== See also ==
- Lowe House (disambiguation)
