= Listed buildings in Ainstable =

Ainstable is a civil parish in Westmorland and Furness, Cumbria, England. It contains 21 buildings that are recorded in the National Heritage List for England. Of these, one is listed at Grade I, the highest of the three grades, two are at Grade II*, the middle grade, and the others are at Grade II, the lowest grade. The parish contains the villages of Ainstable, Croglin and Newbiggin, the hamlets of Dale, Walmersyke, Ruckcroft and Longdales, part of the village of Armathwaite, and the surrounding countryside. The oldest listed building in the parish originated as a Benedictine Nunnery, and has been altered and since used for other purposes. The other listed buildings consist of houses, farmhouses and associated structures, a bridge, a war memorial, a lych gate, and two churches.

== Key ==
| Grade | Criteria |
|---|---|
| I | Buildings of exceptional interest, sometimes considered to be internationally important |
| II* | Particularly important buildings of more than special interest |
| II | Buildings of national importance and special interest |

== Buildings ==
| Name and location | Photograph | Date | Notes | Grade |
|---|---|---|---|---|
| The Nunnery; 54.77843°N 2.72092°W | | Mid 13th century | Originally a Benedictine Nunnery, it was later altered, extended, and used for other purposes. The building is in sandstone with a green slate roof, and has 2 1/2 storeys and nine bays. It has a plinth, quoins, a string course, and a moulded cornice. The central three bays project forward, and have a moulded parapet. The round-headed doorway has a pilastered surround, a radial fanlight with a false keystone, a moulded entablature, and a frieze with metopes and triglyphs. The windows are sashes in moulded architraves. | I |
| The Old Pele, Rectory Farmhouse and barn 54.81856°N 2.66232°W | | Early 15th century (probable) | This was originally a fortified rectory, with a tower house, a hall added in about 1500, and later alterations and extensions. It is in sandstone with roofs of Welsh and green slate. The tower has two storeys, one bay and thick walls. The hall has two storeys and three bays, and contains sash windows and a sundial. To the right are a farmhouse and a barn that have been integrated into the original building. | II* |
| Byre west of Townhead, Newbiggin; 54.83464°N 2.68213°W | — | Mid 16th century (probable) | Originally a bastle house, later used as a farm building, it has thick sandstone walls, large quoins, and a Welsh slate roof. There are two storeys, two bays, and two entrances, one in each floor, the upper entrance having a chamfered surround and an inscribed lintel. The windows have been blocked, and inside the building are two fireplaces. | II* |
| Dale Farmhouse and barn 54.78974°N 2.70935°W | — | Early 17th century (probable) | This originated as a public house and a farmhouse. It is in sandstone with quoins, and has a green slate roof with coped gables. There are two storeys, three bays, and a door with a quoined surround and a reeded lintel. In the ground floor are triple casement windows with mullions, and in the upper floor are sash windows with reeded surrounds. To the right is a single-storey sandstone outbuilding with slit vents and plank doors, and to the left is a small two-storey single-bay granary in sandstone with a Welsh slate roof. | II |
| Bascodyke; 54.79957°N 2.73321°W | — | Late 17th century (probable) | A farmhouse that was altered in 1747, it is rendered with quoins, a cornice, and a slate roof with coped gables. There are two storeys and four bays. The doorway has a fanlight with a pilastered surround, a triglyph entablature, and a dentilled segmental pediment. To the right of the doorway is a three-light mullioned window with casements. The other windows are casements or sashes with moulded stone surrounds. | II |
| The Dale; 54.79009°N 2.70917°W | — | Late 17th century (probable) | A farmhouse that was altered in 1752. It is in sandstone, and has a green slate roof with coped gables. There are two storeys and two bays. On the front is an open latticed iron porch with a shaped canopy. The windows are sashes, and in the ground floor they have two lights and mullions. | II |
| Townhead, Newbiggin; 54.83447°N 2.68254°W | — | 1702 | A farmhouse that was extended to the rear in the 19th century. It is rendered with a green slate roof. There are two storeys and four bays. The doorway has a chamfered surround, an inscribed and dated entablature, and a hood mould. The windows are sashes with plain surrounds. | II |
| Bramery; 54.79957°N 2.73321°W | — | Early 18th century | A farmhouse that was extended at right angles in the late 19th century, giving a T-shaped plan. It is in sandstone with a Welsh slate roof, and has two storeys. The original part has four bays, and a blocked entrance with a moulded architrave. The windows are mullioned with casements. The extension has a doorway with a moulded architrave, a pulvinated frieze, and a moulded cornice; the windows are sashes. | II |
| Cross south of Cross House; 54.78222°N 2.72438°W | — | Early 18th century | A sanctuary cross for a nunnery in sandstone. It consists of a re-cutting of an earlier cross that is set on a plinth, and contains a carved cross and an inscription. | II |
| Fair Hill House and barn 54.81769°N 2.66445°W | — | 1729 | A sandstone farmhouse with quoins and a sandstone slate roof. There are two storeys and four bays. The doorway has a moulded architrave, an inscribed entablature, and a moulded cornice. To the right is a small fire window, and the other windows are sashes. To the left of the farmhouse is a 19th-century sandstone barn with two storeys and numerous bays. (Note: Street View in March 2010 shows that the barn is in ruins.) | II |
| Armathwaite Bridge; 54.80674°N 2.76814°W | | 18th century | The bridge carries a road over the River Eden, and was rebuilt in 1907–08. It is in sandstone, and consists of three round arches with two splayed cutwaters. On the parapet is an inscribed stone. | II |
| Armathwaite Hall; 54.80612°N 2.76716°W | — | Early 19th century | A country house in sandstone with a hipped slate roof. There are two storeys and six bays. The entrance front has a single storey extension off-centre, and the outer bays form two-storey projecting wings. On this front is a doorway and a stair window, and on the north front are two two-storey bay windows. The windows are sashes. | II |
| Low Fold; 54.78888°N 2.72675°W | — | Early 19th century | A sandstone farmhouse with quoins and a slate roof. There are two storeys and three bays. The doorway has a plain surround, a fanlight, and a moulded cornice, and the windows are sashes with raised plain stone surrounds. | II |
| Stable block, The Nunnery; 54.77869°N 2.72098°W | — | Early 19th century | The stable block is in sandstone with quoins, and it has a hipped green slate roof. The building has a single storey and numerous bays, and it surrounds a courtyard on four sides. There is a large elliptical-arched entrance that has a panel with a carved coat of arms. There are casement windows with trefoil heads, transoms, impost blocks and keystones, and there are round vents with raised stone surrounds. | II |
| Summer house 54.77429°N 2.72138°W | — | Early 19th century | The summer house is in the grounds of The Nunnery, and it incorporates features from the 15th century. The building is in sandstone with carved panels, and has a timber roof with an asphalt covering. It has an open front, and inside are wooden seats and eight panels of coats of arms, some of which were moved from a different site. | II |
| Ainstable Hall; 54.81128°N 2.73996°W | — | 1840s (probable) | A sandstone farmhouse with quoins and modillions that has a Welsh slate roof with coped gables. There are two storeys, three bays, and a central gabled porch with a side entrance. The windows are mullioned with chamfered surrounds. | II |
| Townhead, Ainstable; 54.81853°N 2.73930°W | — | 19th century | A stone farmhouse on a plinth, with quoins and a slate roof. The main block has two storeys and a symmetrical front of three bays. The central doorway has a patterned fanlight in a pilaster surround, a moulded cornice, and a triangular moulded pediment. The windows are sashes in raised stone surrounds. To the right is a lower two-storey bay linking to a wing at right angles, and to the left is a wall that has a doorway with alternate block surround and a keyed entablature. | II |
| St Michael's Church; 54.81317°N 2.73286°W | | 1870–71 | The church, designed by George Watson, is on the site of a medieval church. It is in sandstone, and has a slate roof with decorative ridge tiles, coped gables, and a cross finial. The church consists of a nave, a south transept, and a chancel. Most of the windows are lancets, and there is a circular window in the transept. Inside the church is a Norman pillar piscina. | II |
| St John's Church; 54.81851°N 2.66371°W | | 1878 | The church, designed by J. Howison in Norman style, is on the site of a medieval church. It is in sandstone on a chamfered plinth, and has a green slate roof with coped gables and cross finials. The church consists of a nave with a south porch, and a chancel with a north vestry. The entrance, windows and chancel arch have zigzag decoration. On the west gable is a bellcote, and in the west wall is a clock with a date and an inscription. | II |
| Croglin War Memorial; 54.81841°N 2.66378°W | — | 1921 | The war memorial is in the churchyard of St John's Church. It is in sandstone, and consists of a Celtic cross with a tapered shaft on a base of roughly hewn stone. The shaft is decorated with carved Celtic knot motifs. A tablet in front of the base carries an inscription and the names of those lost in the First World War, and a separate tablet records the name of one man lost in the Second World War. | II |
| War memorial lych-gate 54.81291°N 2.73279°W | — | 1934 | The lych gate is at the entrance to the churchyard of St Michael's Church, and was designed as a war memorial. The walls are in red sandstone from Lazonby Fell, on which is an oak timber frame and a hipped slate roof. The entrance has a Tudor arch, and to the right is a low wall ending in a post with a pyramidal stone finial. Inside, is a tablet in Borrowdale slate with an inscription and the names of those lost in the First World War. | II |

== Notes and references ==
=== Sources ===
- Historic England, "The Nunnery, Ainstable (1312417)", National Heritage List for England
- Historic England, "The Old Pele and Rectory Farmhouse and Barn, Ainstable (1327028)", National Heritage List for England
- Historic England, "Byre west of Townhead, Ainstable (1137235)", National Heritage List for England
- Historic England, "Dale Farmhouse and adjoining barn, Ainstable (1144840)", National Heritage List for England
- Historic England, "Bascodyke, Ainstable (1144843)", National Heritage List for England
- Historic England, "The Dale, Ainstable (1327029)", National Heritage List for England
- Historic England, "Townhead, Ainstable (1327030)", National Heritage List for England
- Historic England, "Bramery, Ainstable (1312389)", National Heritage List for England
- Historic England, "Cross south of Cross House, Ainstable (1137249)", National Heritage List for England
- Historic England, "Fair Hill House, and adjoining barnl, Ainstable (1144839)", National Heritage List for England
- Historic England, "Armathwaite Bridge, Ainstable (1327027)", National Heritage List for England
- Historic England, "Armathwaite Hall, Ainstable (1144837)", National Heritage List for England
- Historic England, "Low Fold, Ainstable (1144841)", National Heritage List for England
- Historic England, "Stable block to north-west of The Nunnery, Ainstable (1144842)", National Heritage List for England
- Historic England, "Summer House south of The Nunnery, Ainstable (1327031)", National Heritage List for England
- Historic England, "Ainstable Hall, Ainstable (1144835)", National Heritage List for England
- Historic England, "Townhead, Ainstable (1144836)", National Heritage List for England
- Historic England, "Church of St Michael, Ainstable (1144834)", National Heritage List for England
- Historic England, "Church of St John the Baptist, Ainstable (1144838)", National Heritage List for England
- Historic England, "Croglin War Memorial, Ainstable (1461621)", National Heritage List for England
- Historic England, "Ainstable War Memorial Lych-Gate, Ainstable (1462530)", National Heritage List for England
- Historic England, Listed Buildings
- Hyde, Matthew; Pevsner, Nikolaus (2010) [1967], Cumbria, The Buildings of England, New Haven and London: Yale University Press, ISBN 978-0-300-12663-1
