= Armathwaite Nunnery =

Coordinates: 54.778725°N 2.721439°W

- Interactive map of Armathwaite Nunnery

Monastery information
- Other names: Nunnery of Ainstable, Armathwaite Priory
- Order: Benedictine
- Established: Ca. 1092. Disputed. Certainly before 1200.
- Disestablished: 1537
- Diocese: Carlisle

People
- Founder: William Rufus. Disputed

Site
- Location: Armathwaite, Cumbria, England
- Public access: No

Armathwaite Nunnery was a Benedictine nunnery in Cumbria, England. It was situated near the confluence of the rivers Croglin Water and Eden in the southern angle of the parish of Ainstable, and was first known as the nunnery of Ainstable.

== Foundation ==
The nunnery was said by a charter to have been founded by William Rufus on 6 January 1089 for black nuns of the Order of St. Benedict in the honour of Jesus Christ and the Blessed Virgin Mary. Still, this charter is not regarded as original due to its various anachronisms and extravagant claims. By this so-called charter William Rufus was supposed to give the nuns the 2 acres of land upon which the house was built, 10 acres of meadow by the nunnery, and 216 acres in the forest of Inglewood. Also said to be granted was Common of pasture throughout the forest, sufficient wood for their buildings, and freedom from toll throughout the whole of England. It was also claimed that Rufus had granted to the nuns, within their nunnery and lands adjoining, all the liberties which he had conceded to the monastery of Westminster without molestation of any of the king's sheriffs, escheators, bailiffs or lieges.

A claim to the liberty of sanctuary was also made, which was probably related to a square pillar, inscribed with a cross and the words 'Sanctuarium 1088,' which was placed on rising ground above the nunnery. The reason for the forgery appears to have been to regain losses following devastating raids from the Scots, as recorded in letters patent of Edward IV, 1473. Seven years later, in 1480, Isabel the prioress and the nuns, having no surviving charters and title-deeds, presented their compilation charter, which they ascribed to William Rufus, and had it inspected and confirmed. It seems likely this was the only way to ensure the nunnery's survival, but in doing so the compilation was subject to the unreliability of memory and oral tradition, and was not historically accurate. However, the nunnery was certainly founded before 1200.

== Later life ==
Of authentic references to the nunnery, the earliest is from about 1200 in a charter of Roger de Beauchamp to the priory of St. Bees. It stated that the land he gave to that monastery was near the land of the nuns of 'Ainstapillith' in 'Leseschalis' or Seascale on the western coast. Another reliable record tells us that the nuns had the liberty of free election of a prioress, and that with the bishop, to whom she made obedience, rested the confirmation and institution of the person elected.

The difficulties of surviving in an area so close to the raiders of the borders is shown in the terrible problems recorded in 1473, earlier in 1318 they were not taxed as they were totally destroyed by the Scots. Nonetheless they had local supporters. In 1356 Dame Agnes, the consort of Sir Richard de Denton, bequeathed 10s. and in 1358 John de Salkeld 40s. to the prioress and her sisters. Richard de Ulnesby, rector of Ousby, bequeathed in 1362 a cow, while in 1376 a citizen of Carlisle, William de London, and a country gentleman, Roger de Salkeld, in 1379, made them bequests of money.

The nunnery was valued in 1291 at £10 and in 1535 was valued at £19 2s. 2d, which included £6 from the rectory of the church of 'Aynstablie,' of which the prioress was patron.

The property of the nunnery at the time of the dissolution was scattered in Ainstable, Kirkoswald, Cumwhitton, Blencarn, Kirkland, Glassonby, Crofton and Carlisle. The most extensive estate they possessed in one place was 'the Nouneclose,' consisting of 216 acres.

The house seems to have been dissolved soon after 31 July 1537, when the inventory was made. There was a prioress and three nuns, and none were accused by the commissioners in their notorious “Black Book”. Anne Derwentwater received a pension of 53s. 4d. a year.

=== Prioresses of Armathwaite ===
- Isabel, died 1362
- Katherine de Lancaster, elected 1362
- Isabel, occurs 1480
- Isabel Otteley, died 1507
- Agnes or Annis Elvyngton, died 1507
- Agnes or Anne Derwentwater, occurs 1535, 1537

== Post-dissolution ==
The priory and rectory of Ainstable were leased to Leonard Barowe of Armathwaite in 1538, and the manor was afterwards sold by Edward VI. The buildings were granted to William Grayme in 1552, and then passed to the Aglionby family named on a 1694 datestone. The present house on the site was built by Henry Aglionby. It is recorded in 1840 that part of the wall of the monastic buildings was standing on the west side of the dwelling house.
