= Rose Green =

Rose Green may refer to:

- Rose Green, Assington, a hamlet in Assington, in Suffolk, England
- Rose Green, Essex, hamlet in Essex, England
- Rose Green, Lindsey, hamlet in Suffolk, England
- Rose Green, West Sussex, area of Bognor Regis, West Sussex, England
- Rose Basile Green (1914–2003), American scholar, poet, and educator

== See also ==
- Rose Greene – American activist and financial planner (1946–2019)
