= Newbiggin, Ainstable =

Hamlet in Cumbria, England

Coordinates: 54.835°N 2.690°W

Newbiggin
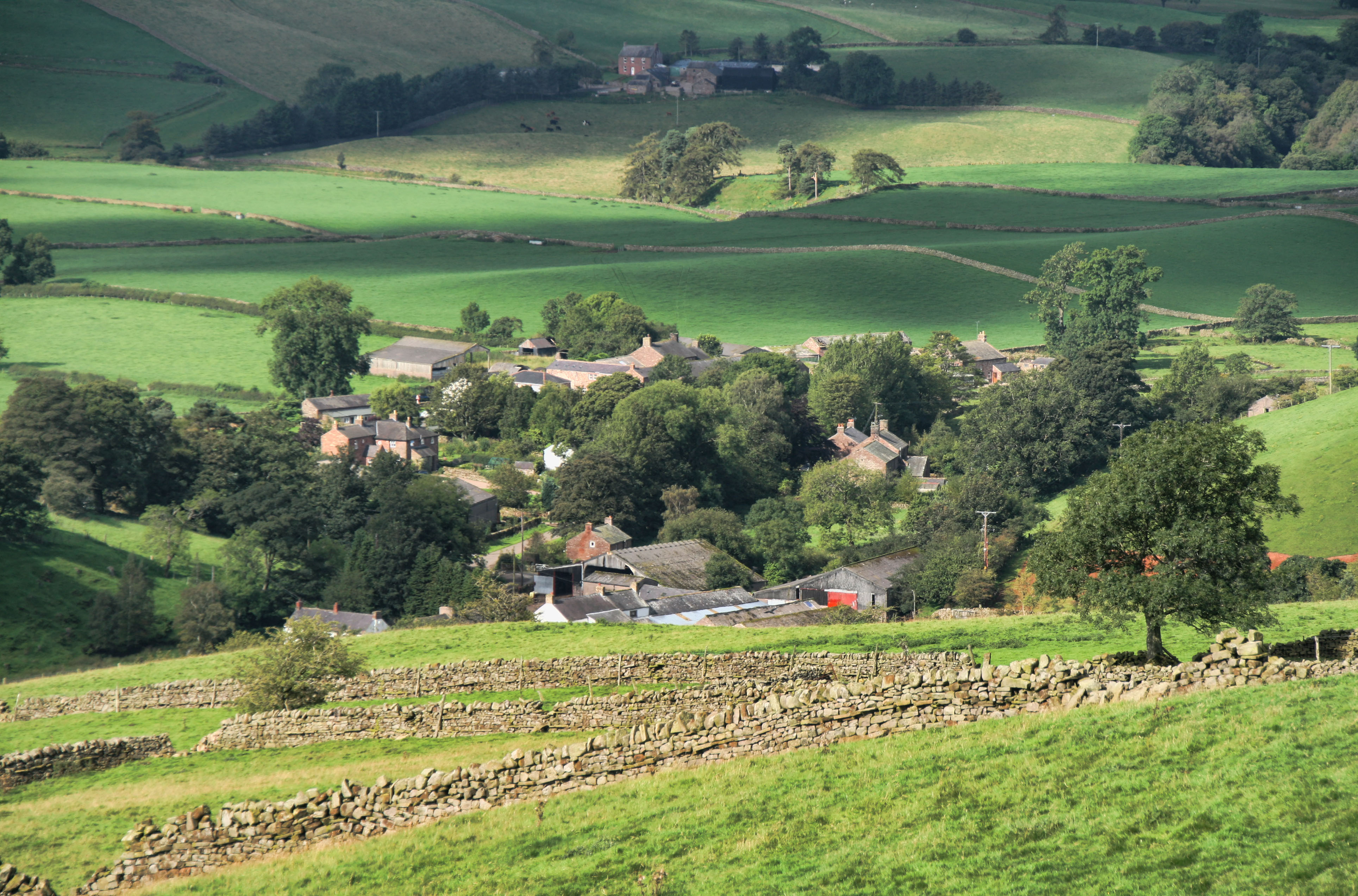
- Newbiggin

- Location in former Eden District, Cumbria Location within Cumbria
- OS grid reference: NY556491
- Civil parish: Ainstable
- Unitary authority: Westmorland and Furness
- Ceremonial county: Cumbria
- Region: North West
- Country: England
- Sovereign state: United Kingdom
- Post town: Brampton
- Postcode district: CA8
- Dialling code: 01768
- Police: Cumbria
- Fire: Cumbria
- Ambulance: North West
- UK Parliament: Penrith and Solway

Newbiggin is a small hamlet in Cumbria, England. Cumrew beck flows north-west through Newbiggin eventually joining the Eden close to Armathwaite. The village contains many houses of a traditional design, a historic chapel (now a private home) and several large-acreage farms. On the fells around the village there are traces of the old mines that used to operate in the area, as well as the skeletons of lime kilns. A track from the village leads up to new water river, which can be followed north to Castle Carrock. There is a pub, The Blue Bell Inn.

== See also ==
- Listed buildings in Ainstable
