= HMS Rockwood =

Destroyer of the Royal Navy

History

United Kingdom
- Name: HMS Rockwood
- Ordered: 28 July 1940
- Builder: Vickers-Armstrongs, Barrow-in-Furness
- Laid down: 29 August 1941
- Launched: 13 June 1942
- Commissioned: 4 November 1942
- Identification: Pennant number: L39
- Honours and awards: Sicily 1943, Aegean 1943, Atlantic 1944
- Fate: Scrapped in 1946
- Badge: On a Field Blue, issuant from rock, Black, a hurst of oaks, proper.

General characteristics
- Class & type: Hunt-class destroyer
- Displacement: 1,050 tons standard; 1,435 tons full load
- Length: 280 ft (85 m)
- Beam: 33 ft 4 in (10.16 m)
- Draught: 8 ft 3 in (2.51 m)
- Propulsion: Two x Admiralty 3 drum boilers; Two shaft Parsons geared turbines; 19,000 shp
- Speed: 27 knots (25½ knots full)
- Range: 2,350 nmi (4,350 km) at 20 knots (37 km/h)
- Complement: 168
- Armament: 4 × QF 4 in Mark XVI on twin mounts Mk. XIX; 4 × QF 2 pdr Mk. VIII on quad mount MK.VII; 2 × 20 mm Oerlikons on single mounts P Mk. III; 2 × tubes for 21 inch (533 mm) torpedoes; 110 depth charges, 4 throwers, 3 racks

HMS Rockwood was a Type III, Hunt class Escort destroyer of the Royal Navy, built by Vickers-Armstrongs in Barrow-in-Furness and served during the Second World War. She was damaged in action in November 1943 by a glide bomb, not fully repaired, took no further part in the war and was broken up for scrap in 1946.

The "Hunt" class were named after British fox and stag hunts, in this case, the Rockwood Harriers and hounds, based in Roydhouse, West Yorkshire. In January 1942 Rockwood was adopted by the civil community of Luton Rural District of Bedfordshire.

== Construction and design ==
The Hunt class was meant to fill the Royal Navy's need for a large number of small destroyer-type vessels capable of both convoy escort and operations with the fleet.

Rockwood was one of 27, Type III's and this third batch forfeited 'Y' gun turret for a pair of 21-inch torpedo tubes amidships, to increase their anti-shipping punch and the main searchlight was moved to the aft shelter deck. The Type may also be identified by a straight funnel with a sloping top and the foremast had no rake.

She was armed with four quick-firing 4-inch Mk XVI dual-purpose guns in two twin mounts, two 21 inch torpedo tubes in a single, twin mount, with a quadruple 2-pounder "pom-pom" and Oerlikon 20 mm cannons for defence against aircraft. Anti-submarine armament consisted of stern-mounted depth charge racks and four depth charge throwers with a total of 110 depth charges carried. Type 291 and Type 285 radars were fitted, as was Type 128 sonar.

== Service history ==
Rockwood completed acceptance trials, calibrations and worked-up with her crew during November 1942, then embarked on escort duty from Clyde to Durban, with Convoy WS 25. In February 1943 she was chosen for convoy defence and patrol duties in the Eastern Mediterranean, supporting the Eighth Army's advance into Cyrenaica. Between June and August, she escorted supply ships in support of Operations Corkscrew and Husky.

From September Rockwood was part of the Aegean Sea flotilla following the surrender of Italian forces. The patrol was tasked to intercept German troop movements around the Aegean Islands.

=== Loss ===
On 11 November 1943 in the company of destroyer HMS Petard and the Polish destroyer ORP Krakowia, Rockwood shelled Kalymnos harbour after Petard had spotted an enemy landing craft accompanied by two caïques crowded with troops. Whilst withdrawing from this mission, Rockwood was damaged by a Henschel Hs 293 glider bomb (which failed to explode) at position 36°25′N 26°52′E. During firefighting and basic repairs, it was discovered that the bomb had torn through thawing beef rations, creating a scene which the damage-control party initially mistook for a massacre:

Rockwood was eventually towed to Alexandria by her sister ship HMS Blencathra where she was declared a constructive loss, paid off in May 1944 and placed in reserve. She was scrapped at Gateshead by JJ King in August 1946.

== Publications ==
- Colledge, J. J.; Warlow, Ben (2006) [1969]. Ships of the Royal Navy: The Complete Record of All Fighting Ships of the Royal Navy from the 15th Century to the Present (3rd Rev ed.). London: Chatham Publishing. ISBN 978-1-86176-281-8. OCLC 67375475.
- English, John (1987). The Hunts: A history of the design, development and careers of the 86 destroyers of this class built for the Royal and Allied Navies during World War II. World Ship Society. ISBN 0-905617-44-4.
- Friedman, Norman (2008). British Destroyers and Frigates: The Second World War and After. Barnsley, UK: Seaforth Publishing. ISBN 978-1-84832-015-4.
- Gardiner, Robert; Chesneau, Roger, eds. (1980). Conway's All The World's Fighting Ships 1922–1946. London: Conway Maritime Press. ISBN 0-85177-146-7.
- Lenton, H.T. (1970). Navies of the Second World War: British Fleet & Escort Destroyers Volume Two. London: Macdonald & Co. ISBN 0-356-03122-5.
- Shores, Christopher; Massimello, Giovanni; Guest, Russell; Olynyk, Frank; Bock, Winfried (2016). A History of the Mediterranean Air War 1940–1945: Volume Three: Tunisia and the End in Africa: November 1942 – May 1943. London: Grub Street. ISBN 978-1-910690-00-0.
- Whitley, M. J. (2000). Destroyers of World War Two: An International Encyclopedia. London: Cassell & Co. ISBN 1-85409-521-8.
