= Rushey Green =

Rushey Green or Rushy Green may refer to places in England:

- Rushey Green (ward), London Borough of Lewisham
- Rushy Green, East Sussex, a location near Ringmer
- An old alternative name for Rush Common, Lambeth
