= Armathwaite Castle =

Castle in Cumbria, England

- Armathwaite, Cumbria, England
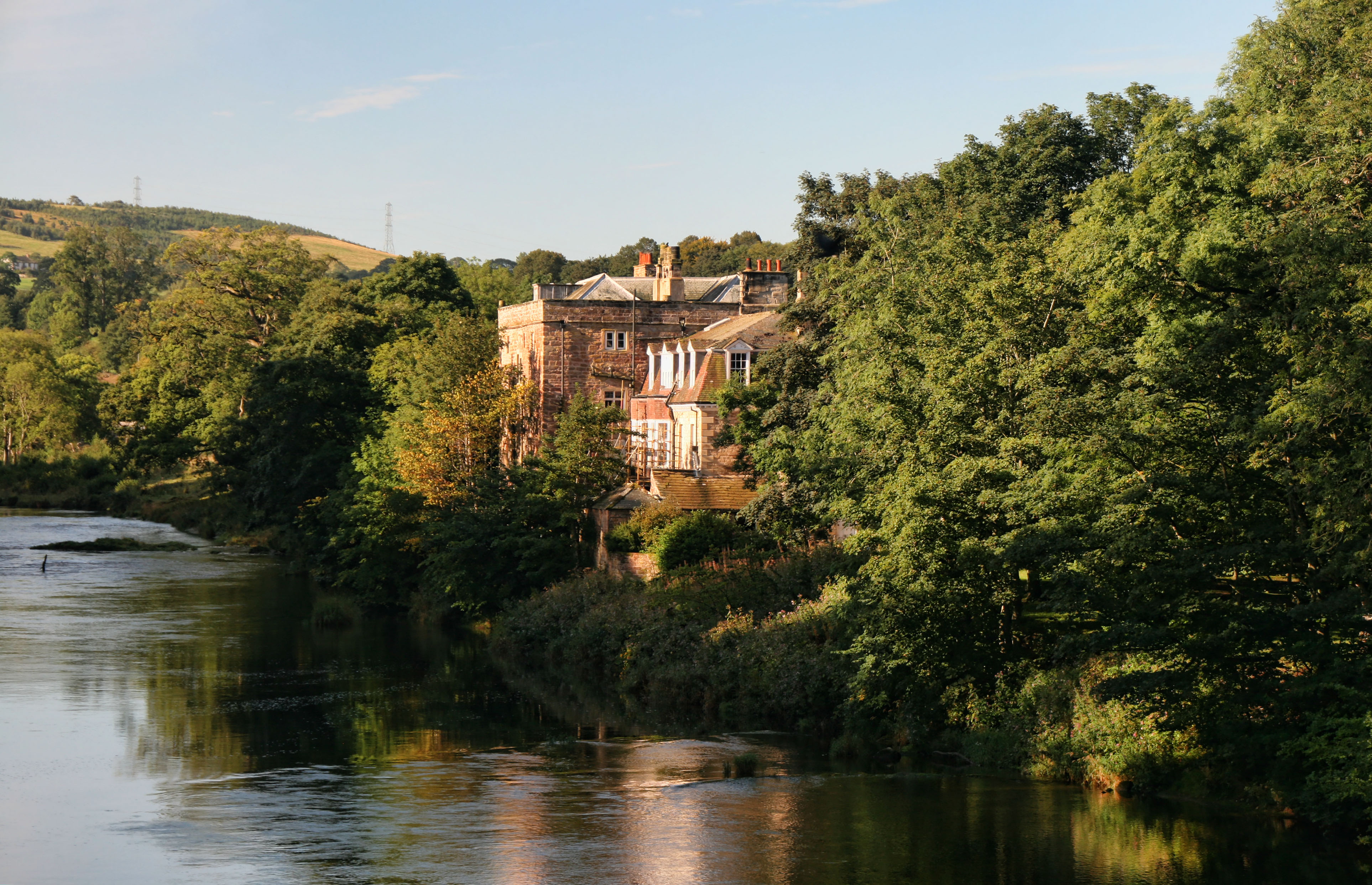
- Armathwaite Castle

Site information
- Type: Converted Pele tower
- Owner: Private

Location
- Location in Eden, Cumbria Location in Cumbria, England
- Coordinates: 54.8055°N 2.7701°W
- Grid reference: grid reference NY506459

Site history
- Materials: Stone

Armathwaite Castle is in the village of Armathwaite, Cumbria, England, by the River Eden. Originally built to defend against Scottish raiders in the 15th century, it was converted into a mansion and today is a Grade II* listed building.

== Details ==
Armathwaite Castle was built in the 15th century on a strong point along the west side of the River Eden by the Skelton family. Although the precise date of its construction cannot be ascertained it was most probably constructed by John Skelton in 1445. The Skelton family appears to have been a well known family, being the representatives of the county and the city of Carlisle at the parliament. The castle was a four-storied pele tower with the facade constructed from hewn stone and protected the Eden valley from Scottish raiders. The castle estate also includes a Benedictine nunnery called Nun's Close. The founder of this nunnery is now known, with some sources naming William Rufus, while other disagreeing and stating that he founded a religious house at the nunnery, not the nunnery itself.

The Skeltons resided at the castle till 1712, when Richard Skelton sold the castle to William Sanderson. Robert Sanderson Milbourne (1660–1741), inherited the castle from his brother in 1727. Robert was assistant to Thomas Rymer in preparing the massive 20-volume Foedera (a compilation of treaties between England and foreign states from 1066 to 1654), (Note: Hardy 1869, p. cxii, contains a brief biographical note of Robert Sanderson.) and he made the castle the centre of a collection of antiquities and relics. It passed to the Milbournes and in 1846 onto William Lowther, the 2nd Earl of Lonsdale. It was reported in 1892 that the castle had fallen into disrepair. In the early 19th century the castle was converted into a mansion, faced with ashlar cut stone in a classical style, with an adjacent wing for offices.

Today the castle is privately owned.

Fire: On 23 July 2026 the castle was severely damaged by a fire.

== See also ==
- Grade II* listed buildings in Westmorland and Furness
- Listed buildings in Hesket, Cumbria
- Castles in Great Britain and Ireland
- List of castles in England

== Bibliography ==
- Fry, Plantagenet Somerset (1980). The David and Charles Book of Castles. Newton Abbot: David & Charles. ISBN 978-0-7153-7976-9.
- Hardy, Thomas Duffus (1869). Syllabus (in English) of the documents relating to England and other kingdoms contained in the collection known as "Rymer's Foedera", Vol. 1. London: Longman & Co. and Trübner & Co. p. xcii.
- Jefferson, Samuel (1838). History and Antiquities of Carlisle. Carlise, UK: Samuel Jefferson.
- Mackenzie, James D. (1896). The Castles of England: Their Story and Structure. Vol. II. New York: Macmillan. OCLC 504892038.
- Pettifer, Adrian (2002). English Castles: A Guide by Counties. Woodbridge, UK: Boydell Press. ISBN 978-0-85115-782-5.
