= Lowe House =

Lowe House may refer to:

- Lowe-Forman House, New Orleans, Louisiana, listed on the NRHP in Orleans Parish, Louisiana
- Joshua Lowe House, Rising Sun, Maryland, listed on the NRHP in Cecil County, Maryland
- Cicero Francis Lowe House Winston-Salem, North Carolina, listed on the NRHP in Forsyth County, North Carolina
- Martin-Lowe House, Clarendon, Texas, listed on the NRHP in Donley County, Texas
- David Lowe House, Cheney, Washington, listed on the NRHP in Spokane County, Washington
- Lowe House (San Francisco), 100 32nd Avenue in San Francisco, designed by Joseph Esherick
- Church of St Mary, Lowe House, Roman Catholic Parish in St Helens, Merseyside, UK

== See also ==
- Low House (disambiguation)
