= Hertford Heath nature reserve =

Nature reserve in Hertfordshire, England

Coordinates: 51.7813°N 0.0372°W

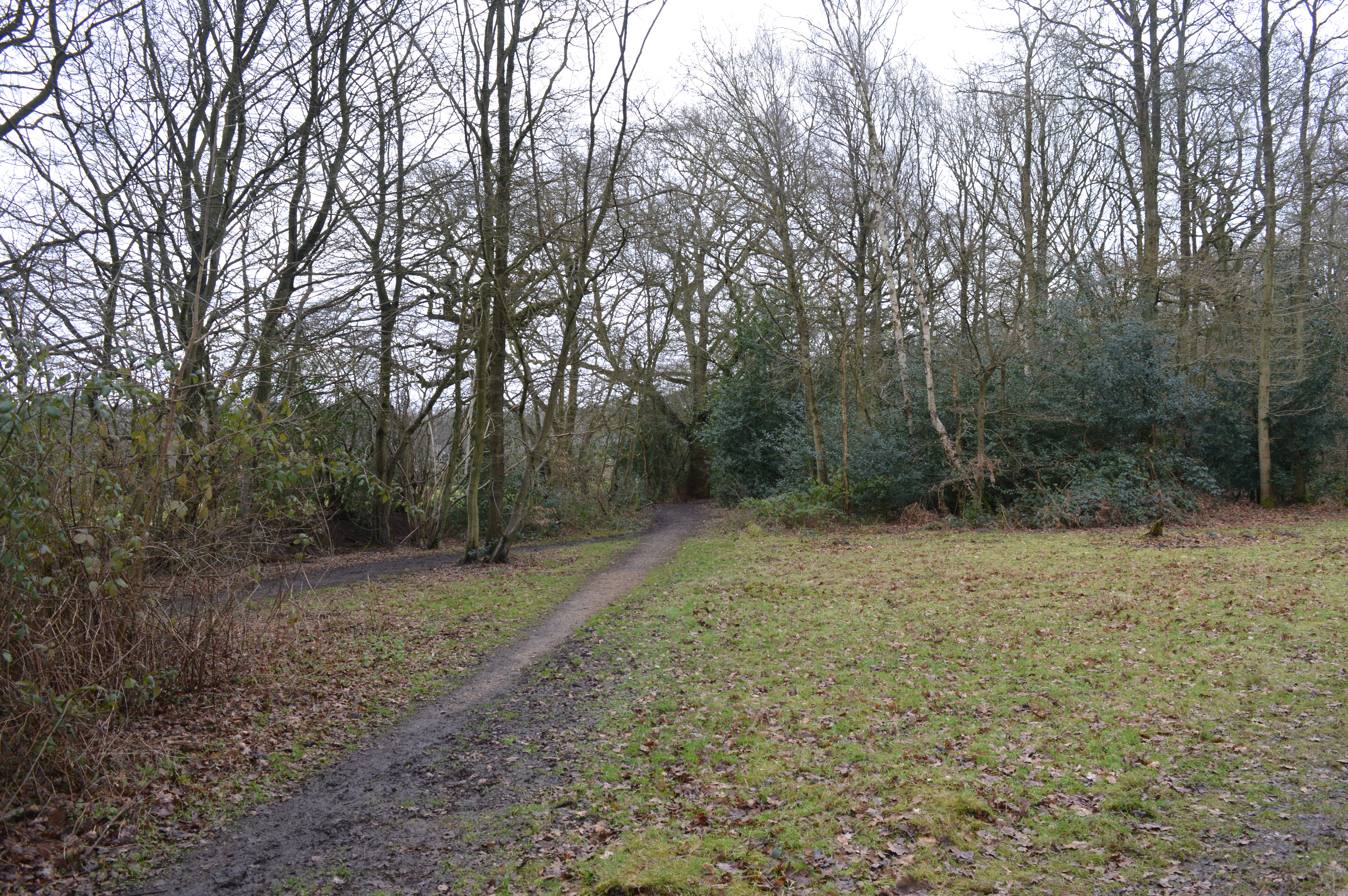
Hertford Heath north

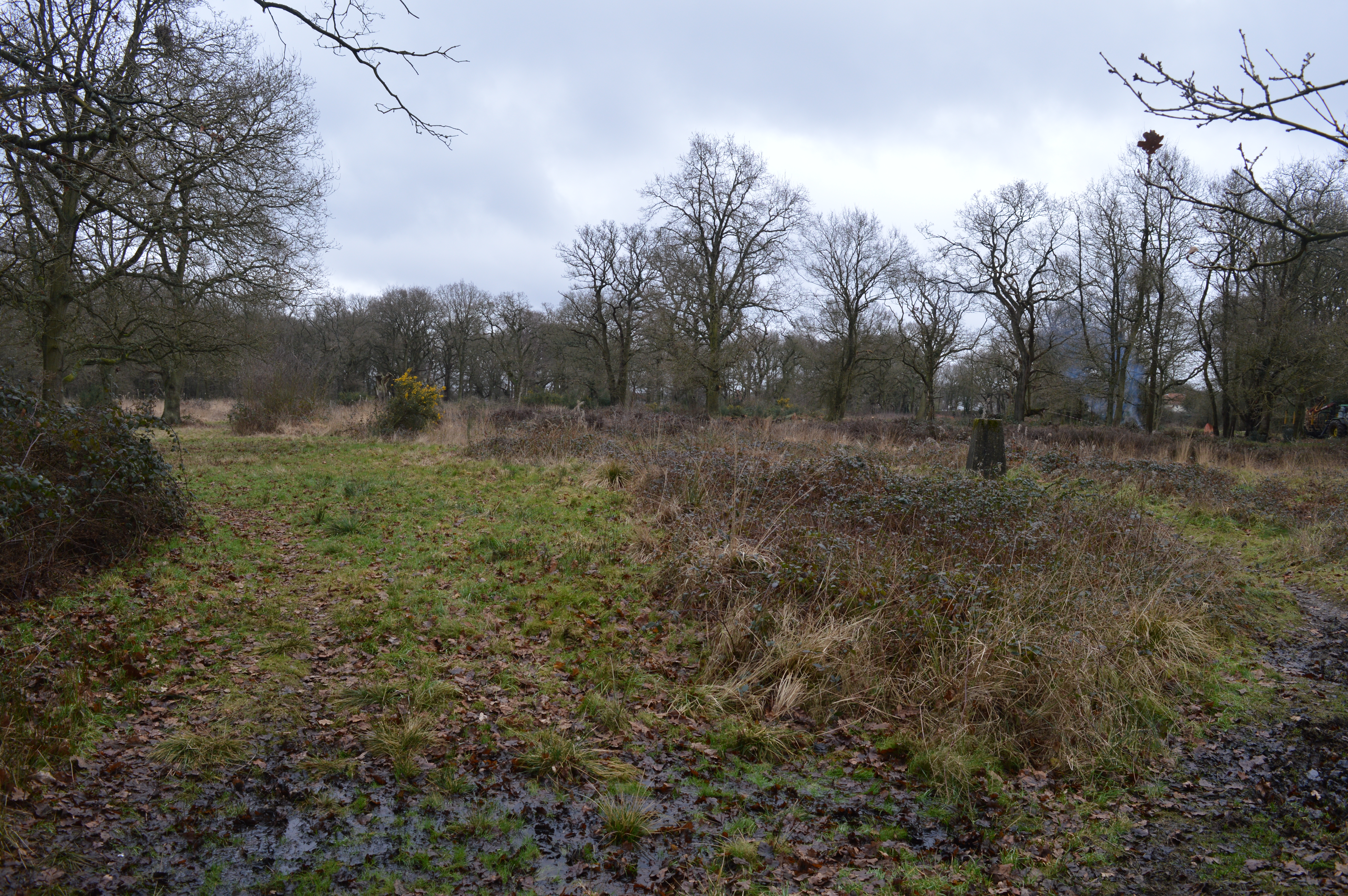
Hertford Heath south

Hertford Heath nature reserve is a 28 hectare biological Site of Special Scientific Interest in Hertford Heath in Hertfordshire. It is managed by the Herts and Middlesex Wildlife Trust and the local planning authority is East Hertfordshire District Council.

Heathland is a threatened habitat in southern England, and this site is a good example of lowland heath on pebble gravels, with open areas which have freely draining acidic soils. The heath is dominated by heather, and there are grass snakes and slow worms. Sphagnum mosses and creeping willow are found in wetter areas. Secondary woodland on acid London clay is mainly oak and hornbeam, with an understorey of holly. Ponds support the rare water violet and a rich invertebrate fauna such as great crested and smooth newts, the water spider and eight species of dragonfly. Birds include the great-spotted woodpecker and nuthatch.

The reserve is in two parts on either side of London Road. The southern part is accessed from The Roundings, next to the College Arms public house. It adjoins Balls Wood, which is also managed by the Herts and Middlesex Wildlife Trust. The northern area is off Heath Lane, opposite the pub.
