= Croglin =

Village in Cumbria, England

Coordinates: 54.817°N 2.665°W

- Village
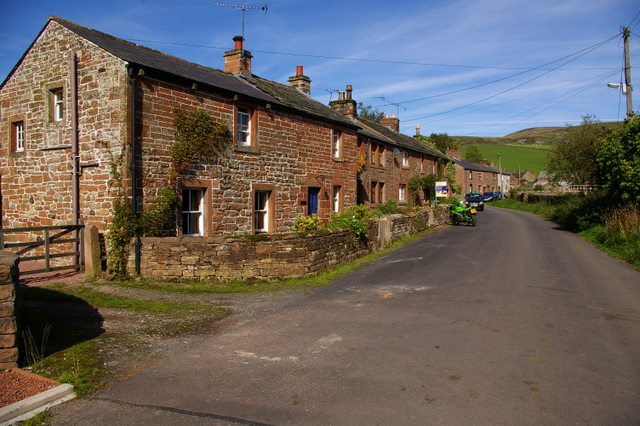
- Croglin

- Location in the former Eden District Location within Cumbria
- OS grid reference: NY572471
- Civil parish: Ainstable
- Unitary authority: Westmorland and Furness
- Ceremonial county: Cumbria
- Region: North West
- Country: England
- Sovereign state: United Kingdom
- Post town: CARLISLE
- Postcode district: CA4
- Dialling code: 01768
- Police: Cumbria
- Fire: Cumbria
- Ambulance: North West
- UK Parliament: Penrith and Solway

Croglin is the name of a village, former civil parish, beck (stream), and grange now in the parish of Ainstable, in the Westmorland and Furness district, Cumbria, England. Croglin is a quiet picturesque fellside village between the Pennines and the River Eden, about 14 miles (23 km) south-east of Carlisle. The surrounding land is used for agriculture, mainly sheep. A small river, Croglin Water, flows through the valley down into the River Eden. In 1931 the parish had a population of 198.

A village has existed in this location for a long time and may originally have been two separate hamlets. There has been a church on the current site since the Norman period, but the present building, dedicated to St. John the Baptist, was erected in 1878 to a design by J. Hewison of Edinburgh. There is a post office, which opens two mornings a week, and a pub, the Robin Hood.

Because of its proximity to the Scottish borders, the village was often raided by the Border Reivers in the 15th century. The lower two stories of a pele tower still survive, incorporated into the house formerly known as Croglin Vicarage, now The Old Pele, a testament to that need for defence.

A toy manufacturer, Croglin Toys, was set up in the village in 1980, but now operates from nearby Lazonby. A small dairy in the area, Thornby Moor Dairy, founded in 1979, has developed a type of cheese made from ewe's milk, known as Croglin Cheese.

== History ==
The name Croglin is probably a compound of a Middle English word crōk, "bend", ultimately derived from Old Norse krókr, and Old English hlynn, "torrent". Though the location of Croglin favours this explanation, also possible is derivation from Brittonic crǖg, "abrupt/isolated hill" and lïnn, "a pool" is also possible (cf. Welsh crug-llyn).

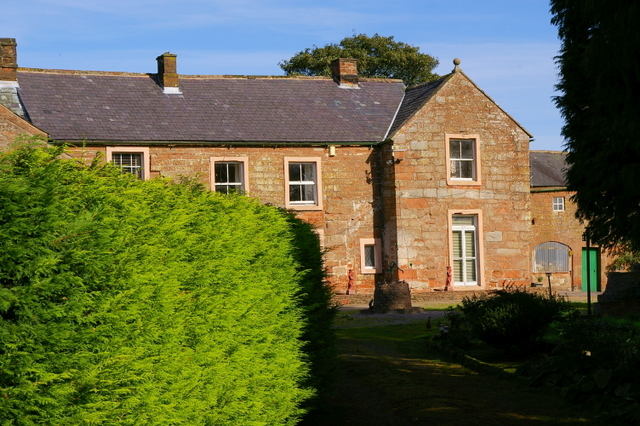
The Old Pele

On 1 April 1934 the parish was abolished and merged with Ainstable, part also went to Cumrew.

=== Alleged vampire case of 1874 ===
There is a tale of a vampire associated with the area. It has several versions. However, though the story is alleged to have occurred in 1874, there is no mention or evidence in historical records about the supposed event from before 1900. The author of a well-known version of the story claimed it was "told to him in 1874", but never bothered to share the story publicly until many decades later. The descendants of the supposed witness of the supposed case later grew to believe the story without question. Several key details in the claimed story do not add up with local geographic details as they were in the early 1870s. The entire story is likely a complete fiction, an anecdote by a relative that was taken far too seriously by the later author, or a heavily embellished version of an unrelated assault by a local (later exaggerated as a lurid tale of a vampire attack).

== See also ==
- Listed buildings in Ainstable
- Croglin Grange
