= Ruckcroft =

Hamlet in Cumbria, England

Coordinates: 54.790°N 2.729°W

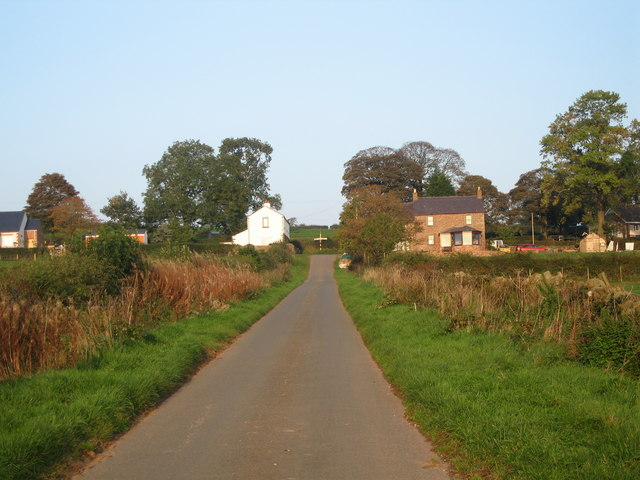
- Ruckcroft

- Location in former Eden District, Cumbria Location within Cumbria
- OS grid reference: NY531441
- Civil parish: Ainstable
- Unitary authority: Westmorland and Furness
- Ceremonial county: Cumbria
- Region: North West
- Country: England
- Sovereign state: United Kingdom
- Post town: CARLISLE
- Postcode district: CA4
- Dialling code: 01768
- Police: Cumbria
- Fire: Cumbria
- Ambulance: North West
- UK Parliament: Penrith and Solway

Ruckcroft is a hamlet in the English county of Cumbria. It neighbours the larger settlements of Armathwaite and Ainstable. In the past Ruckcroft had a pub but this is now a private home.

== See also ==
- Listed buildings in Ainstable
