= Hertford Heath =

Village in Hertfordshire, England

Coordinates: 51°47′N 0°3′W

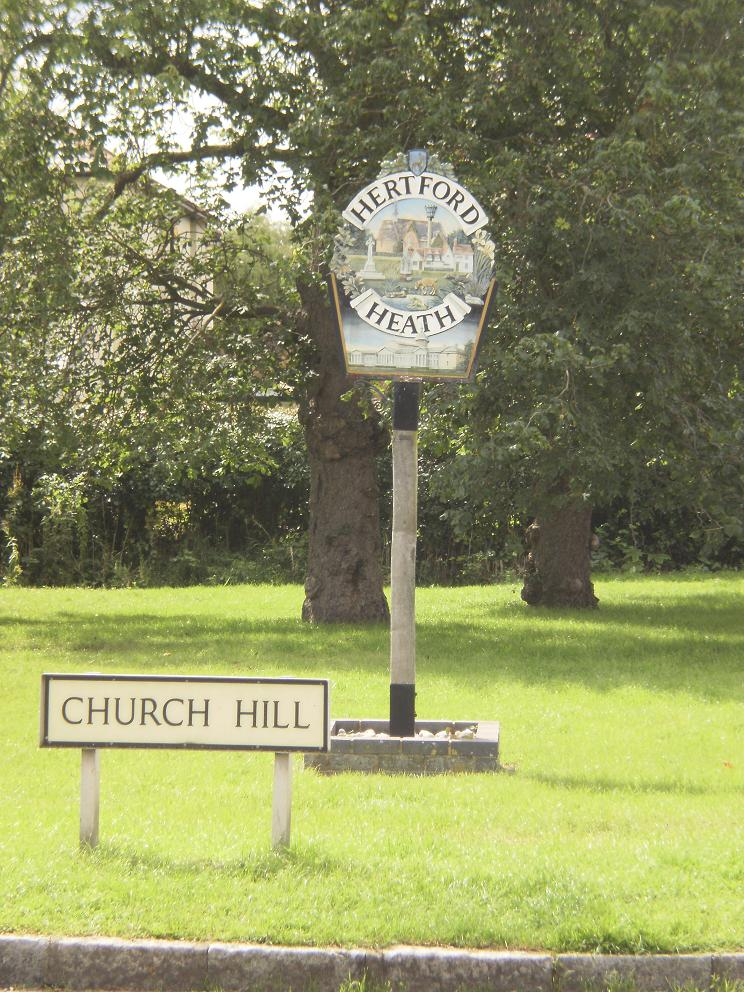
- Hertford Heath village green

- Location within Hertfordshire
- Population: 2,831 (Parish, 2021)
- Civil parish: Hertford Heath
- District: East Hertfordshire
- Shire county: Hertfordshire
- Region: East
- Country: England
- Sovereign state: United Kingdom
- Post town: Hertford
- Postcode district: SG13
- Police: Hertfordshire
- Fire: Hertfordshire
- Ambulance: East of England
- UK Parliament: Broxbourne

Hertford Heath is a village and civil parish in the East Hertfordshire district of Hertfordshire, England. It lies 1.5 miles (2.4 km) south-east of the county town of Hertford, which is also its post town. At the 2021 census the parish had a population of 2,831.

== Geography ==
It is located on a heath above the River Lea valley, on its south side. Almost all of the village is 90 metres (300 feet) above sea level, with most of the surrounding fields being arable farm land, or cattle and horse grazing.

== History ==
Hertford Heath was once a settlement of the Catuvellauni tribe, before Julius Caesar invaded in 54 BC.

The original hamlet of Hertford Heath was the southern part of the modern village along London Road, and was in the parish of Great Amwell. A separate village and parish called Little Amwell was centred on a village green a short distance to the north of Hertford Heath. During the twentieth century the urban areas of the two villages merged and the combined village became known generally as Hertford Heath.

In 1956 builders laying concrete for the garages in Trinity Road, came across a Belgic grave from about the 40–50 AD period, early Iron Age pottery was discovered and remnants are available to view in the British Museum.

More extensive historical facts can be found here extrapolated from a note written by Esme Nix of Rush Green (an area nestled in the corner of Downfield Road, Hoe Lane, Gallows Hill and the A10, giving the service station and A10 junction its name.)

== Governance ==
Hertford Heath is part of the district of East Hertfordshire and the county of Hertfordshire. The civil parish of Hertford Heath was created on 1 April 1990 from the former parish of Little Amwell, which was abolished, and parts of the neighbouring parishes of Great Amwell, Stanstead St Margarets, and Ware. The parish is administered by Hertford Heath Parish Council. Whilst the civil parish is called Hertford Heath, the ecclesiastical parish which covers the area is called "Holy Trinity, Little Amwell".

== Historic amenities ==
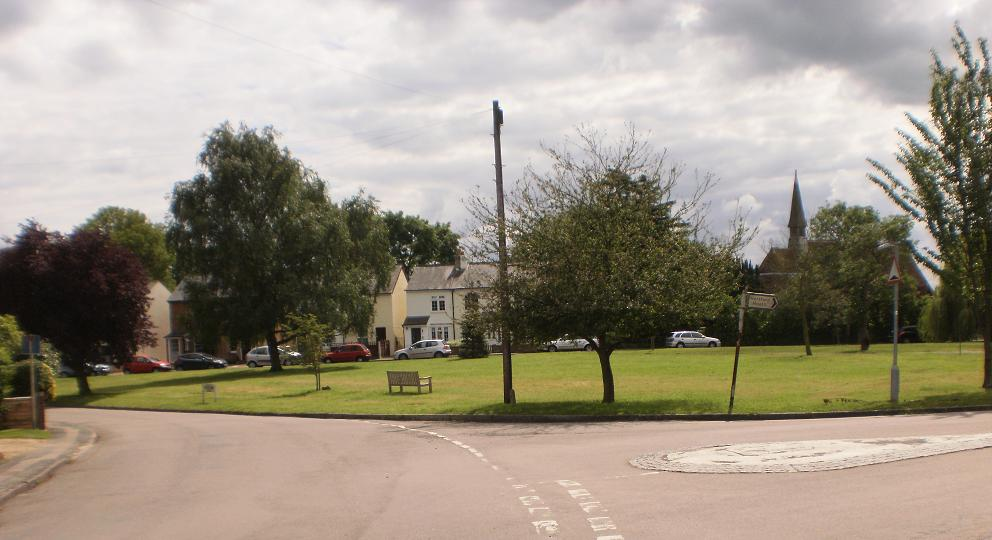
Hertford Heath village green viewed from near The Goat public house

- The Goat Inn at the junction of Vicarage Causeway and Downfield Road is the oldest building in the village, with cartography dating pre-1756 showing its location and existence. Local legend suggests that Dick Turpin may have patronised The Goat Inn.
- The College Arms (formerly the Jolly Pindar, and prior to that, the East India College Arms – linked to the then East India Company College [1805], now Haileybury College) is now a modern gastropub.

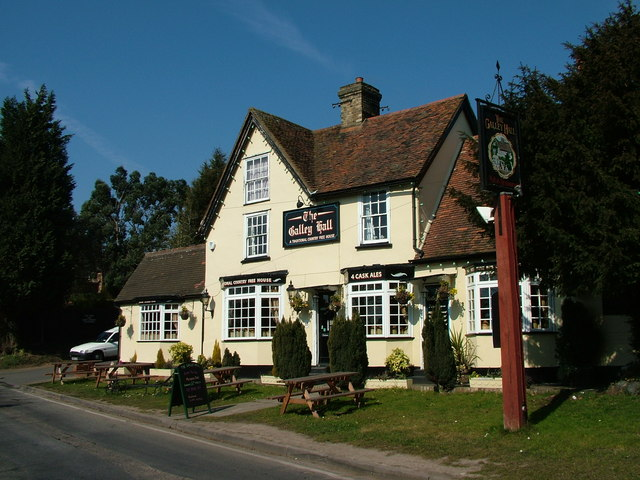
The Galley Hall public house.

The village has other modest amenities including a convenience store, public houses, eateries and a service station among others.

== Schools ==
Hertford Heath Junior Mixed Infant (JMI) School caters for children from Nursery up to Year 6 (leavers for Secondary Education).

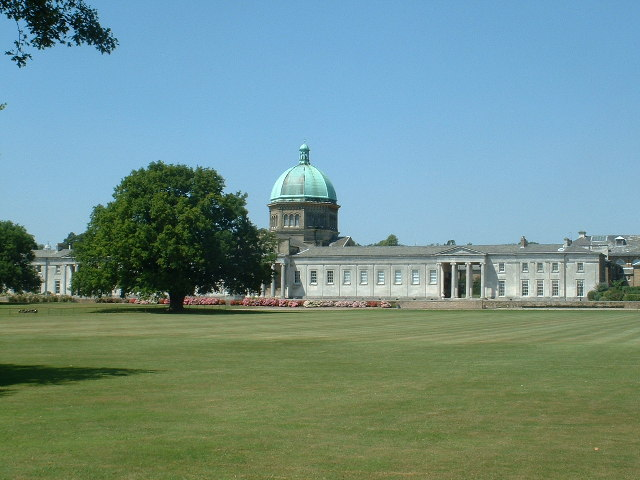
Haileybury College is close to the village.

Haileybury College, a private boarding school (formerly the East India Company College [1805], Imperial Service College [1845] and United Services College [1874]) is on the south-east boundary of the village. It offers facilities to the village and public at large who are able, subject to availability, to use its modern sports complex which includes:

- a 25-metre deck level indoor heated swimming pool
- an 8-court badminton hall
- 4 squash courts
- all-weather surface (with floodlights)
- a state-of-the-art fitness suite
- 8 tennis courts (summer only)

== Notable locations and buildings ==
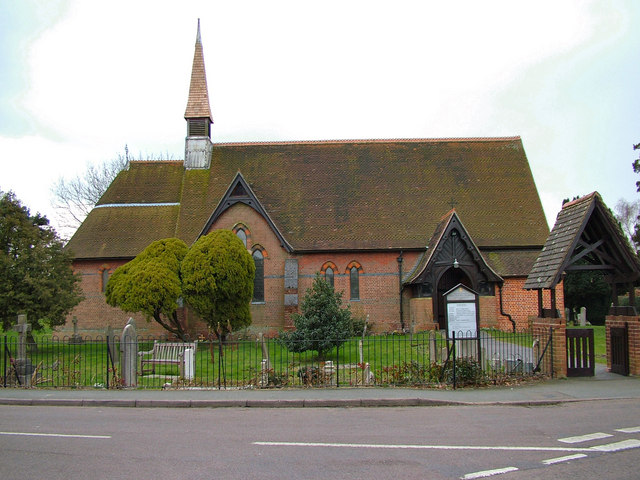
Holy Trinity Church, the Church of England parish church for the ecclesiastical parish of Little Amwell.

- The Village Hall – plays host to events such as the local farmers' market and the Annual Horticultural Society show
- Holy Trinity Church (Little Amwell) led by the Rev. Nick Sharp. It was built in 1863 to the design of Ewan Christian in the Early English Gothic style. It is a Grade II listed building. The church celebrated its 150th anniversary in 2013.
- Ermine Street, the former Roman Road from London to York, runs from the rear of Hertford Heath Motors to Goose Green near Hoddesdon and onwards to London (it is now a bridleway to the South. The former route across the village through what is now Hogsdell Lane, on to Rush Green, has been bisected by the main route through Hertford Heath (B1197) and the development of housing across the village.
- The Hertford Heath nature reserve and Balls Wood nature reserve cover nearly 80 hectares of surrounding countryside and woodland. Hertford Heath is a Site of Special Scientific Interest, and both sites are managed by the Herts and Middlesex Wildlife Trust. Balls Wood was purchased by the Trust from the Forestry Commission following a successful campaign.

== Notable residents ==
- Florence L. Barclay (1862–1921): a romance novelist and short story writer. She was the wife of Reverend Charles W. Barclay, who was the vicar of Holy Trinity from 1881 to 1920.
- Vera Barclay (1893–1989): the daughter of Florence and Charles Barclay. She was Co-founder of Cubs & was a pioneer of female leadership in the Scout Movement and was instrumental in the establishment of the Wolf Cub programme in the United Kingdom and France. She later became a prolific author on a range of subjects, especially children's stories.

== Freedom of the Parish ==
The following people and military units have received the Freedom of the Parish of Hertford Heath.

=== Individuals ===
- Frederick "Fred" Harrington.
- Lilly Bean.
- Gerald Nix: January 2000.
- Robert "Bob" Akers.

== See also ==
- Hertford
- Hertfordshire
- Lea Valley
