= Armathwaite, Tennessee =

- Unincorporated community
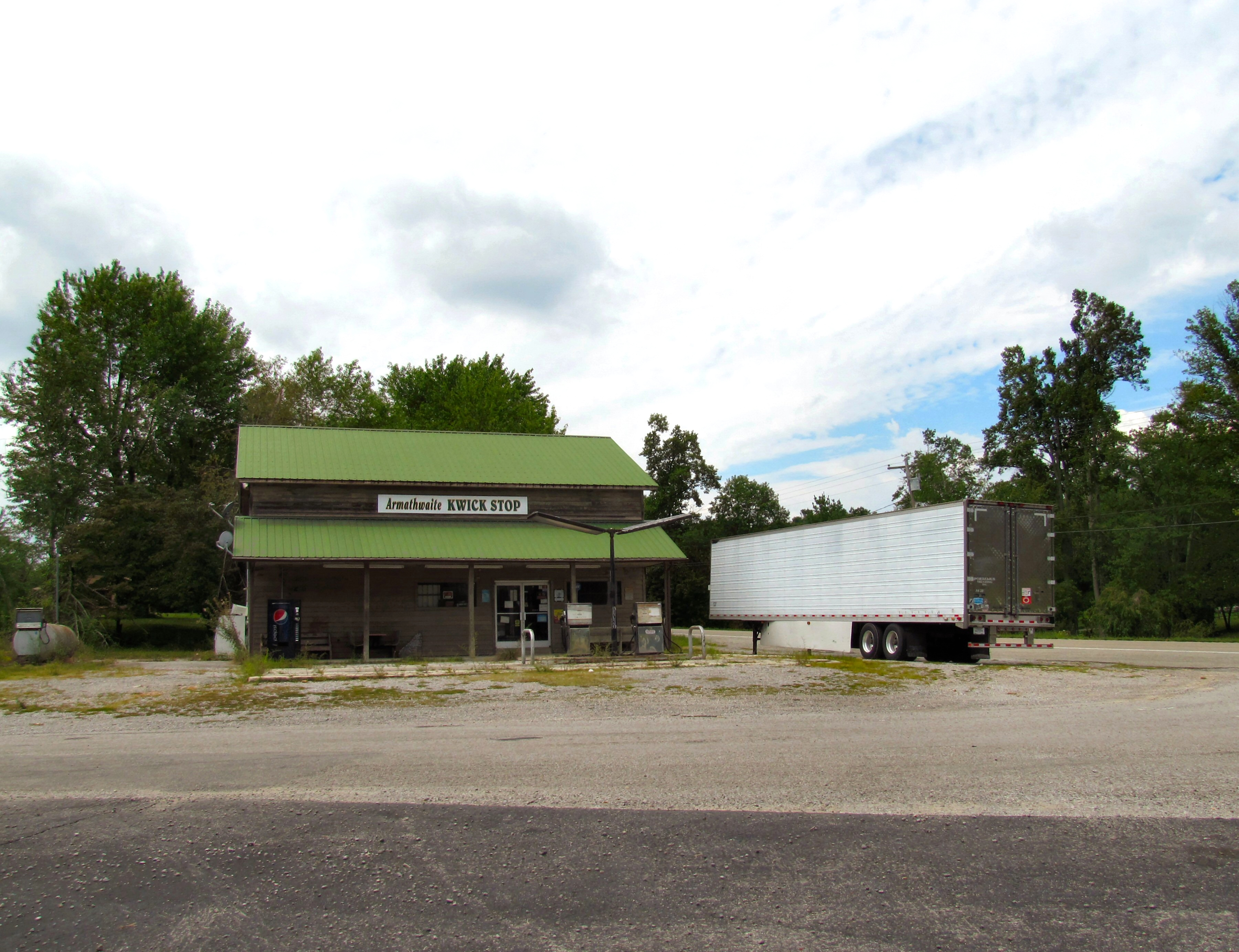

- Location within Tennessee Location within the United States
- Coordinates: 36°22′27″N 84°46′55″W
- Country: United States
- State: Tennessee
- County: Fentress
- Elevation: 1,470 ft (450 m)
- Time zone: UTC-6 (Central (CST))
  - Summer (DST): UTC-5 (CDT)
- ZIP code: 38504
- Area code: 931
- GNIS feature ID: 1314597

Armathwaite is an unincorporated community in Fentress County, Tennessee, United States. It is located along Tennessee State Route 52 between Allardt and Rugby, in Tennessee's Cumberland Plateau region. The Big South Fork National River and Recreation Area is located to the northeast.

The community was first settled in the 1840s. Around 1881, Alwyn Maude, a Rugby colonist, established a post office in the community, and named it for his home village of Armathwaite in England. Oil drilling and logging activities took place in the area during the late 19th and early 20th centuries.
