= Balls Wood =

Nature reserve in Hertfordshire, England

Coordinates: 51.7778°N 0.04746°W

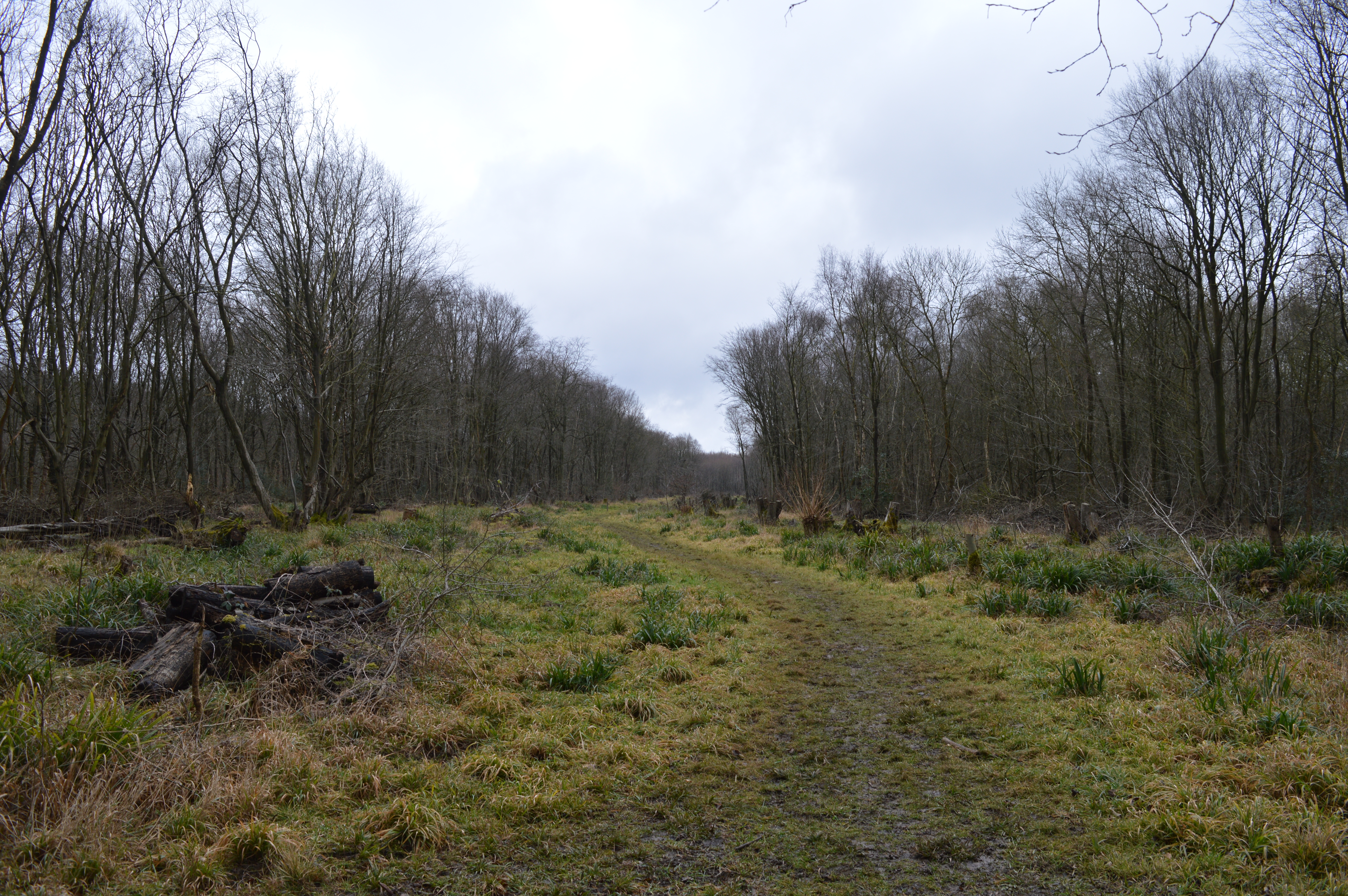

Balls Wood is a 58.5-hectare (145-acre) nature reserve managed by the Herts and Middlesex Wildlife Trust in Hertford Heath in East Hertfordshire. The wood was purchased by the Trust from the Forestry Commission.

The northern part has mature coppiced hornbeams together with ash and field maple. There are breeding birds such as great spotted woodpeckers and sparrowhawks. The site also has open rides which provide a habitat for insects such as white admiral butterflies and wild flowers including bluebells, wood anemones and early purple orchids. There are many ponds which support aquatic invertebrates.

There is access by going along The Roundings from London Road past Hertford Heath nature reserve, turning right along Elbow Lane and left into Balls Wood.
