= Effingham Low House =

- U.S. National Register of Historic Places
- New Jersey Register of Historic Places
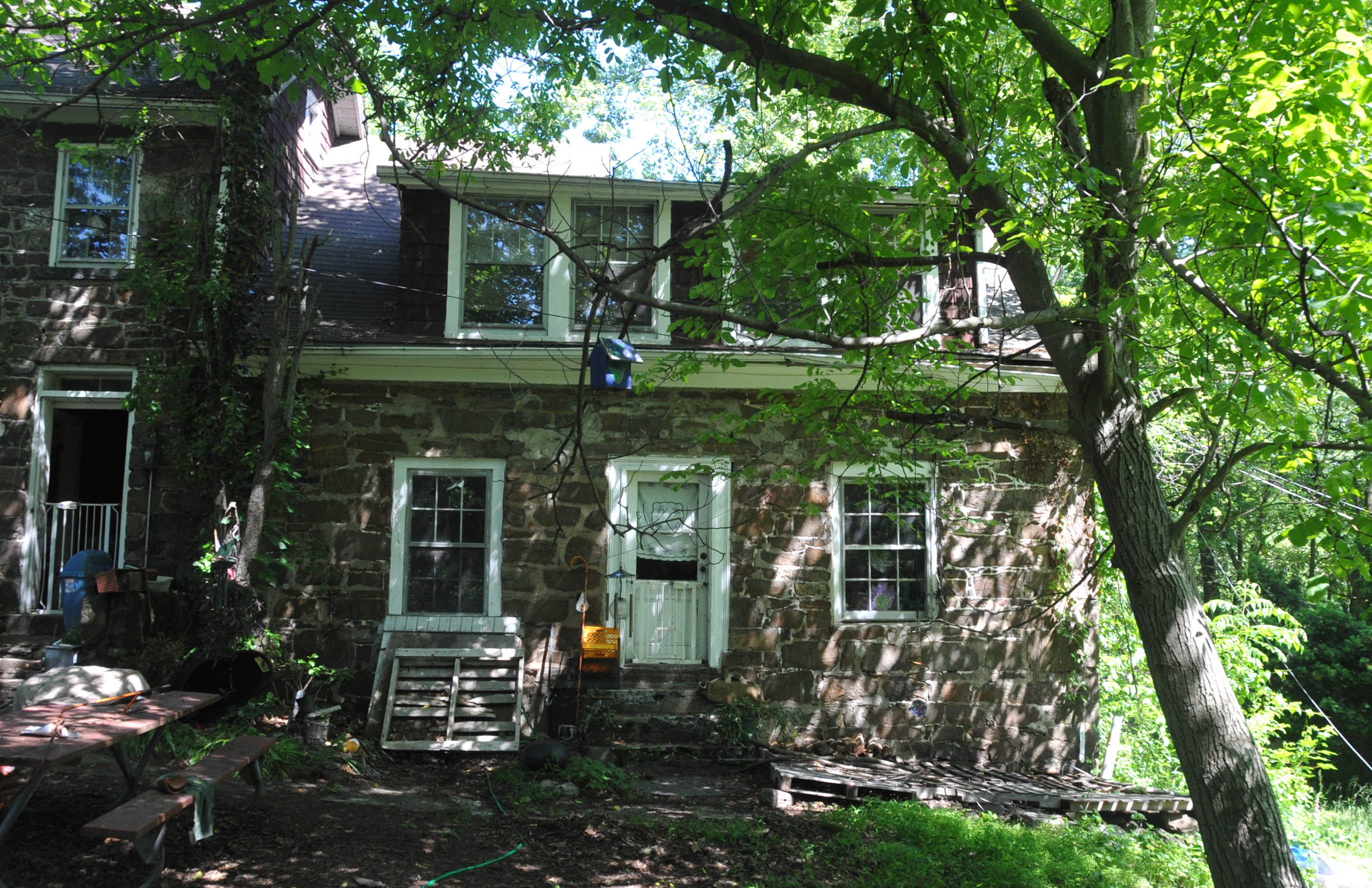

- Location within Morris County, New Jersey Location within New Jersey Location within the United States
- Location: 102 Hook Mountain Road; Pine Brook, New Jersey
- Coordinates: 40°52′37″N 74°20′18″W
- Area: 17.8 acres (7.2 ha)
- Architectural style: Colonial, Dutch Colonial
- MPS: Dutch Stone Houses in Montville MPS
- NRHP reference No.: 91001930
- NJRHP No.: 2157

Significant dates
- Added to NRHP: January 17, 1992
- Designated NJRHP: November 25, 1991

The Effingham Low House is a historic house located at 102 Hook Mountain Road in the Pine Brook section of the township of Montville in Morris County, New Jersey. It was added to the National Register of Historic Places on January 17, 1992, for its significance in architecture. The house was listed as part of the Dutch Stone Houses in Montville Multiple Property Submission (MPS).

== History and description ==
The oldest section of the house was built by Effingham Low sometime before 1775. The one and one-half stone house features local Dutch Colonial architecture. His son, Nicholas Low inherited the property in 1812. The two-story Federal style stone addition was built by him around 1820.

== See also ==
- National Register of Historic Places listings in Morris County, New Jersey
- List of the oldest buildings in New Jersey
