= Rye Cross =

Hamlet in Worcestershire, England

Coordinates: 52.0192°N 2.325°W

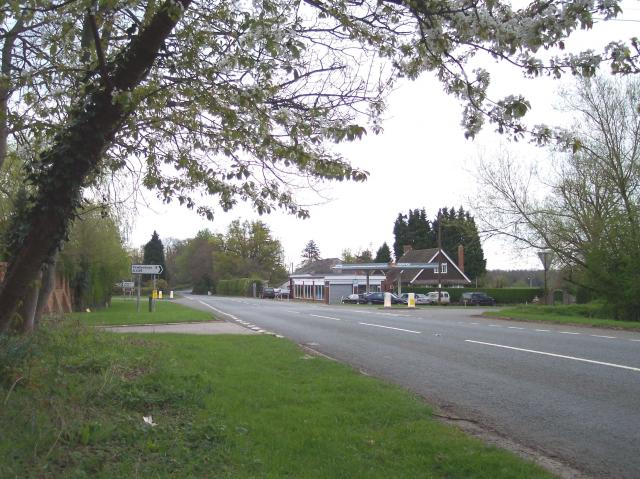
- Rye Cross

- Location within Worcestershire
- OS grid reference: SO777356
- District: Malvern Hills
- Shire county: Worcestershire
- Region: West Midlands
- Country: England
- Sovereign state: United Kingdom
- Post town: MALVERN
- Postcode district: WR13
- Police: West Mercia
- Fire: Hereford and Worcester
- Ambulance: West Midlands
- UK Parliament: West Worcestershire

Rye Cross is a hamlet in south-west Worcestershire 1 mile west of Castlemorton, 0.5 miles east of Berrow and 1 mile south of Hollybush, near the borders of Gloucestershire and Herefordshire. Eastnor Castle and the towns of Malvern, and Ledbury are nearby. There are several traditional English pubs in the area.

== Population ==
The 2000 census showed the area to have a population of <700 (Castlemorton, Birtsmorton, Rye Cross, Berrow predominantly)
