= Roskorwell =

Coordinates: 50°4′23″N 5°5′2″W

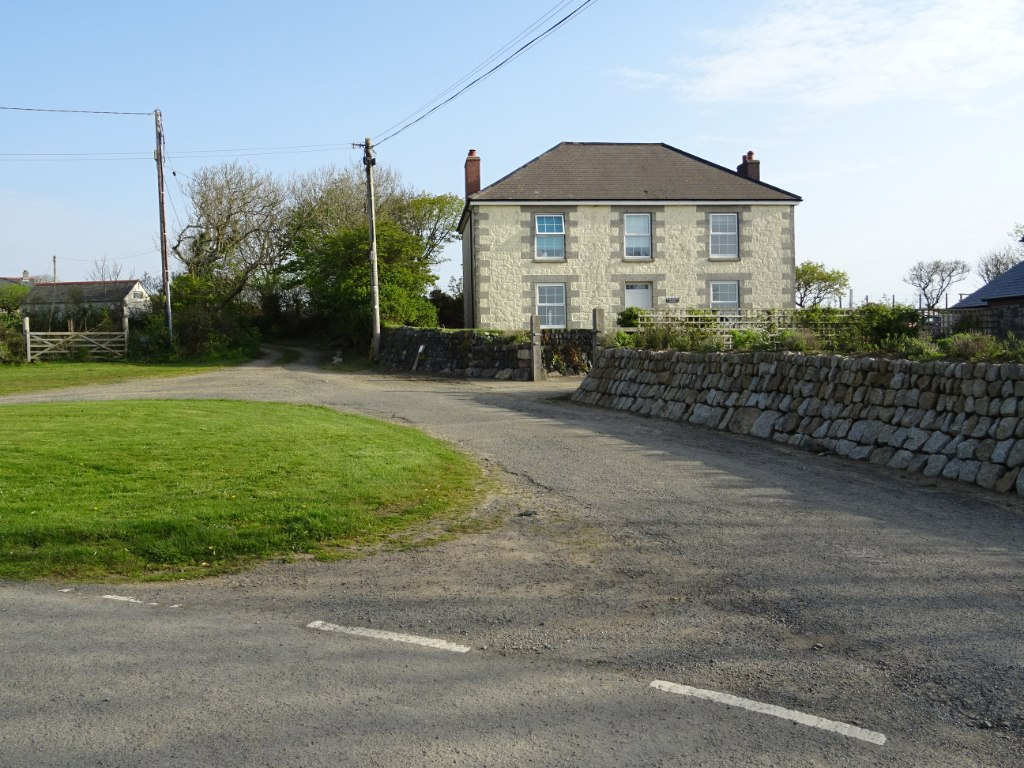

- Location within Cornwall
- Civil parish: St Keverne
- Unitary authority: Cornwall
- Ceremonial county: Cornwall
- Region: South West
- Country: England
- Sovereign state: United Kingdom
- Police: Devon and Cornwall
- Fire: Cornwall
- Ambulance: South Western

Roskorwell (Cornish: Roskorvil) is a hamlet in the civil parish of St Keverne, in Cornwall, England, United Kingdom. It lies just north of Porthallow.

The name Roskorwell comes from the Cornish language words ros, meaning 'hill-spur', and Korvil, a personal name.
