= Dale, Cumbria =

Hamlet in Cumbria, England

Coordinates: 54.789°N 2.710°W

Dale
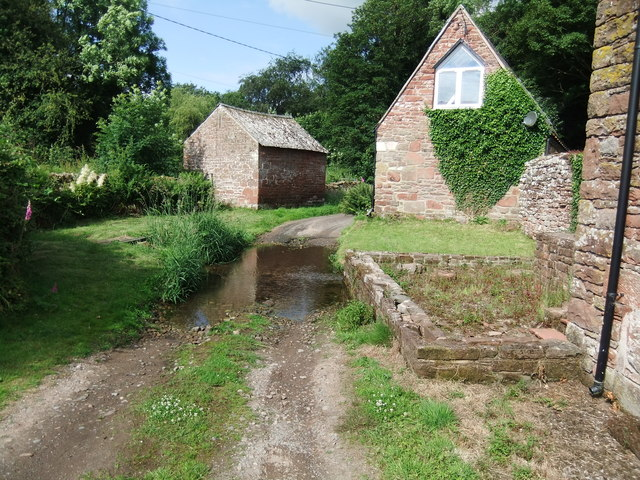
- The ford at Dale

- Location in former Eden District, Cumbria Location within Cumbria
- OS grid reference: NY543440
- Civil parish: Ainstable
- Unitary authority: Westmorland and Furness
- Ceremonial county: Cumbria
- Region: North West
- Country: England
- Sovereign state: United Kingdom
- Post town: CARLISLE
- Postcode district: CA4
- Dialling code: 01768
- Police: Cumbria
- Fire: Cumbria
- Ambulance: North West
- UK Parliament: Penrith and Solway

Dale is a hamlet in Cumbria, England.
