= Rushall, Herefordshire =

Coordinates: 52.012°N 2.525°W

Rushall
- Hamlet

- Location within Herefordshire
- OS grid reference: SO 64178 35016
- Shire county: Herefordshire
- Region: West Midlands
- Country: England
- Sovereign state: United Kingdom
- Post town: LEDBURY
- Postcode district: HR8

Rushall is a small hamlet in Herefordshire, England. It is approximately halfway between Woolhope and Much Marcle.
