= Roundthwaite =

Village in Cumbria, England

Coordinates: 54.424°N 2.605°W

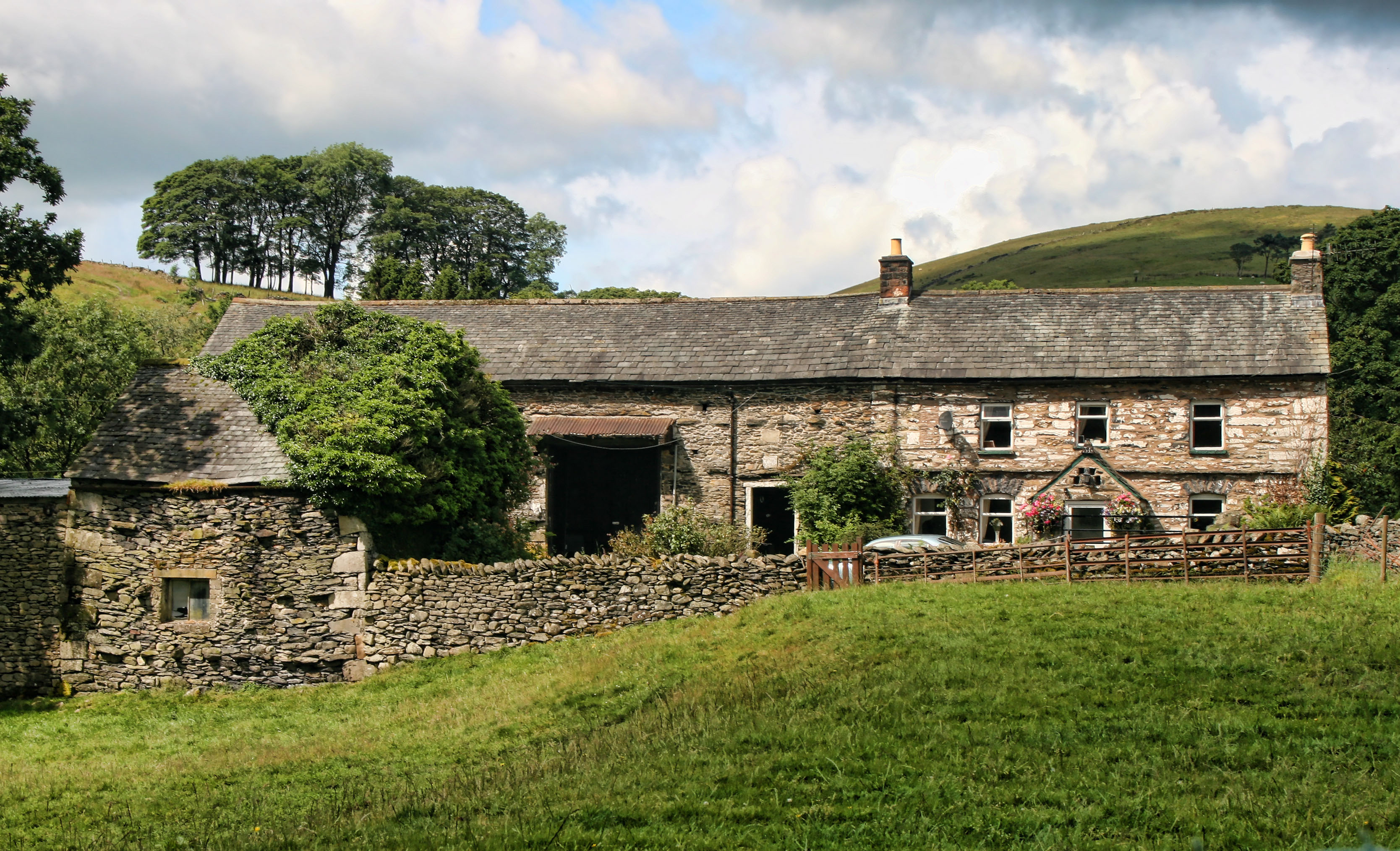
- Roundthwaite Farm

- Location in Eden, Cumbria Location within Cumbria
- OS grid reference: NY607033
- Civil parish: Tebay
- Unitary authority: Westmorland and Furness
- Ceremonial county: Cumbria
- Region: North West
- Country: England
- Sovereign state: United Kingdom
- Post town: PENRITH
- Postcode district: CA10
- Dialling code: 015396
- Police: Cumbria
- Fire: Cumbria
- Ambulance: North West
- UK Parliament: Westmorland and Lonsdale

Roundthwaite is a small village in Cumbria, England. It is located about a mile south west of Tebay, is part of the Tebay parish, and the majority of its land is used for farming.

Roundthwaite used to go by the name Runthwate.

Roundthwaite is mostly inhabited by the Parsley family.
