= Ainstable =

Village and civil parish in Cumbria, England

Coordinates: 54.800°N 2.733°W

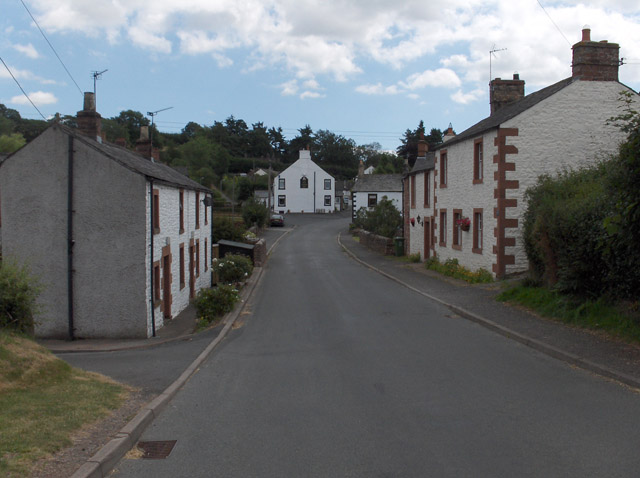
- Ainstable

- Location within Cumbria
- Population: 570 (2011)
- OS grid reference: NY5346
- Civil parish: Ainstable
- Unitary authority: Westmorland and Furness
- Ceremonial county: Cumbria
- Region: North West
- Country: England
- Sovereign state: United Kingdom
- Post town: CARLISLE
- Postcode district: CA4
- Dialling code: 01768
- Police: Cumbria
- Fire: Cumbria
- Ambulance: North West
- UK Parliament: Penrith and Solway

Ainstable is a village and civil parish in the English county of Cumbria. Historically part of the traditional county of Cumberland, it is now in the unitary authority area of Westmorland and Furness.

The parish stretches from the banks of the River Eden to the summits of the North Pennines where it borders Northumberland and includes the villages of Croglin and Newbiggin as well as the hamlets of Dale, Walmersyke, Ruckcroft and Longdales and part of the village of Armathwaite.

== History ==
Ainstable was the site of a Benedictine convent (the manor of "Nunnery"). This is said to date from the reign of William Rufus. However, Pevsner says that "the earliest reference is 1200. The nuns were so harassed by the Scots that in 1480 they had to reinvent their own charter, spuriously dating their foundation to 1089 and William Rufus." After the closure of the monasteries, the convent building became a private home, held for many years by the Aglionby family, and is now a guesthouse.

The parish church was rebuilt in 1816. Ainstable has a number of historic industrial sites, including the Eden Valley Woollen Mill.

== Development ==
The former village pub, the New Crown Inn, has closed and been sold for redevelopment.

In 2014 Eden District Council rejected a fiercely opposed plan to erect a wind turbine near to the village and the neighbouring village of Armathwaite.

== Toponymy ==
"This name, as first noted by Lindkvist (41-2), is a compound of ON 'einstapi', 'bracken' and 'hlíđ' 'slope'." ('ON' is Old Norse).

== Notable people ==
Dr John Leake, who founded the General Lying-In Hospital in London, was a native of Ainstable.

== See also ==
- Listed buildings in Ainstable
