= Rosenithon =

Coordinates: 50°03′02″N 5°04′22″W

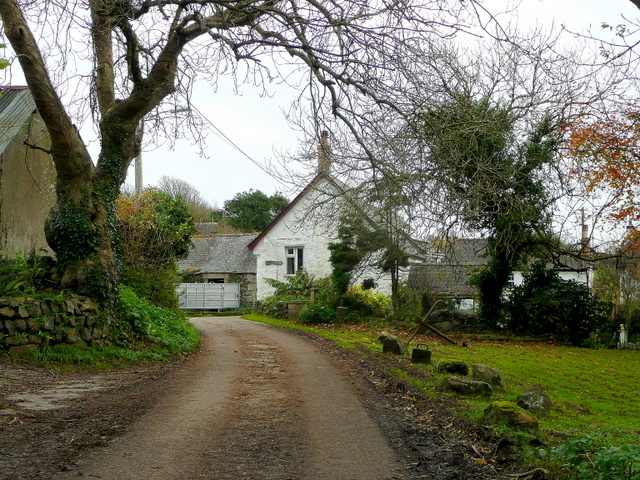
Rosenithon

Rosenithon (Cornish: Ros an Eythin) is a hamlet east of St Keverne in west Cornwall, England.

The name Rosenithon comes from the Cornish language Ros an Eythin, which means 'the hill-spur of gorse'.
