= Roskear Croft =

Coordinates: 50.230°N 5.292°W

- Location within Cornwall
- OS grid reference: SW653418
- Unitary authority: Cornwall
- Ceremonial county: Cornwall
- Region: South West
- Country: England
- Sovereign state: United Kingdom

Roskear Croft is a hamlet north of Camborne, Cornwall, England.
