= Ryton Woodside =

Hamlet in Tyne and Wear, England

Coordinates: 54.96168°N 1.77485°W

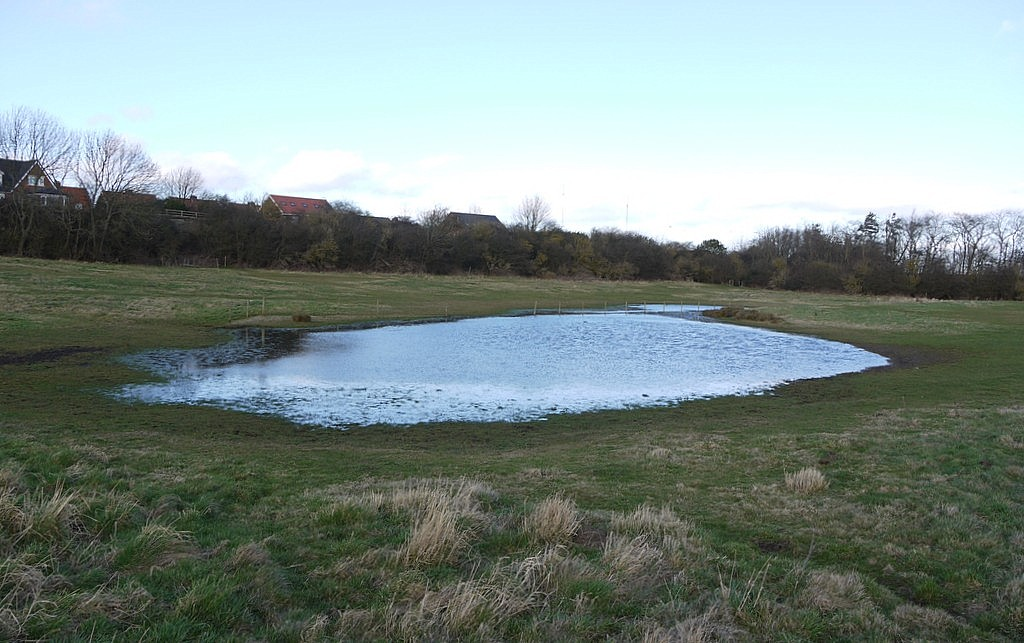
- A pond in the former parish

- Location within Tyne and Wear
- Metropolitan borough: Gateshead
- Metropolitan county: Tyne and Wear
- Region: North East
- Country: England
- Sovereign state: United Kingdom

Ryton Woodside is a hamlet south of Ryton, in the Gateshead district, in the county of Tyne and Wear, England. It is near the A659 road. Ryton Woodside is north east of Greenside and south of Ryton. In 1911 the parish had a population of 3043.

== History ==
Formerly designated as a township, it was described as a "straggling hamlet', in the 19th century, when its population varied from 885 people in 1801 to 1106 people in 1891. It covered an area of 2813 acres at that time. In 1866 Ryton Woodside became a civil parish in its own right, on 1 April 1914 the parish was abolished and merged with Ryton.
