= Low House, Wetheral =

House in Wetheral, Carlisle, Cumbria, UK

Coordinates: 54.8257°N 2.7573°W

Low House is an 18th-century Georgian manor house located one and a half miles north of the village of Armathwaite in the Eden Valley of Cumbria, England. It sits close to the River Eden, which flows through Cumbria up to the Solway Firth. The house is situated within Wetheral civil parish.

== History ==
The house is privately owned by the Ecroyd family. William Farrer Ecroyd was a successful politician who came from a family of mill owners and his father was regarded as a fair mill owner and were Quakers, a practice William abandoned. The fortunes which the mills provided were cast a deep blow thanks to The Great Depression in the 1930s. Subsequently, the family had to rebuild its wealth. The fourth generation of Ecroyds to live there, Mr Edward Peter Ecroyd held the position of High Sheriff of Cumbria in 1984, and since then the estate has been passed down to the next generation. The Ecroyd family Motto is In Veritate Victoria, which translates as In Truth and Victory.

== House ==
The house is Grade II listed, with the datestone showing that it was built in 1793, the architect being John Graham and over the years it has been subtly changed and improved by architects such as Martindale, with identical wings having been added, providing extra rooms downstairs and upstairs, including the main kitchen used today. The house sits in several acres of parkland and features a long driveway

== The Estate ==
The estate covers around 1,200 acres (490 ha) of arable farmland, including three main dairy farms, plus a stretch of the River Eden. There are other properties and buildings that belong to the estate which are all close by the house. Before the Great Depression, the estate as a whole once bordered the lands of Corby Castle but has since downsized due to financial issues.
