= Roser's Cross =

Village in East Sussex, England

Coordinates: 50.9642°N 0.2060°E

Roser's Cross is a village in the Wealden district of East Sussex.
