= Royal Oak, North Yorkshire =

Area in North Yorkshire, England

Coordinates: 54.189932°N 0.299115°W

Royal Oak
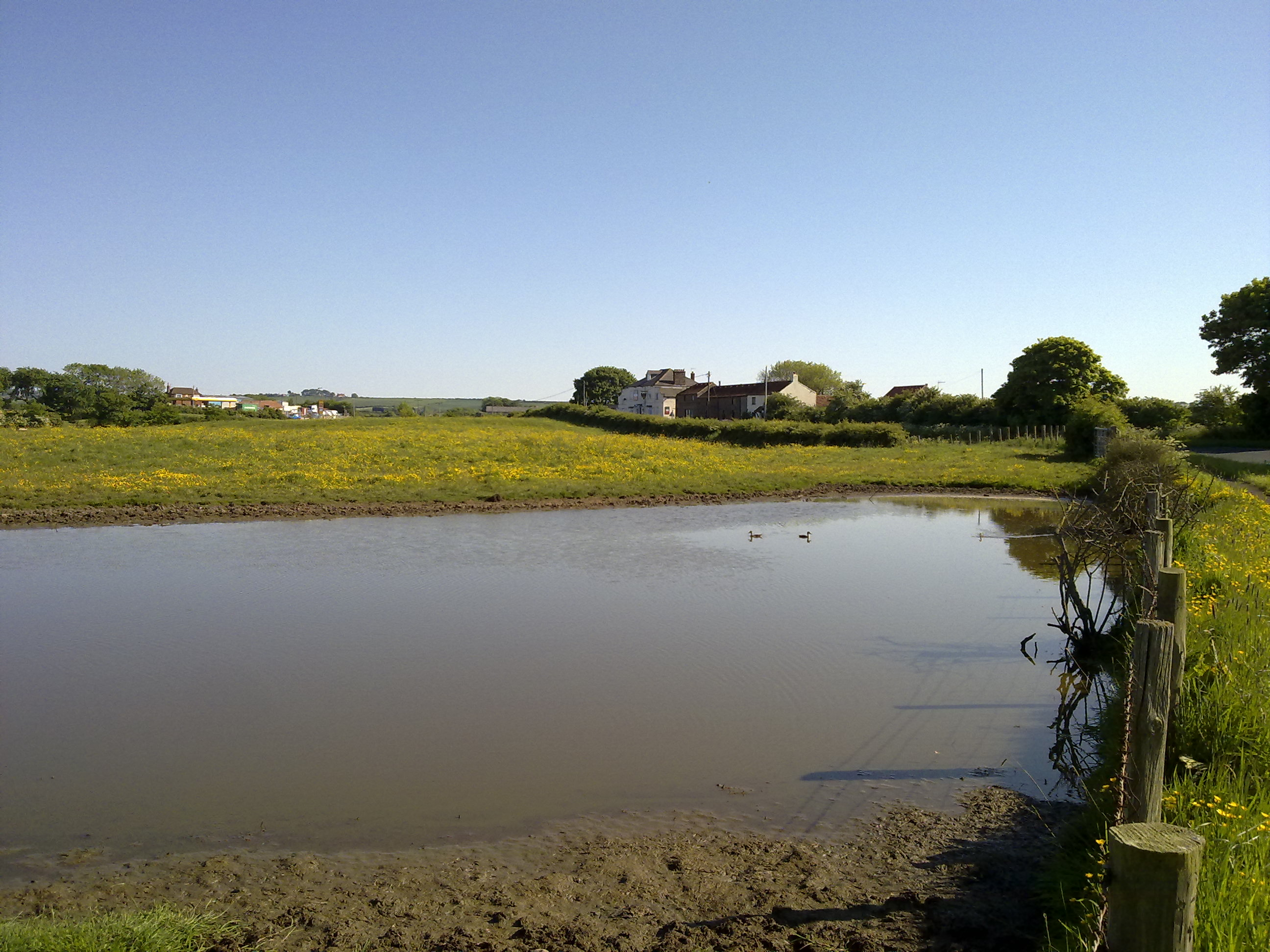
- Pond at the Royal Oak

- Location within North Yorkshire
- OS grid reference: TA110784
- Civil parish: Filey
- Unitary authority: North Yorkshire
- Ceremonial county: North Yorkshire
- Region: Yorkshire and the Humber
- Country: England
- Sovereign state: United Kingdom
- Post town: FILEY
- Postcode district: YO14
- Police: North Yorkshire
- Fire: North Yorkshire
- Ambulance: Yorkshire
- UK Parliament: Thirsk and Malton

Royal Oak is an area in North Yorkshire, England, between Scarborough and Bridlington, next to Filey and Hunmanby. The place itself is marked by a public house, also named The Royal Oak and a railway crossing on the Yorkshire Coast Line listed as being 43 miles 4 chains (69.3 km) north of Hull Paragon station. Two railway junctions that formed a spur to the railway station at Filey Holiday Camp were also located just to the south of the A165 crossing. These were known as the Royal Oak Junctions.

It is home to a string of bungalows, and across the A165 is a blue house which was formerly the Gate keepers Cottage. In front of the inn is the location of a deserted medieval village known as Fowthorpe. It was historically part of the East Riding of Yorkshire until 1974. From 1974 to 2023 it was part of the Borough of Scarborough, it is now administered by the unitary North Yorkshire Council.
