= Ruan High Lanes =

Coordinates: 50.222°N 4.942°W

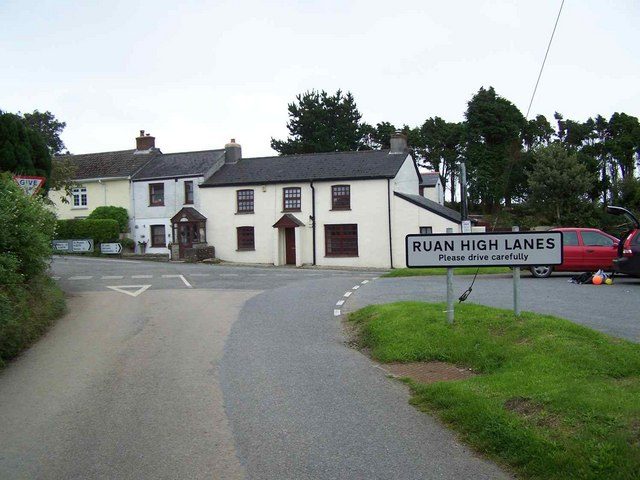
- Ruan High Lanes

- Location within Cornwall
- OS grid reference: SW902398
- Unitary authority: Cornwall
- Ceremonial county: Cornwall
- Region: South West
- Country: England
- Sovereign state: United Kingdom

Ruan High Lanes is a village west of Veryan in south Cornwall, England. The village is on the A3078 main road.

== See also ==
- Murder of Lyn Bryant – infamous unsolved murder which occurred here on 20 October 1998
