= Round Spinney =

- Locality
- Map showing location of Round Spinney
- Coordinates: 52°16′35.13″N 0°50′44.10″W
- Sovereign state: United Kingdom
- Ceremonial county: Northamptonshire
- Unitary authority: West Northamptonshire
- Civil parish: Northampton

Area
  - Total: 0.28 sq mi (0.72 km^{2})
- Elevation: 308 ft (94 m)

Round Spinney is a locality in the north-east of the town of Northampton, in the West Northamptonshire district, in the ceremonial county of Northamptonshire, England.

Round Spinney is located east of the main A43 road which runs from Northampton to Kettering. It gives its name to an Industrial Estate and the nearby roundabout.

The population at the 2011 Census was included in the Talavera ward of Northampton Borough Council.
