= Rosedinnick =

Hamlet in Cornwall, England

Coordinates: 50.456°N 4.940°W

- Location within Cornwall
- OS grid reference: SW914659
- Unitary authority: Cornwall
- Ceremonial county: Cornwall
- Region: South West
- Country: England
- Sovereign state: United Kingdom

Rosedinnick is a small hamlet in Cornwall, England. It is near the village of Talskiddy, in the north of the parish of St Columb Major.

The hamlet consists of a small number of dwellings, including two farmhouses. The name originates from the Cornish for "furzy hillspur".
