= Rose Green, Essex =

Hamlet in Essex, England

Coordinates: 51.921°N 0.766°E

Rose Green
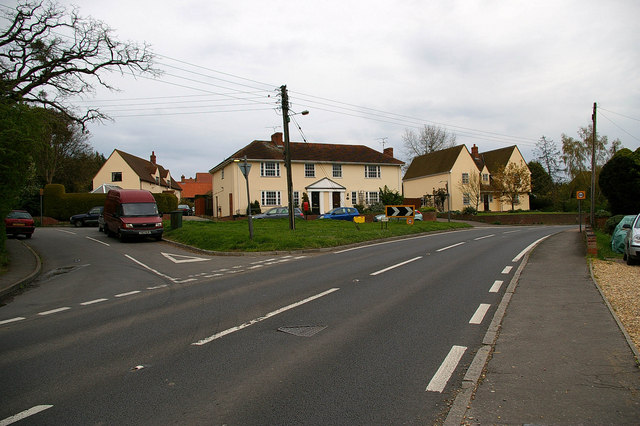

- Location within Essex
- Civil parish: Chappel
- District: Colchester
- Shire county: Essex
- Region: East
- Country: England
- Sovereign state: United Kingdom
- Police: Essex
- Fire: Essex
- Ambulance: East of England

Rose Green is a hamlet in the civil parish of Chappel, in the Colchester district, in the county of Essex, England. It is located on the A1124 road and the River Colne, near the village of Wakes Colne.
