= Roydhouse =

Hamlet in West Yorkshire, England

Coordinates: 53.6080°N 1.6754°W

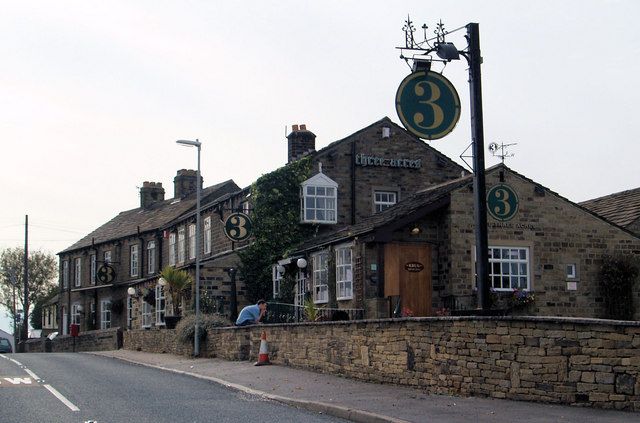
- Three Acres pub in Roydhouse

- Location within West Yorkshire
- Civil parish: Kirkburton
- Metropolitan borough: Kirklees
- Metropolitan county: West Yorkshire
- Region: Yorkshire and the Humber
- Country: England
- Sovereign state: United Kingdom
- Police: West Yorkshire
- Fire: West Yorkshire
- Ambulance: Yorkshire

Roydhouse is a hamlet in the civil parish of Kirkburton, in Kirklees, West Yorkshire, England. Roydhouse was recorded as "le Roides". It has a public house, the '3 Acres', on Drinker Lane.
