= Rush Green, East Hertfordshire =

Hamlet in Hertfordshire, England

Coordinates: 51°47′50″N 0°02′30″W

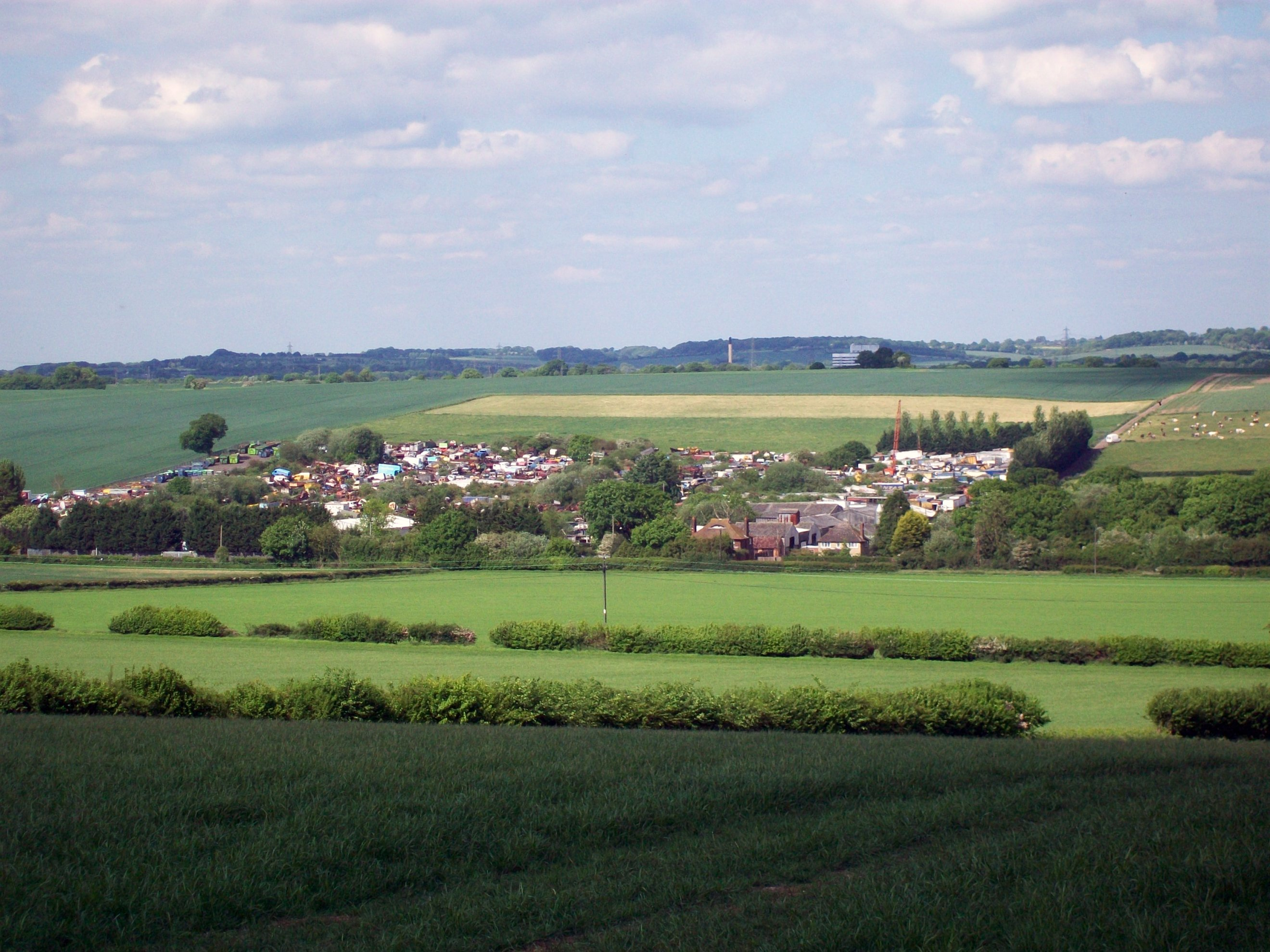
Rush Green

Rush Green is a hamlet on the outskirts of Hertford, Hertfordshire. The Roman road Ermine Street passed through Rush Green.

== Location ==
It is next to the Foxholes and Pinehurst housing estates, and bridges the gap between Hertford Heath and Hertford.

== Roundabout ==
The A10 road passes by, and is connected by the Rush Green roundabout.

Since the closure of McDonald's in Hertford Town Centre, Rush Green now contains the only McDonald's in Hertford.
