= Armathwaite =

Village in Cumbria, England

Coordinates: 54.807°N 2.771°W

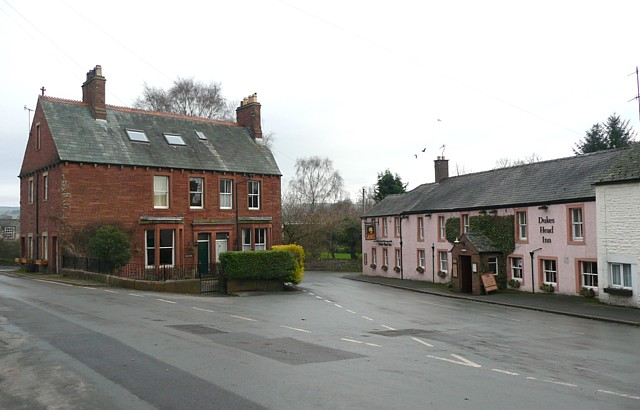
- The Duke's Head Inn in Armathwaite

- Location in former Eden district, Cumbria Location within Cumbria
- OS grid reference: NY505461
- Civil parish: Hesket
- Unitary authority: Westmorland and Furness
- Ceremonial county: Cumbria
- Region: North West
- Country: England
- Sovereign state: United Kingdom
- Post town: CARLISLE
- Postcode district: CA4
- Dialling code: 016974
- Police: Cumbria
- Fire: Cumbria
- Ambulance: North West
- UK Parliament: Penrith and Solway

Armathwaite is a village in the English ceremonial county of Cumbria.

Historically within the county of Cumberland, Armathwaite lies on the River Eden, forms part of the Westmorland and Furness district and is served by Armathwaite railway station. The majority of the village is in Hesket civil parish but with some buildings in the parish of Ainstable and others on the outskirts of the village located in the parish of Wetheral, within the Cumberland district. The castle on the west bank of the river was originally a pele tower with a large but undistinguished Edwardian extension.

The parish church of Christ and St Mary was formerly a chapel-of-ease in the parish of Hesket-in-the-Forest and is one of the smallest parish churches in England. By the 17th century the original chapel had become ruinous but it was rebuilt before 1688 by Richard Skelton of Armathwaite Castle. It consists of a chancel and nave with a wooden roof and a small western bell turret.

The town of Armathwaite in Fentress County, Tennessee was named by Alwyn Maude, who was from the Armathwaite area (then in Cumberland) and who arrived in Tennessee about 1881 and settled in the Rugby Colony. Richard Tomlinson (former spy) spent his childhood in Armathwaite.

An application to erect a wind turbine on a ridge to the south east of the village was considered by Eden District Council in 2014 and turned down. The application attracted 3 letters of support and 895 letters of objection. Another wind turbine application for nearby Aiketgate is being considered by the Harmony Energy Ltd. on land at Barrock End Farm.

Armathwaite Golf Club (now defunct) was founded in 1907. The club disappeared following WW1.

== See also ==
- Armathwaite Castle
- Armathwaite Nunnery
- Listed buildings in Ainstable
- Listed buildings in Hesket, Cumbria
- Low House Estate
