= Grade I listed buildings in Forest of Dean =

Gloucestershire shown in England

There are over 9,000 Grade I listed buildings in England. This page is a list of these buildings in the Forest of Dean in Gloucestershire.

== Forest of Dean ==
Name	Location	Type	Completed (Note: The date given is the date used by Historic England as significant for the initial building or that of an important part in the structure's description.)	Date designated	Grid ref. (Note: Sometimes known as OSGB36, the grid reference is based on the British national grid reference system used by the Ordnance Survey.) Geo-coordinates	Entry number (Note: The "List Entry Number" is a unique number assigned to each listed building and scheduled monument by Historic England.)	Image
Church of St Andrew	Awre, Forest of Dean	Church	13th century	23 September 1955	SO7088208050; 51°46′13″N 2°25′24″W	1186370	Church of St Andrew More images
Flaxley Abbey	Flaxley, Blaisdon, Forest of Dean	Abbey	Mid 12th century	23 September 1955	SO6901115405; 51°50′11″N 2°27′04″W	1299200	Flaxley Abbey More images
Church of St Michael	Bulley, Churcham, Forest of Dean	Church	12th century	23 September 1955	SO7617219755; 51°52′33″N 2°20′51″W	1078688	Church of St Michael More images
Church of St Margaret	Corse, Forest of Dean	Church	14th century	2 October 1954	SO7884026503; 51°56′12″N 2°18′33″W	1078562	Church of St Margaret More images
Church of St John the Baptist	Preston, Dymock, Forest of Dean	Church	Late 11th century	2 October 1954	SO6799334591; 52°00′32″N 2°28′04″W	1341946	Church of St John the Baptist More images
Church of St Mary	Dymock, Forest of Dean	Church	1927	2 October 1954	SO7004331230; 51°58′43″N 2°26′15″W	1303073	Church of St Mary More images
Church of St Mary the Virgin	English Bicknor, Forest of Dean	Church	12th century	12 December 1953	SO5812915812; 51°50′22″N 2°36′33″W	1289658	Church of St Mary the Virgin More images
Church of St Mary	Hartpury, Forest of Dean	Church	12th century	2 October 1954	SO7806323645; 51°54′39″N 2°19′13″W	1078669	Church of St Mary More images
Church of St John the Baptist	Huntley, Forest of Dean	Church	15th century	23 September 1955	SO7132819610; 51°52′28″N 2°25′04″W	1186476	Church of St John the Baptist More images
Church of St Mary	Kempley, Forest of Dean	Church	12th century	2 October 1954	SO6698731257; 51°58′44″N 2°28′55″W	1156244	Church of St Mary More images
Church of St Ethelbert	Littledean, Forest of Dean	Church	12th century	23 September 1955	SO6721713577; 51°49′11″N 2°28′37″W	1186482	Church of St Ethelbert More images
Church of St Mary	Lydney, Forest of Dean	Church	13th century	7 August 1954	SO6332002526; 51°43′13″N 2°31′57″W	1186600	Church of St Mary More images
Church of St Michael and All Angels	Mitcheldean, Forest of Dean	Church	1911	23 September 1955	SO6636618599; 51°51′54″N 2°29′23″W	1100286	Church of St Michael and All Angels More images
Church of St Mary	Newent, Forest of Dean	Church	C9	2 October 1954	SO7234825937; 51°55′53″N 2°24′13″W	1078649	Church of St Mary More images
Church of All Saints	Newland, Forest of Dean	Church	Early 13th century	12 December 1953	SO5527109525; 51°46′57″N 2°38′59″W	1212955	Church of All Saints More images
Church of St Peter, and two pairs of gate piers with gate	Newland, Forest of Dean	Church	1866	24 September 1984	SO5712807973; 51°46′08″N 2°37′22″W	1299251	Church of St Peter, and two pairs of gate piers with gate More images
Church of St John the Evangelist	Pauntley, Forest of Dean	Church	12th century	2 October 1954	SO7487628987; 51°57′32″N 2°22′01″W	1304746	Church of St John the Evangelist More images
Church of St Mary	Rudford, Rudford and Highleadon, Forest of Dean	Church	12th century	2 October 1954	SO7797521712; 51°53′37″N 2°19′17″W	1304684	Church of St Mary More images
Church of St Mary	St Briavels, Forest of Dean	Church	12th century	7 August 1954	SO5586204648; 51°44′20″N 2°38′26″W	1299118	Church of St Mary More images
St Briavels Castle and Curtain Wall	St. Briavels, Forest of Dean	Castle	Early 13th century	7 March 1988	SO5584804587; 51°44′18″N 2°38′27″W	1186632	St Briavels Castle and Curtain Wall More images
Church of All Saints	Staunton, Staunton Coleford, Forest of Dean	Church	Early 12th century	12 December 1953	SO5506912613; 51°48′37″N 2°39′11″W	1186351	Church of All Saints More images
Church of the Holy Trinity	Tibberton, Forest of Dean	Church	12th century	2 October 1954	SO7569521880; 51°53′42″N 2°21′17″W	1078582	Church of the Holy Trinity More images
Severn Bridge and Aust Viaduct, First Severn Crossing	Aust, Tidenham, Forest of Dean	Road Bridge	1961-1966	26 November 1999	ST5576190317; 51°36′36″N 2°38′25″W	1379827	Severn Bridge and Aust Viaduct, First Severn Crossing More images
Church of St Mary	Upleadon, Forest of Dean	Church	12th century	2 October 1954	SO7688426959; 51°56′26″N 2°20′16″W	1153374	Church of St Mary More images
Tower and Spire, Church of St Peter and St Paul	Westbury-on-Severn, Forest of Dean	Church	1710	4 July 1985	SO7171413918; 51°49′23″N 2°24′43″W	1299161	Tower and Spire, Church of St Peter and St Paul More images
