= Bibliography of the City of Gloucester =

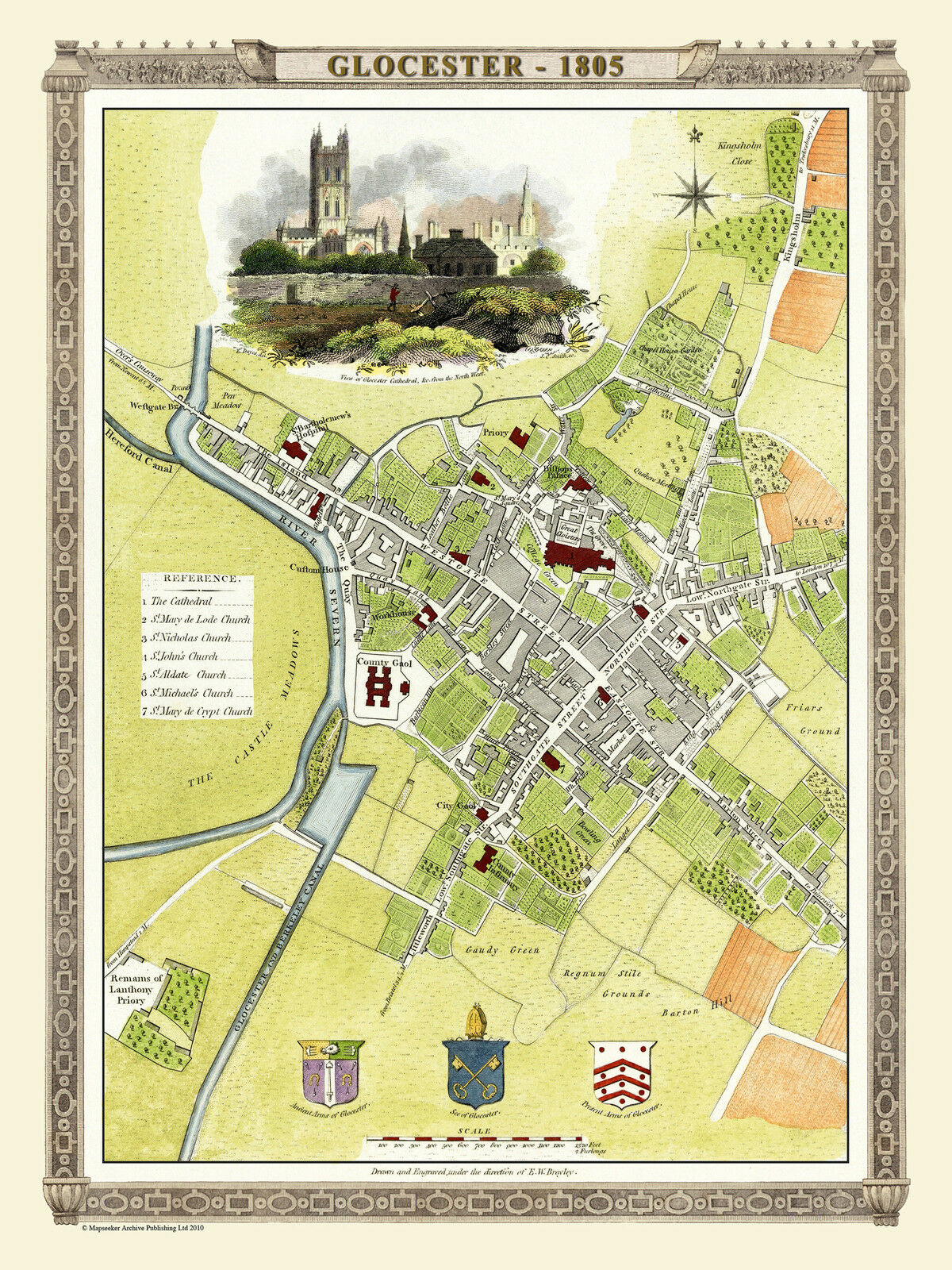
Map of Gloucester in 1805

This is a bibliography of the City of Gloucester in the south-west of England. The city lies close to the Welsh border, on the River Severn, between the Cotswolds to the east and the Forest of Dean to the southwest. It was founded by the Romans under Emperor Nerva as Colonia Glevum Nervensis, and was granted its first charter in 1155 by King Henry II.

This bibliography includes non-fiction works covering the history of the city from Roman times, its archaeology, ecclesiastical history, general history, economy, and the transport and aviation sectors. It includes works covering the county of Gloucestershire where those include significant content relating to the city.

Printed bibliographies of Gloucester include Francis Hyett and William Bazeley's The Bibliographer's Manual of Gloucestershire Literature, published in five volumes in 1846 by John Bellows of Gloucester and with later supplements.

== General history ==
- Atkyns, Robert. (1712) The Ancient and Present State of Glostershire. London.
- Bigland, Ralph. (1989-1995) Historical, Monumental, and Genealogical Collections relative to the County of Gloucester. 4 vols. Bristol: Bristol and Gloucestershire Archaeological Society. (originally published in instalments from 1791)
- Counsel, George Worrall. (1829) The History and Description of the City of Gloucester, From the Earliest Period to the Present Time, &c. Gloucester: J. Bulgin.
- Fosbroke, Thomas Dudley. (1819) An Original History of the City of Gloucester &c. London: John Nichols.
- Fullbrook-Leggatt, L. E. W. O. (1952) Anglo-Saxon and Medieval Gloucester. Gloucester: Jennings.
- Heighway, Carolyn. (1985) Gloucester: A History and Guide. Gloucester: Alan Sutton Publishing. ISBN 0862992567
- Gray, Irvine. (1981) Antiquaries of Gloucestershire and Bristol. Bristol: Bristol and Gloucestershire Archaeological Society. ISBN 0900197145
- Herbert N. M. et al. (1983) The 1483 Gloucester Charter in History. Gloucester: Alan Sutton. ISBN 0862990610 (Translation of the charter and four lectures)
- — Ed.) (1988) A History of the County of Gloucester: Volume 4, the City of Gloucester. London. (The Victoria County History)
- Hyett, Francis. (1906) Gloucester in National History. Gloucester: John Bellows, London: Kegan Paul & Co.
- Lysons, Samuel. (1803) A Collection of Gloucestershire Antiquities
- Rudder, Samuel. (1779) A New History of Gloucestershire. Cirencester.
- — (1781) The History and Antiquities of Gloucester.
- Rudge, Thomas. (1803) The History of the County of Gloucester, Compressed and Brought Down to the Year 1803, 2 vols., Gloucester.
- — (1807) A General View of the Agriculture of the County of Gloucester.
- — (1811) The History and Antiquities of Gloucester, From the Earliest Period to the Present Time: &c.
- Smith, Roger. (2019) A-Z of Gloucester: Places-People-History. Stroud: Amberley. ISBN 9781445691992
- Washbourne, J. (1825) Bibliotheca Gloucestrensis: A collection of scarce and curious tracts relating to the county and city of Gloucester. Gloucester.
- Waters, G. (1983) King Richard's Gloucester

== Illustrated ==
- Amphlett, D. G. (2015) Gloucester: History You Can See. The History Press. ISBN 9780752470177
- Elder, David. (2018) Historic England: Gloucester: Unique Images from the Archives of Historic England. Historic England series. Stroud: Amberley. ISBN 9781445683324
- Kirby, Darrel. (2012) Gloucester Then and Now. Stroud: The History Press. ISBN 9780752464763
- Jordan, Christine. (2015) Secret Gloucester. Amberley. ISBN 9781445646886
- — (2016) Gloucester in 50 Buildings. Amberley. ISBN 9781445652313
- Jurica, John. (1994) Gloucester: A Pictorial History. Chichester: Phillimore. ISBN 0850338360
- Moss, Philip. (2005) Historic Gloucester: An Illustrated Guide: An Illustrated Guide to the City and Its Buildings. Nonsuch Publishing. ISBN 9781845880774
- — & Derrick Hall. (2016) Gloucester From Old Photographs. Amberley. ISBN 9781445662206
- Sillence, Rebecca. (2009) Gloucester Through Time. Stroud: Amberley. ISBN 9781445604831
- Voyce, Jill. (1985) Gloucester in Old Photographs from the County Library Collection. Gloucester: Alan Sutton. ISBN 0862992583
- — (1989) Gloucester in Old Photographs from the Walwin Collection. Gloucester: Alan Sutton. ISBN 0862996848

== Archaeology ==
- Glevensis (1966 to date) Journal of the Gloucester and District Archaeological Research Group
- Hurst, H. "Gloucester Castle" in TBGAS, Vol. 102, pp. 73–128.
- — (1985) Kingsholm. (Gloucester Archaeological Reports, 1.) Gloucester: Gloucester Archaeological Publications.

== Architecture ==
- Clarke, John Randall. (c. 1850) The Architectural History of Gloucester: From the earliest period to the close of the eighteenth century.. Gloucester: T.R. Davies.
- Verey, David & Alan Brooks (2002) The Buildings of England Gloucestershire 2: The Vale and the Forest of Dean. New Haven & London: Yale University Press. 3rd edition. ISBN 9780300097337

== Areas ==
- Bullock, Donald. (2012) The Legend That Was Clapham: All Good Things... 2nd edition. Gloucester: Wheatley Press. ISBN 9780954195809
- Eley, Harold. (1996) Clapham Tales: A Boyhood Account of Life in Clapham, Gloucester, During the 1930s and 1940s. Pickton Press. ISBN 9780952936404

== Biographical ==
- Firth, Brian. (1972) Twelve Portraits of Gloucester Benefactors: On view at Bishop Hooper's Lodging. Gloucester: City Museums and Art Gallery. ISBN 0550312498
- Gray, Irvine. (1981) Antiquaries of Gloucestershire and Bristol. Bristol: Bristol and Gloucestershire Archaeological Society. ISBN 0900197145
- Ripley, Peter, & John Jurica (Ed.) (1991) A Calendar of the Registers of the Freemen of the City of Gloucester 1641-1838. Bristol and Gloucestershire Archaeological Society. ISBN 0900197323
- Stratford, Joseph. (1887) Gloucestershire Biographical Notes. Gloucester: Gloucester Journal.

== Crime ==
- Anon. (1792) Gloucester Bastile!!! Pathetic particulars of a poor boy sentenced to suffer seven years solitary confinement in Gloucester Gaol, etc. London: W. Holland.
- Evans, Jill. (2011) Hanged at Gloucester. The History Press. ISBN 9780752458182
- — A History of Gloucester Prison, 1791-1950. Newent: Glos Crime History Books. ISBN 9781545479841
- Whiting, J. R. S. (1975) Prison Reform in Gloucestershire, 1776-1820: A Study of the Work of Sir George Onesiphorus Paul, Bart. Phillimore. ISBN 0850332087

== Economy ==
- Ripley, P. (1976) "Trade and Social Structure of Gloucester, 1600-1640" in TBGAS, Vol. 94, pp. 117-123.
- — "The Economy of the City of Gloucester, 1660-1740" in TBGAS, Vol. 98, pp. 135-154.

== Gloucester Docks ==
- Conway-Jones, Hugh. (1984) Gloucester Docks: An illustrated history. Sutton & Gloucestershire County Library. ISBN 0862990858
- — (1988) A Guide to Gloucester Docks. Sutton. ISBN 086299487X
- Stimpson, Michael. (1980) The History of Gloucester Docks and its Associated Canals and Railways. Potters Bar: West London Industrial Archaeological Society. ISBN 0907220002

== Ecclesiastical ==
- Britton, John. (1829) The History and Antiquities of the Abbey, and Cathedral Church of Gloucester &c. London: Longman.
- Bryant, R. (1980) "The Church of St. Mary de Lode, Gloucester", Glevensis, Vol. 14, pp. 4-12.
- Heighway, Carolyn M. & Susan Hamilton (2011) Gloucester Cathedral – Faith, Art and Architecture: 1000 Years. Scala Books. ISBN 9781857596670
- Maddison, Lowinger. (2000) Gloucester Cathedral. The History Press. ISBN 9780853729624
- Page, William. (Ed.) (1907) A History of the County of Gloucester: Volume 2. London. (The Victoria County History) - covers the religious houses of Gloucestershire and the early history of Gloucester Cathedral.
- Welander, David. (1985) The Stained Glass of Gloucester Cathedral.
- - (1991) The History, Art, and Architecture of Gloucester Cathedral. Alan Sutton Publishing. ISBN 9780862998219

== English Civil War ==
- Atkin, Malcolm, & Wayne Laughlin. (1992) Gloucester and the Civil War: A city under siege. Alan Sutton. ISBN 0750901489
- Day, John. (2007) Gloucester & Newbury 1643: The Turning Point of the Civil War. Pen and Sword. ISBN 9781473814646
- Pereira, W. D. (1983) The Siege of Gloucester. Gloucester: Stoate and Bishop. ISBN 0901909130
- Whiting, J. R. S. (1975) Gloucester Besieged: The story of a roundhead city 1640-1660. Gloucester: City Museum & Art Gallery. (2nd edition 1984)

== Entertainment and sport ==
- King, Malc. (2016) Kingsholm: Castle Grim, Home of Gloucester Rugby, The Official History. HobNob Press. ISBN 9781906978396
- Kirby, Darrel. (2010) The Story of Gloucester's Pubs. Stroud: The History Press. ISBN 9780752455570
- Sandles, Geoff. (2013) Gloucester, Tewkesbury & Severn Vale pubs through time. Stroud: Amberley. ISBN 9781445604022

== Politics ==
- Hyett, F. A. & C. Wells (1929) "Members of Parliament for Gloucestershire and Bristol, 1900-29", Transactions of the Bristol and Gloucestershire Archaeological Society, Vol. 51, pp. 321-362.
- Stevenson W. H. (1893) Calendar of the Records of the Corporation of Gloucester. Gloucester: John Bellows.

== Roman Gloucester ==
- Copeland, Tim. (2011) Roman Gloucestershire. History Publishing Group. ISBN 9780752457833
- Fullbrook-Leggatt, L. E. W. O. (1946) Roman Gloucester-Glevum. Gloucester: John Bellows. (Revised edition 1968)
- Hurst, H. R. (1986) Gloucester: The Roman and later defences. Gloucester Archaeological Publications. ISBN 0948386010
- McWhirr, Alan. (1981) Roman Gloucestershire. Sutton Publishing. ISBN 0904387607

== Transport and aviation ==
- A History of the Gloucester Railway Carriage & Wagon Co. Weidenfeld and Nicolson, 1960.
- Bartlett, Steve. (2019) Gloucester Locomotive Sheds: Horton Road & Barnwood: Engine and Train Workings. Pen & Sword. ISBN 9781473875593
- James, Derek N. (1999) Gloster Aircraft Company. Stroud: Tempus.

== Journals ==
- Gloucestershire Notes and Queries (1879-1902)
- Transactions of the Bristol & Gloucestershire Archaeological Society (1876 to date)

== Maps ==
- Lobel, M. D. (Ed.) (1969) "Gloucester" in Historic Towns Atlas, Vol. I. London & Oxford: Lovell Johns-Cook, Hammond & Kell.
