= Irvine Gray =

English antiquarian & archivist (1903–1992)

Irvine Gray MBE FSA
- Born: 4 April 1903; London, England
- Died: 27 March 1992 (aged 88); Basingstoke, England
- Education: Ipswich School
- Occupation: Archivist
- Known for: Translating Le Petit Jehan de Saintré (1931); Antiquaries of Gloucestershire and Bristol (1981)

Irvine Egerton Gray MBE FSA (4 April 1903 – 27 March 1992) was an antiquarian and archivist of Gloucestershire. He served in the British Army during the Second World War, rising to the rank of major in the Intelligence Corps, and after the war worked as records officer for Gloucestershire County Council. A member of the Bristol and Gloucestershire Archaeological Society, he was the author and editor of a number of works on the history of Gloucestershire.

== Early life and family ==
Irvine Gray was born on 4 April 1903 in Earls Court, London, to Charles Herbert Gray, an insurance clerk, and his wife Ada Maude Oliver. He was educated at the private Ipswich School. Belgian official records show him in Antwerp sometime between 1916 and 1930.

He married Margaret M. Latto in London in 1935. The couple had three children, Faith (born 23 November 1937), Philippa (born 21 January 1940) and Oliver (born 7 September 1948).

== Career ==
In 1931, Gray produced a translation into English of Antoine de La Sale's Le Petit Jehan de Saintré under the title Little John of Saintré which was positively reviewed in History. In 1935, his history of the General Accident insurance company was published under the title Business Epic 1885–1935.

He served in the British Army during the Second World War, he was commissioned as a second lieutenant on 14 October 1939 rising to the rank of major in the Intelligence Corps, and was awarded the MBE in King George VI's 1945 Birthday Honours.

After the war, Gray was records officer for the Gloucestershire County Council and he began to write on the history of the county, producing a large number of articles and books, some edited, many of which were published by the Bristol and Gloucestershire Archaeological Society or printed in their journal. His first local history book was a guide to county records for the Historical Association (1948), jointly with Frederick Emmison. He followed that with a history of his alma mater, Ipswich School, written with William Potter and published in 1950.

In 1951, he gave an account of his work at the Gloucestershire Record Office in which he described records received into their care that dated back to the medieval period and had been saved from wartime paper "salvage" drives or found in bank vaults or attics. Five sacks of records, covering 700 years, were retrieved from a damp potting-shed and found to include medieval deeds, court rolls, and a grant from King Henry II of 1152–1154. Other books and articles followed, his final publication being his collation of the Antiquaries of Gloucestershire and Bristol in 1981 that gave biographical profiles of 52 antiquarians of that county from William Worcester (1414–1480s) to Roland Austin (1874–1954). He was a fellow of the Society of Antiquaries of London.

== Death ==
Gray died in Basingstoke, Hampshire, on 27 March 1992. His address at the time of his death was 24 Lloyd Square, London, WC1. He left an estate of less than £125,000.

== Selected publications ==
=== Books ===
- Little John of Saintré = Le Petit Jehan de Saintré, by Antoine de La Sale; translated for the first time into English with an introduction by Irvine Gray. London: G. Routledge & Sons, 1931. (Broadway Medieval Library series)
- A Business Epic 1885–1935. Perth and London: General Accident Fire and Life Assurance Corporation, [1935].
- County Records. London: George Philip & Son, for the Historical Association, 1948; revised eds., London: Historical Association, 1961 & 1967. (With Frederick George Emmison)
- Ipswich School, 1400–1950. Ipswich: W. E. Harrison & Sons, 1950. (With William Edward Potter)
- Hyett, Francis Adams. Glimpses of the History of Painswick ... A New Edition with a Foreword by W. I. Groome. Gloucester: British Publishing Co., 1957. (Editor)
- The Registers of the Church of St. Mary, Dymock, 1538–1790: baptisms and burials 1538–1788; marriages 1538–1790. Bristol: Bristol & Gloucestershire Archaeological Society, 1960. (Editor with John Eric Gethyn-Jones)
- Guide to the Parish Records of the City of Bristol and the County of Gloucester. Bristol: Bristol & Gloucestershire Archaeological Society, 1963. (Editor with Elizabeth Ralph)
- Cheltenham Settlement Examinations, 1815–1826. Bristol: Bristol & Gloucestershire Archaeological Society, 1969. (Editor)
- Antiquaries of Gloucestershire and Bristol. Bristol: Bristol and Gloucestershire Archaeological Society 1981. ISBN 0900197145

=== Articles ===
Transactions of the Bristol and Gloucestershire Archaeological Society:

- "Some Recent Discoveries in Local Records", Vol. 70 (1951), pp. 106–118.
- "Ralph Bigland and his Family", Vol. 75, pp. 116–133.
- "The Lysons Family", Vol. 81, pp. 212–213.
- "Some Early Records of Frocester", Vol. 82, pp. 143–147.
- "Some 17th-century Token-issuers", Vol. 84, pp. 101–109.
- "Gloucestershire Records: A Retrospect", Vol. 87, pp. 5–13.
- "The Sternhold Mystery", Vol. 87, pp. 209–212.
- "A Berkeley Ransom", Vol. 88, pp. 213–215.
- "Jemmy Wood's Journal", Vol. 90, pp. 158–177.
- "Shakespeare's Cousin, Thomas Greene", Vol. 92, pp. 213–215.
- "A Gloucestershire Postscript to the 'Domesday of Inclosures'", Vol. 97, pp. 75–80.
- "The Severn Bore", Vol. 97, pp. 123–126.
- "Records of four Tewkesbury Vicars, c. 1685–1769", Vol. 102, pp. 155–172.

Others:

- "The Making of Westbury Court Gardens", Occasional Paper, Garden History Society, No. 1 (1969), pp. 15–18.
