= Greenway Halt railway station =

Greenway Halt railway station may refer to:

- Greenway Halt railway station (Devon) - on the Dartmouth Steam Railway, opened 2012
- Greenway Halt railway station (Gloucestershire) - on the Ledbury and Gloucester Railway, closed 1959
