= Barbers Bridge railway station =

Former railway station in Gloucestershire, England

Coordinates: 51.89776°N 2.33204°W

Barber's Bridge
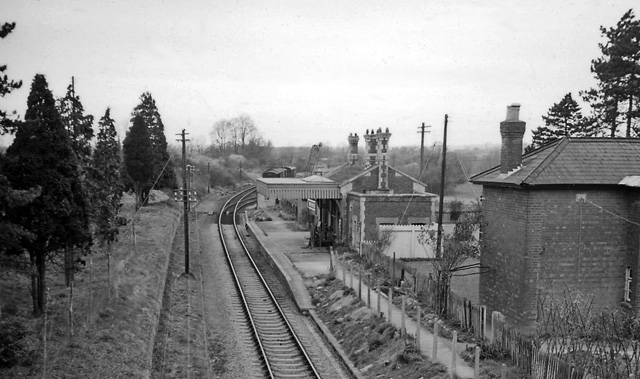
- Barbers Bridge railway station in 1961

General information
- Location: Rudford, Forest of Dean; England
- Grid reference: SO771222
- Platforms: 1

Other information
- Status: Disused

History
- Original company: Newent Railway
- Pre-grouping: Great Western Railway
- Post-grouping: GWR

Key dates
- 27 July 1885: Opened
- 13 July 1959: Closed
- 1964: completely closed
Location

Barbers Bridge railway station was on the Ledbury and Gloucester Railway in Gloucestershire, England. It was opened on 27 July 1885 and it closed to passengers on 13 July 1959, and then fully closed in 1964.

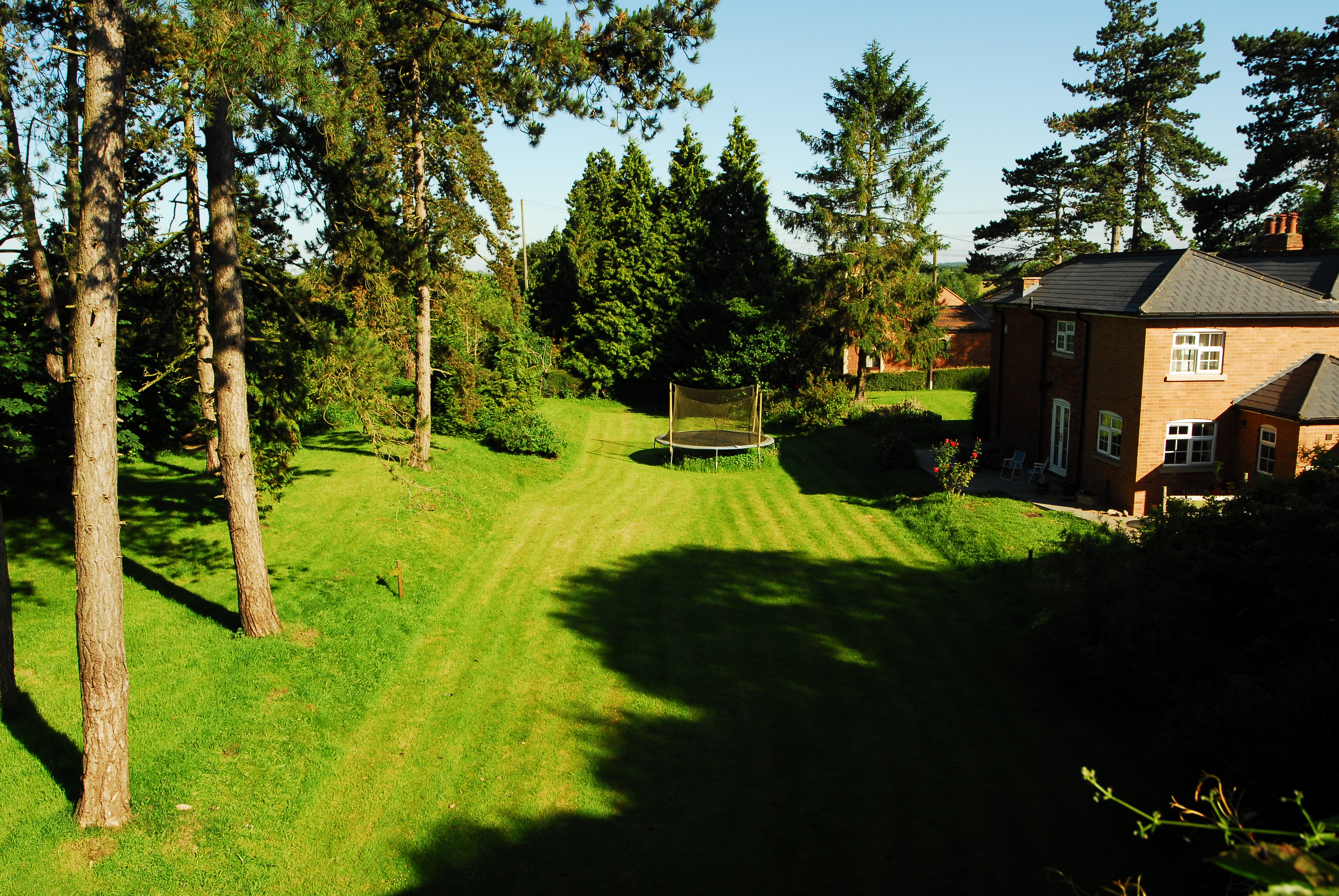
The old station site at Barbers Bridge. The station building is just about visible beyond the pine tree in the centre of the shot: Lots of the trees are recognisable from the 1961 picture.

The station was located just to the east of Tibberton village, on the west side of the B4215 road.

Preceding station	Disused railways	Following station
Gloucester	Great Western Railway; Ledbury and Gloucester Railway	Malswick Halt
