= Hereford Road Skew Bridge =

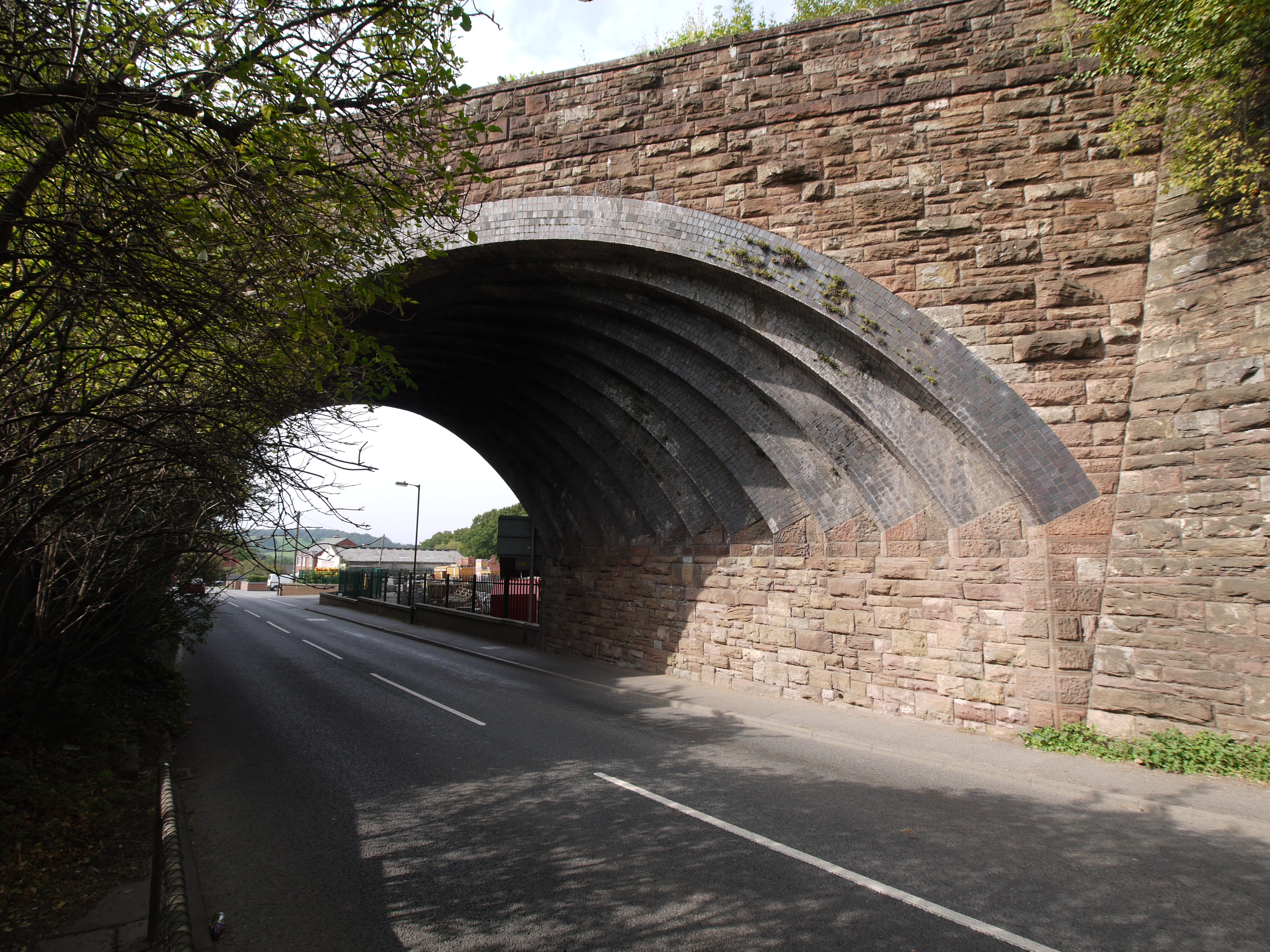
- East face of Hereford Road Skew Bridge showing the stepped nature of its intrados
- Coordinates: 52.0450°N 2.4286°W
- Carries: Ledbury Town Trail
- Crosses: A438, Hereford Road
- Locale: Ledbury, Herefordshire
- Maintained by: Herefordshire Council

Characteristics
- Design: Ribbed skew arch
- Material: Stone, brick
- No. of spans: 1

History
- Construction end: 1881
- Opened: 1885

Location
- Interactive map of Hereford Road Skew Bridge

Hereford Road Skew Bridge is a disused railway bridge in Ledbury, Herefordshire. Built in 1881 to carry the Ledbury and Gloucester Railway across the Hereford Road at an angle of approximately 45°, it was built as a ribbed skew arch with stone spandrels and wing walls, and ribs of blue brick. The railway line was closed in 1959 and the bridge is now used as part of the Ledbury Town Trail footpath.

== History ==
The Herefordshire and Gloucestershire Canal opened in two phases in 1798 and 1845, but in 1863, after a period of financial difficulty, it was leased to the Great Western Railway and in 1881 work started on converting the southern section into a railway. The Ross and Ledbury Railway Company's intention was to build a line between Ledbury and Ross-on-Wye via Dymock, where the Newent Railway Company planned a junction and a line that would link to the Great Western Railway at Over Junction, west of Gloucester. In 1873, both companies received acts of Parliament giving them powers to build, but due to financial difficulties building was delayed for two years, by which time the Ross and Ledbury Railway had abandoned its plan to reach Ross and linked with the Newent Railway head-on to provide a through route from Ledbury to Gloucester.

The line opened to traffic on 27 July 1885, when the existing Ledbury station was renamed Ledbury Junction, the Ledbury and Gloucester line curving away from the Worcester and Hereford Railway line on an embankment immediately west of the station. Just south of the junction the double-track line was carried at an awkward angle of approximately 45° over the Hereford Road, now part of the A438, by an arch bridge of "unusual design".

The two smaller companies were amalgamated into the Great Western Railway by the Great Western Railway Act 1892 (55 & 56 Vict. c. ccxxxiii), and on 4 January 1917 the double track between Ledbury and Dymock was singled to provide materials for the Great War. The line closed to passenger traffic on 11 July 1959, with the section between Ledbury and Dymock closing completely and Ledbury Junction station reverting to its old name, while the southern section remained open to freight traffic until 30 May 1964. Many bridges along the closed line were dismantled and in some cases just the abutments remain, but Hereford Road bridge remains intact and is currently in use as part of the Ledbury Town Trail footpath, with a nearby information board making the following extravagant claim:

The Skew Bridge over the Hereford Road is probably one of the most 'skew' railway bridges in the country although the 'skew' canal bridge at Monkhide is believed to be the most angled bridge in the country. It is quite a feat of engineering and the brickwork is well worth a look from the road below.

The skew canal bridge to which reference is made is still in place at Monkhide, carrying a minor road over one of the few remaining stretches of the old canal. However, now that the railway has been dismantled the canal has become the subject of an active and ambitious restoration scheme.

== Design and architecture ==
The oblique bridge was built in 1881 and constructed with stone abutments, parapet walls, spandrels and wing walls but to accommodate the skew it was built with 13 separate staggered but overlapping ribs in blue brick. Photographs show that each rib forms a separate segmental right arch equal in width to three stretcher bricks (each nominally 9 inches (230 mm) long), and offset from each of its neighbours by the width of six header bricks (each nominally 4 1/2 inches (110 mm) wide), thus providing as a whole for a skew angle of approximately 45°. This method of construction was first proposed by British-born American architect Benjamin Henry Latrobe in 1802 and later championed by French civil engineer A. Boucher, and has the advantage of being one of the simpler ways of building a skew arch, but set against that it has received considerable criticism for being "weak, ugly and wasteful of materials". The bridge is relatively unadorned and devoid of fussy detail. The smooth blue brick ribs contrast with the rusticated pink sandstone and the east parapet wall carries a plain date stone to mark 1881 as the year of construction.

== Gallery ==
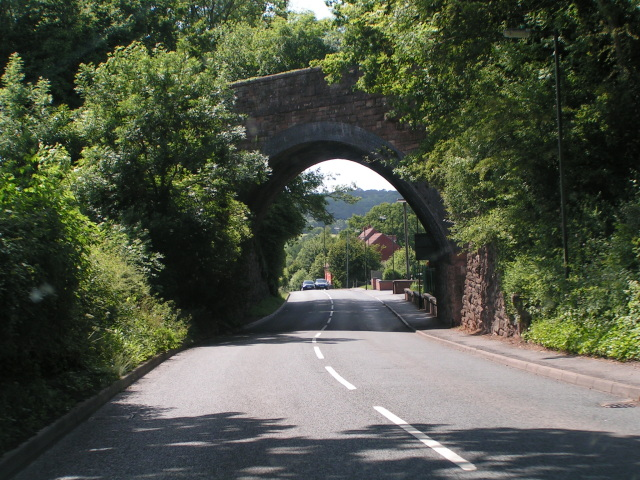
Hereford Road bridge from Hereford Road.

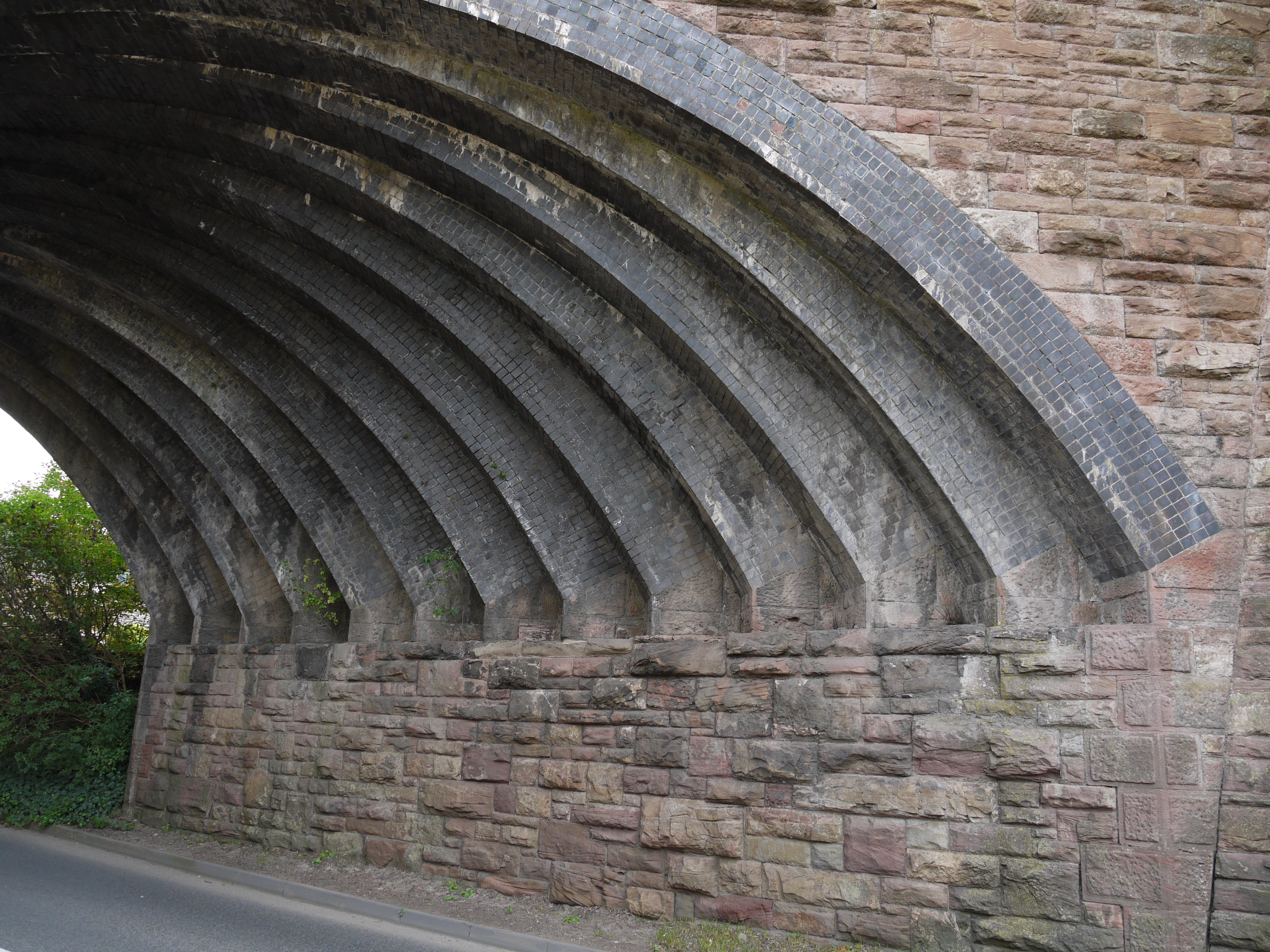
The 13 ribs making up the barrel of the arch.

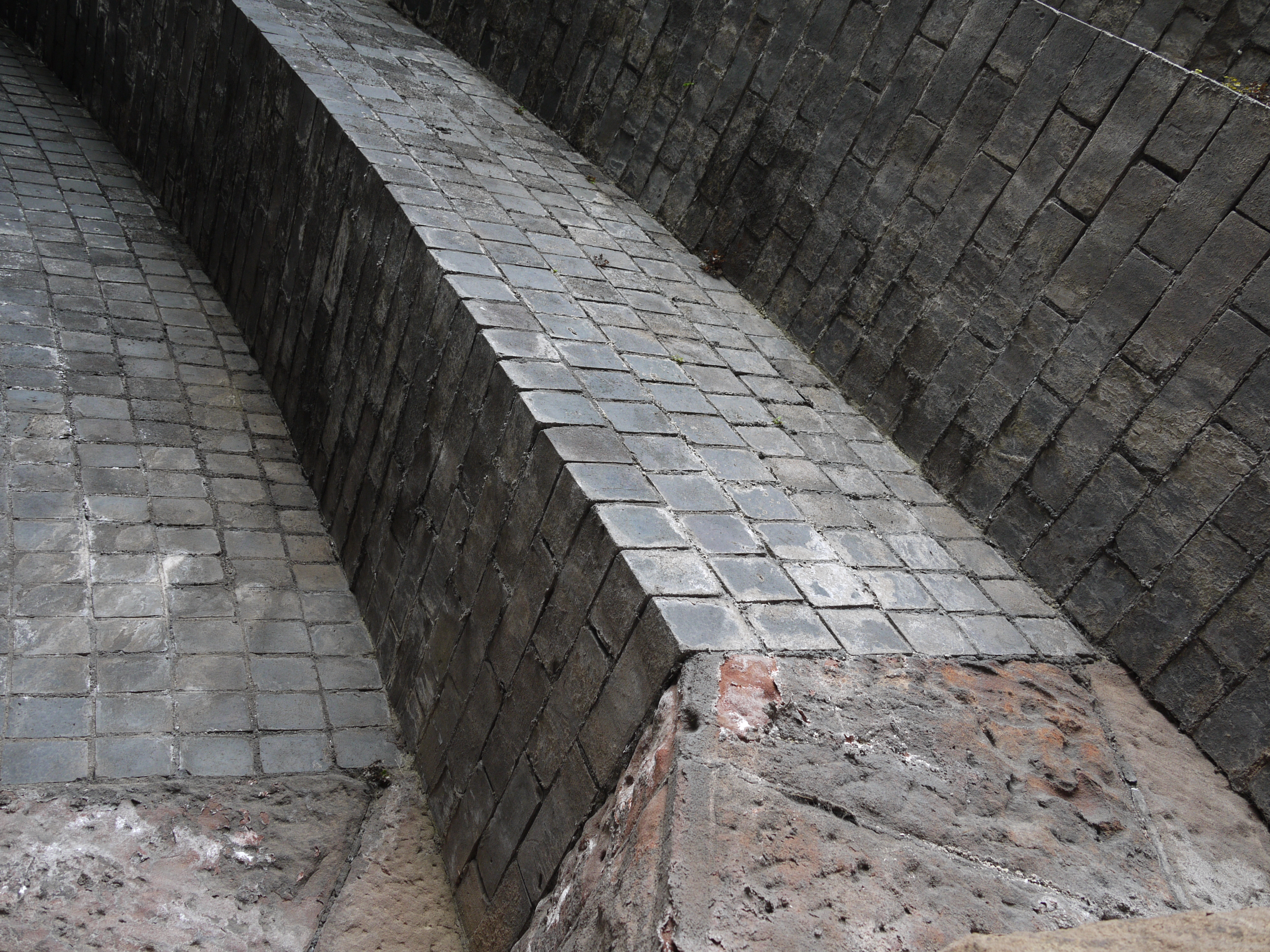
Rib detail.

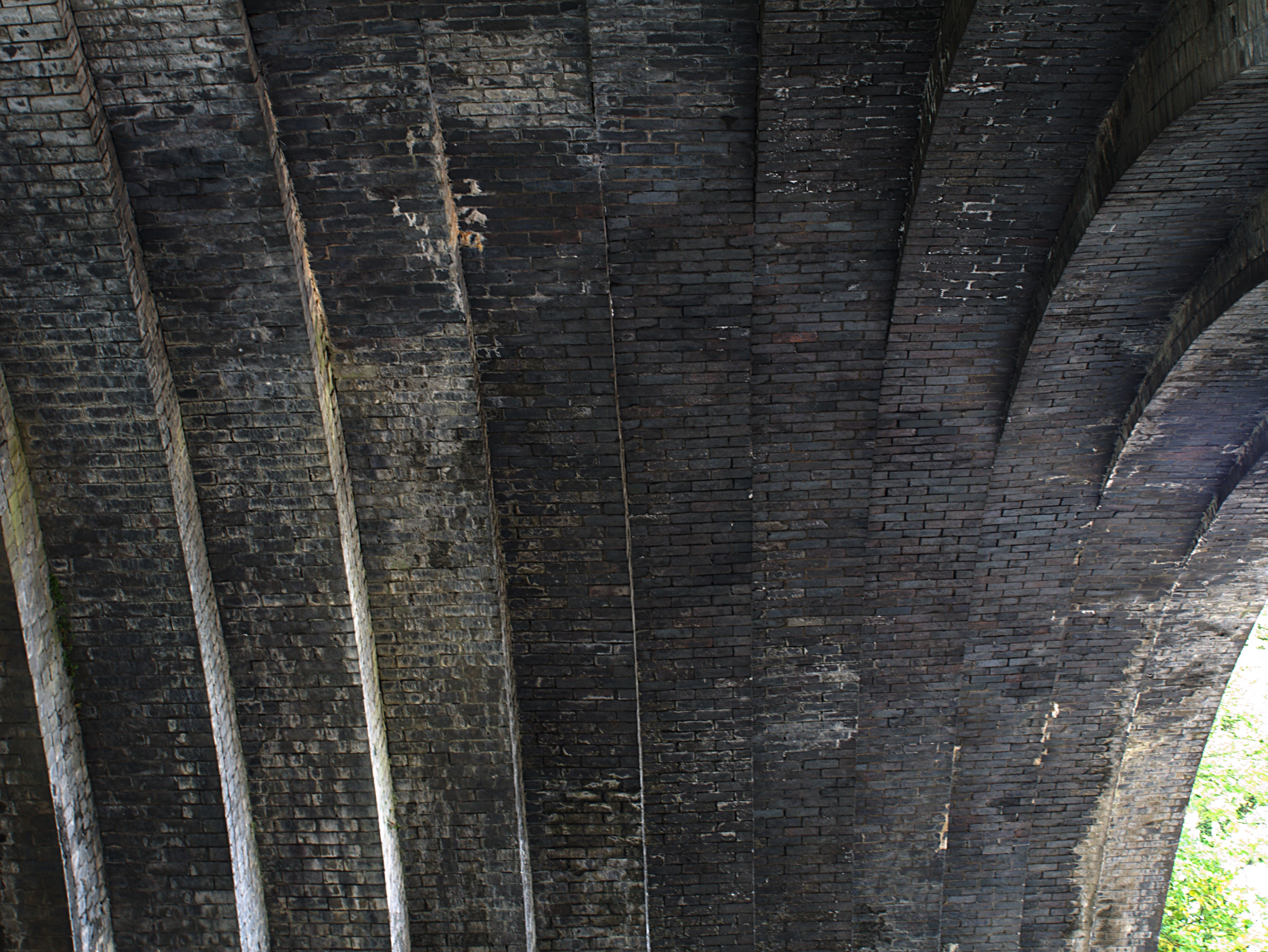
Looking up towards the crown of the arch from the road.

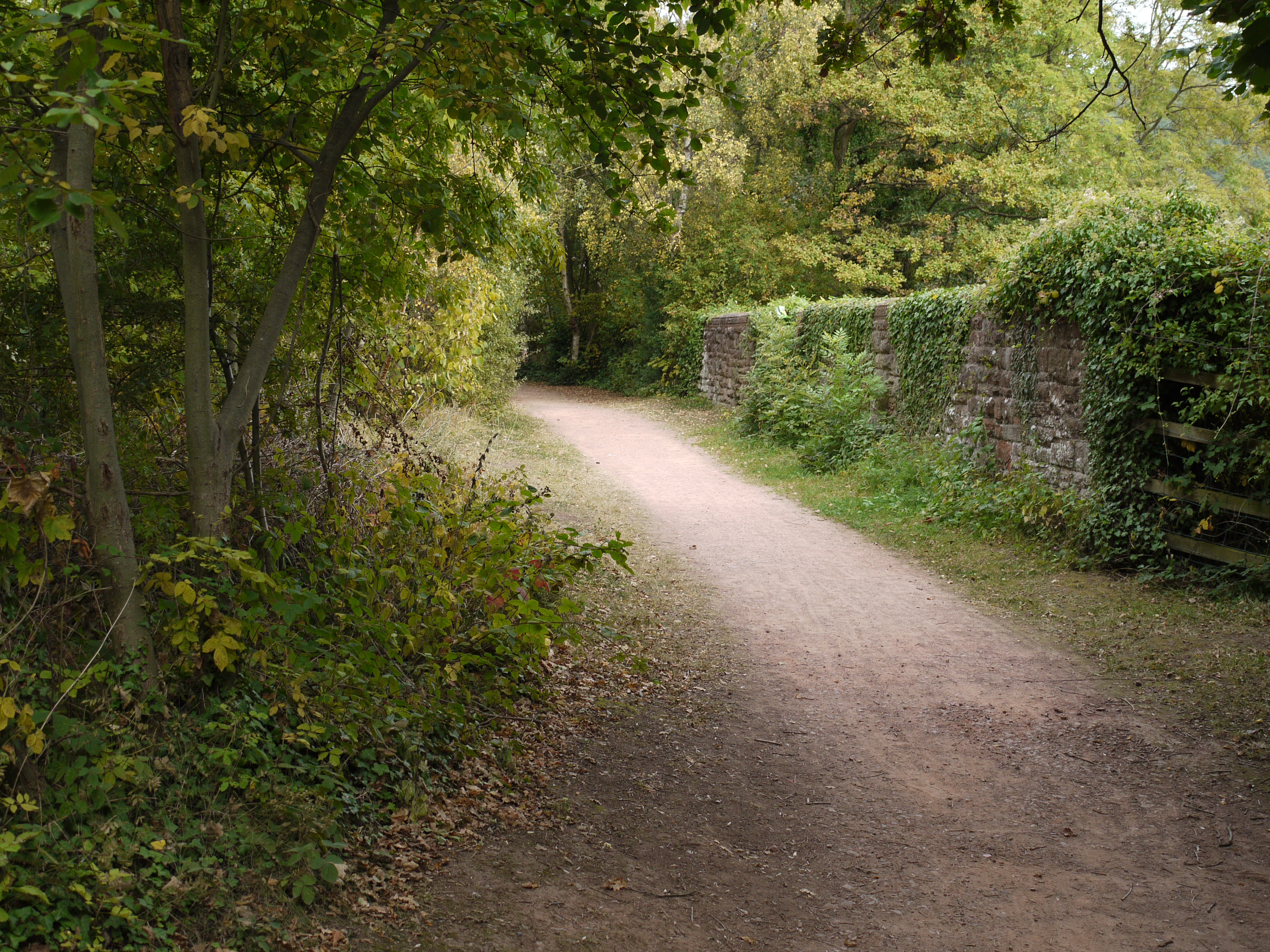
View from the footpath across the bridge, looking north-east.

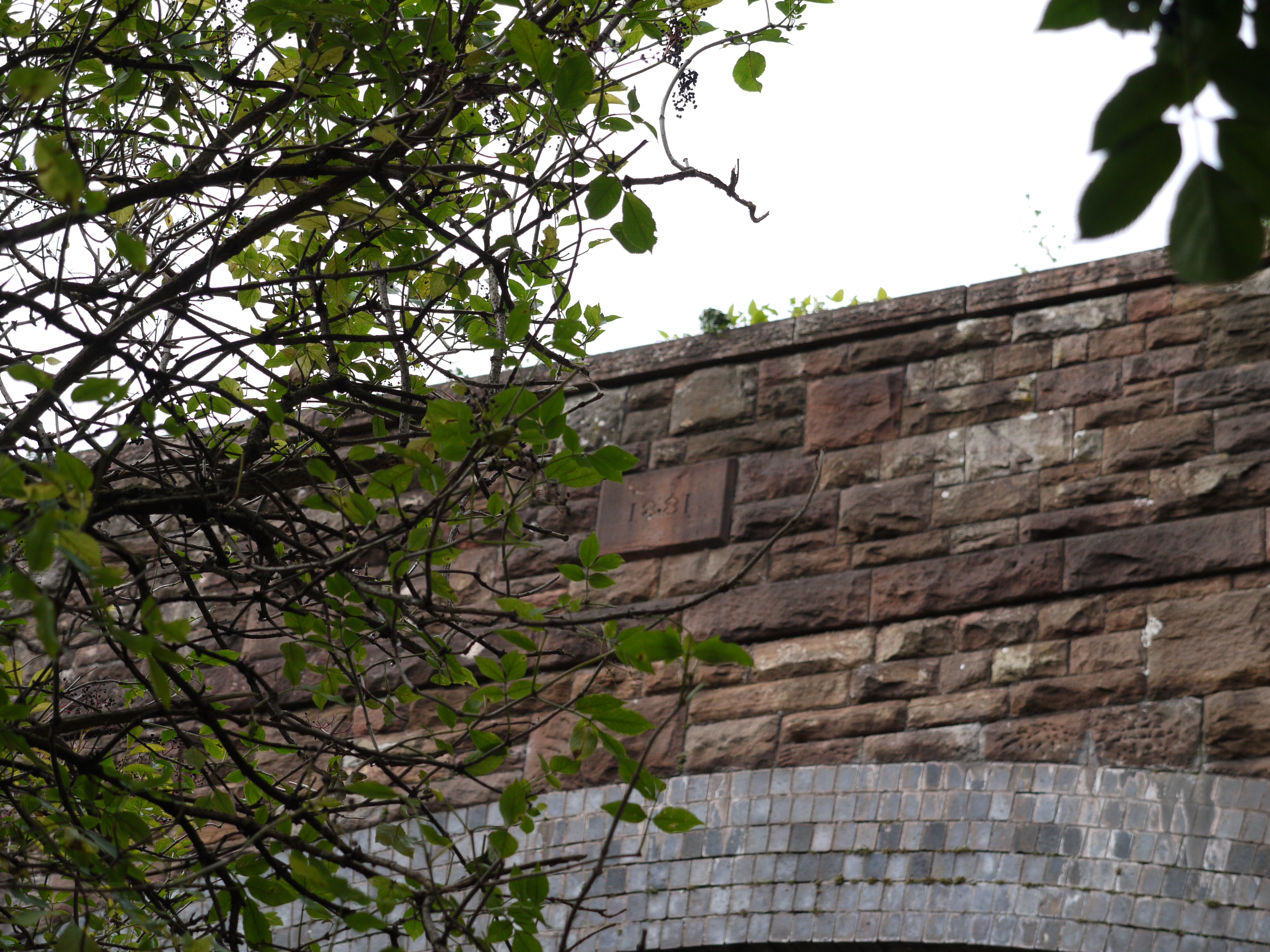
The east parapet wall from the road, showing the year of construction, 1881.

== See also ==
- Southdown Road Skew Bridge – a brick ribbed skew arch of even greater obliquity.
- Skew arch – a discussion of ribbed and other forms of skew bridge.

== Notes ==
1. A segmental arch is one whose barrel is made from a segment of a circle that is smaller than a semicircle. A right arch is a regular or unskewed arch, in which the faces are perpendicular to the abutments.
2. Bricks laid end to end are called stretchers. Bricks laid side by side are called headers. A course is a layer of bricks and when all the courses consist of stretchers the wall produced is said to use the stretcher bond, which results in a half-brick offset between courses for strength. There appears to be no bonding between the wythes, or concentric rings that make up each rib and there is little opportunity for any bonding between ribs, except at the crown, where close examination of the photographs shows a single brick spanning the junction between each pair of adjacent ribs.
3. Imperial size bricks are nominally 9 inches long, and of such a width that two headers plus the intervening layer of mortar occupy the same space along a course as a single stretcher. The ribs that make up the arch are therefore nominally square in section. Therefore, if a denotes the amount of offset between adjacent ribs and b denotes the width of a rib, then the angle of skew, θ = tan^{−1} (a / b) = tan^{−1} 1 = 45°.
