= Eric Gethyn-Jones =

British clergyman & historian (1909–1995)

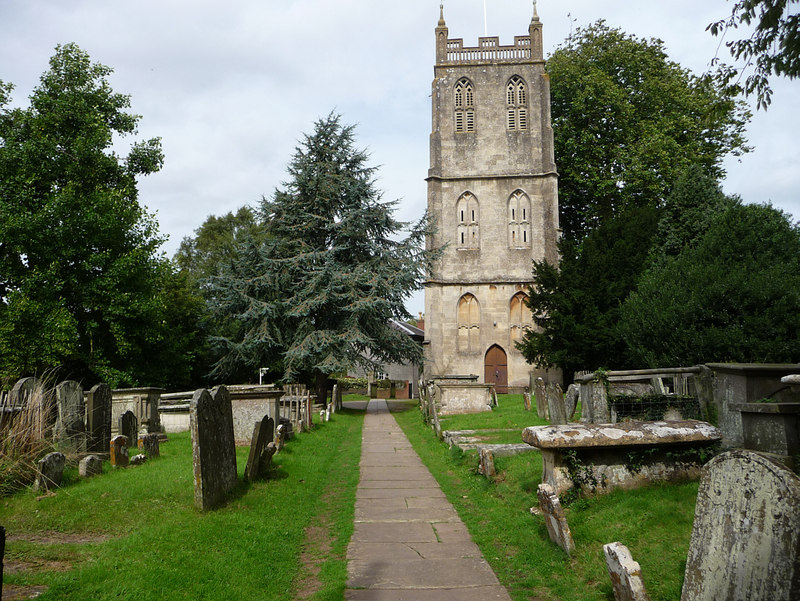
St Mary of the Virgin's Church, Berkeley (The Tower) of which Gethyn-Jones was vicar.

Canon John Eric Gethyn-Jones MBE FSA (9 October 1909 – 9 November 1995) was a clergyman and historian of Gloucestershire. He served in the Royal Army Chaplains' Department during the Second World War for which he was awarded the MBE in 1945. Later he was vicar of St Mary of the Virgin's Church, Berkeley, and rose to the position of Canon. He wrote a number of works including books on the history of Dymock and Berkeley, Gloucestershire.

== Early life ==
John Eric Gethyn-Jones was born on 9 October 1909 in Wales. His father, Daniel Gethyn-Jones was a man of the cloth and his mother, Edith Gethyn-Jones (née James), the daughter of a vicar. He attended The Crypt School, Gloucester, and went on to study at the University of Oxford (Pembroke College, Oxford) and Queen's College, Birmingham. His thesis on English Romanesque sculpture was submitted to the University of Bristol in the 1940s. He joined the Territorial Army, now called Army Reserve (United Kingdom), in 1937 and was awarded the Territorial Decoration, a military medal for long service. In 1960 he was appointed Assistant Chaplain General of the Territorial Army and honorary Chaplain to the Queen.

== Career ==
Gethyn-Jones was ordained a priest in 1935 and eventually succeeded his father as vicar of St Mary's Church, Dymock, in 1955. He remained its incumbent until 1967.

During the Second World War he served in the Royal Army Chaplains' Department and was awarded the MBE in 1945 for bravery in Normandy having been involved with the rescue of wounded soldiers on the ill-fated ship MV Derrycunihy (1943) in 1944.

From 1967 to 1977 he was vicar of St Mary of the Virgin's Church, Berkeley.

Amongst other publications he wrote a number of works on the history of Berkeley and Dymock, both in Gloucestershire. A long-standing member of the Bristol and Gloucestershire Archaeological Society he was elected a Fellow of the Society of Antiquaries of London in 1961.

== Other ==
Dymock is renowned for the Dymock poets, one of whom was the American poet Robert Frost. The Reverend Gethyn-Jones wrote about these poets in his first publication and in 1957 he was approached by the American Embassy with a request to escort Robert Frost, on a visit to receive an honorary degree from the University of Oxford, around the area in which he resided during a brief spell in England from 1912 to 1915.

As vicar of Berkeley he resided in The Chantry, the former home of Edward Jenner, pioneer of the smallpox vaccination. It was always the wish of Reverend Gethyn-Jones that a smaller vicarage could be built so the house could be turned into a museum to honour Jenner and he was a founder member of The Jenner Trust in 1966. Following a visit to The Chantry by two Japanese immunologists, the Trust later received a large cheque from the Japanese business Ryōichi Sasakawa. The Chantry was purchased from the Church of England in 1985 and is now a museum known as Dr. Jenner's House.

Photographs contributed by Reverend John Eric Gethyn-Jones to the Conway Library are currently being digitised by the Courtauld Institute of Art, as part of the Courtauld Connects project.

== Death ==
Gethyn-Jones died in Leicester on 9 November 1995. His correspondence, notes, slides and books were donated to the County Record Office, the Gloucester Collection, the B.G.A.S. Library, the Gloucester Regimental Museum and the Jenner Museum.

== Selected publications ==
- Dymock a Royal Manor. History of the Church and Parish. H. Osborne, Gloucester, [1950]. Dymock Down the Ages Revised edition Dymock, [1966]
- The Registers of the Church of St. Mary, Dymock, 1538–1790. Baptisms and burials 1538–1788; marriages 1538–1790. Bristol & Gloucestershire Archaeological Society, Bristol, 1960. (Editor with Irvine Gray)
- St. Mary's Church, Kempley, and its paintings. John Bellows, Gloucester, 1961.
- Dymock, Gloucestershire. J. E. Gethyn-Jones Dymock, [1965]. (later editions)
- Berkeley, Gloucestershire. Berkeley The Chantry, 1971. ISBN 095013791X
- Trevisa of Berkeley: A Celtic Firebrand. Alan Sutton, Dursley, 1978. ISBN 0904387208
- The Dymock School of Sculpture. Phillimore, London, 1979. ISBN 085033313X
- George Thorpe and the Berkeley Company: A Gloucestershire Enterprise in Virginia. Sutton, Gloucester, 1982. ISBN 0904387836
- A Territorial Army Chaplain in Peace and War: A Country Cleric in Khaki, 1938–1961. Gooday, Chichester, 1988. ISBN 1870568206
