= Newent railway station =

Former railway station in Gloucestershire, England

Newent
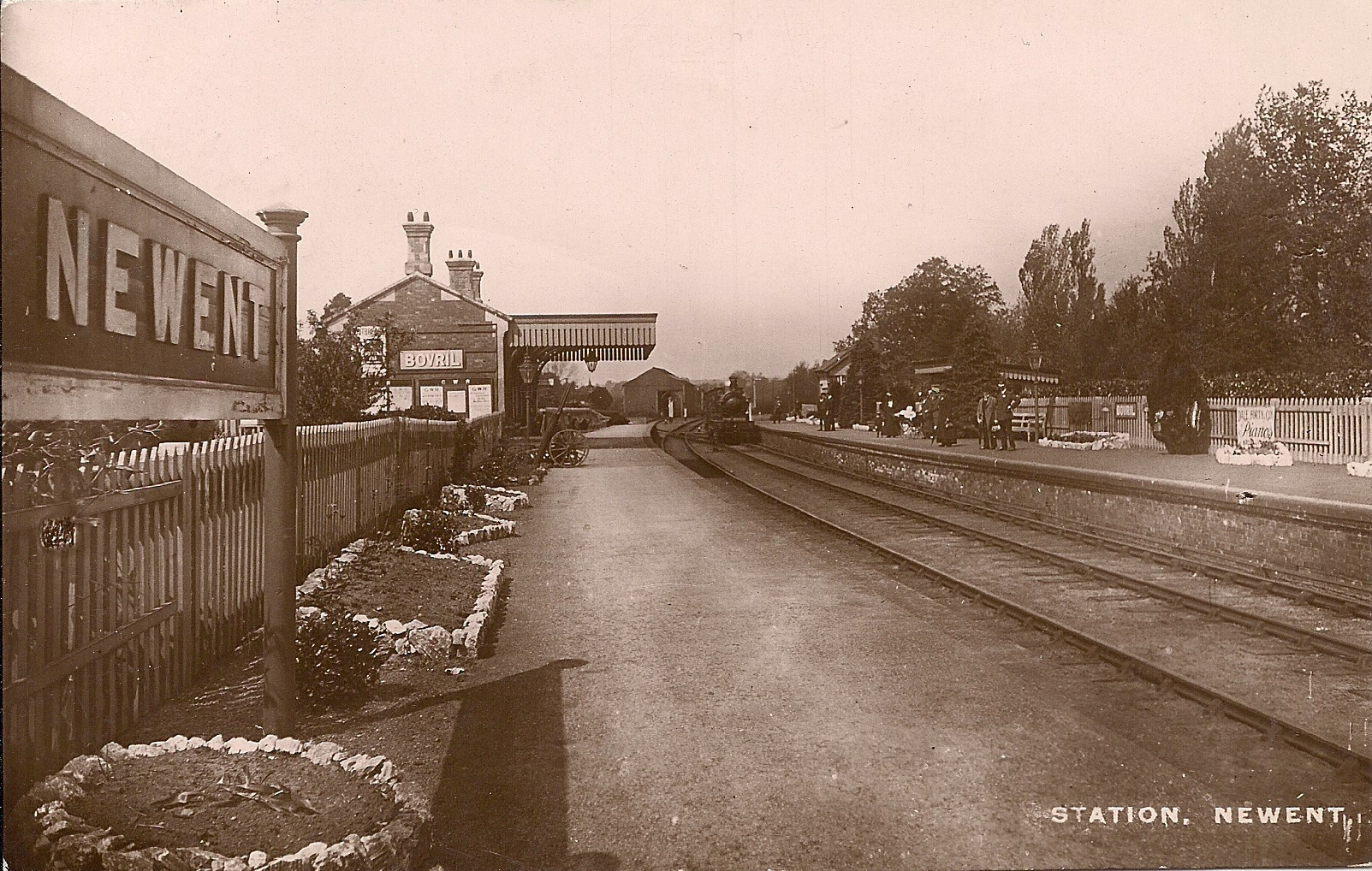

General information
- Location: Newent, Forest of Dean; England
- Coordinates: 51.9349°N 2.4080°W
- Grid reference: SO719263
- Platforms: 2

Other information
- Status: Disused

History
- Original company: Newent Railway
- Pre-grouping: Great Western Railway
- Post-grouping: Great Western Railway

Key dates
- 27 July 1885: Opened
- 13 July 1959: Closed to passengers
- 1964: Closed to all traffic
Location

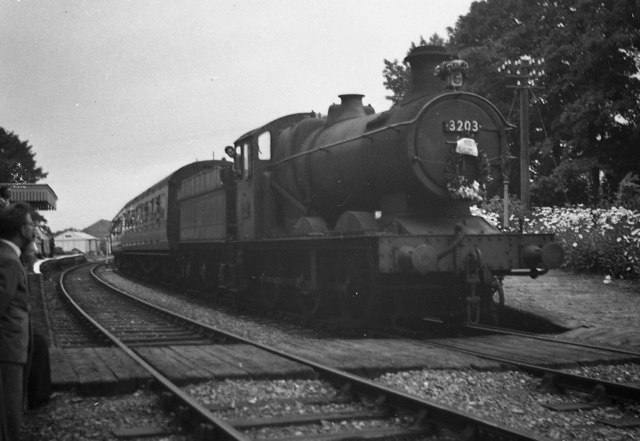
GWR 2251 Class 3203 hauling the last passenger train at Newent in 1959

Newent railway station served the town of Newent in Gloucestershire, England.

It opened on 27 July 1885 when the Newent Railway and the Ross and Ledbury Railway (with whom the Newent Railway had an end on connection at Dymock) opened their lines making a connection between Ledbury and Over Junction on the Gloucester and Dean Forest Railway.

The station had two platforms on a passing loop, a goods shed to the west and several sidings, one of which was equipped with a 5 ton crane. The goods yard was able to accommodate live stock and a full range of goods.

The station was host to a GWR camp coach in 1935, 1938 and 1939.

The station closed for passengers on 13 July 1959, but the line remained open for freight traffic until 1964. It was located opposite what is now the Newent fire station. The buttresses of the Station Bridge can be seen intact on nearby Station Road.

As of 2011 there was a proposal by the Herefordshire and Gloucestershire Canal Trust to reopen the 34 mile Herefordshire and Gloucestershire Canal upon which the railway was built.

Preceding station	Disused railways	Following station
Malswick Halt	Ledbury and Gloucester Railway; Great Western Railway	Four Oaks Halt

== Bibliography ==
- Fenton, Mike (1999). Camp Coach Holidays on the G.W.R. Wild Swan. ISBN 1-874103-53-4.
- Grant, Donald J. (2017). Directory of the Railway Companies of Great Britain (1st ed.). Kibworth Beauchamp, Leicestershire: Troubador Publishing Ltd. ISBN 978-1-78803-768-6.
- McRae, Andrew (1997). British Railway Camping Coach Holidays: The 1930s & British Railways (London Midland Region). Vol. Scenes from the Past: 30 (Part One). Foxline. ISBN 1-870119-48-7.
- Parkhouse, Neil (2013a). "3. The Ledbury Branch". West Gloucester & Wye Valley Lines. British Railway History In Colour. Vol. 1. Lydney: Lightmoor Press. pp. 49–56. ISBN 9781899889 76 1.
- Quick, Michael (2022) [2001]. Railway passenger stations in Great Britain: a chronology (PDF). version 5.04. Railway & Canal Historical Society. Archived from the original (PDF) on 25 November 2022.
- The Railway Clearing House (1970) [1904]. The Railway Clearing House Handbook of Railway Stations 1904 (1970 D&C Reprint ed.). Newton Abbot: David & Charles Reprints. ISBN 0-7153-5120-6.
