= St Edward's Church, Kempley =

Church of St Edward the Confessor
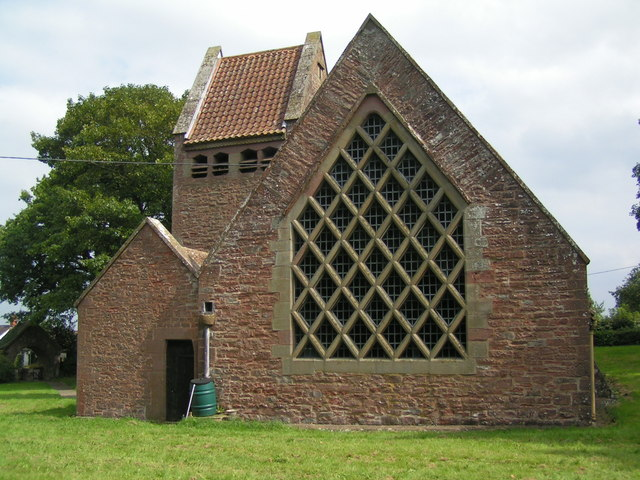
- Church of St Edward the Confessor
- 51°57′50″N 2°28′47″W
- Country: England
- Denomination: Church of England
- Churchmanship: Broad Church

History
- Status: Active

Architecture
- Functional status: Parish church
- Heritage designation: Grade II* listed

Administration
- Diocese: Diocese of Gloucester
- Archdeaconry: Archdeaconry of Cheltenham
- Deanery: North Cotswold
- Parish: Kempley

The Church of St Edward the Confessor in Kempley is a Church of England parish church in the Forest of Dean district of Gloucestershire, England, close to the border with Herefordshire.

== History ==
The church was built to the design of Randall Wells (1903-4) and is Grade II* listed. St Edward's was described by John Betjeman as "a mini-cathedral of the Arts and Crafts movement".

The church, dedicated to Edward the Confessor, was built as a chapel of ease by the Lord of the Manor and major landowner, William Lygon, 7th Earl Beauchamp, because St Mary's Church, Kempley was too far away from the main centres of population in the parish and liable to flooding. St Edward's became the parish church in 1975 following the redundancy of St Mary's.

Wells had acted as William Lethaby's resident architect at All Saints' Church, Brockhampton-by-Ross, (1901–02) where Lethaby's experimentation with the employment of direct labour under a site architect instead of a contractor under a formal building contract, and deliberately produced few drawings, gave Wells freedom to evolve the design as the building rose and to engage in the physical activity of building.

Some of the foundations had already been put in before Wells was asked to design a church to fit upon them as nearly as possible, fulfilling requirements of Lord Beauchamp that there should be no east window, that most of the lighting should be from the west end and that the eaves should be kept low.

The small village of Kempley has two notable Anglican churches, the other, older, is dedicated to St Mary and is Grade I.

== Exterior ==
The church was built from local materials by local labour. The red sandstone used was from the Forest of Dean quarries, about seven miles distant. The roof timbers were of unseasoned oak, cut on the Beauchamp estate. The church was roofed with local stone slates which remain on the lych gate; the church now has pantiles.

== Interior ==
The church has three sculpted stone reliefs designed by Wells: above the entrance Christ carved by Wells and a local carpenter Walter James; within the porch, a Virgin and Child by Laurence Turner; and on the East wall, the Crucifixion, again by James.

The rood, carved by David Gibb, originally from Glasgow and said to have been the last ship's figurehead carver in London, was painted by Wells and his brother Linley, through whom Wells had obtained the commission. The seating, the prayer desk, the rails and the altar were designed by the architect and made in English oak by Peter Waals at the Daneway Workshop, Sapperton, during the partnership of Ernest Gimson and Ernest Barnsley. The lectern was designed by Barnsley, the candelabra and a pair of iron candlesticks were made by Alfred Bucknell, supplied by Gimson, with other ironwork by the Kempley village blacksmith, George Smallman.

The parochial church council launched an appeal in March 2011 to raise £110,000 for repairs.

== Gallery ==
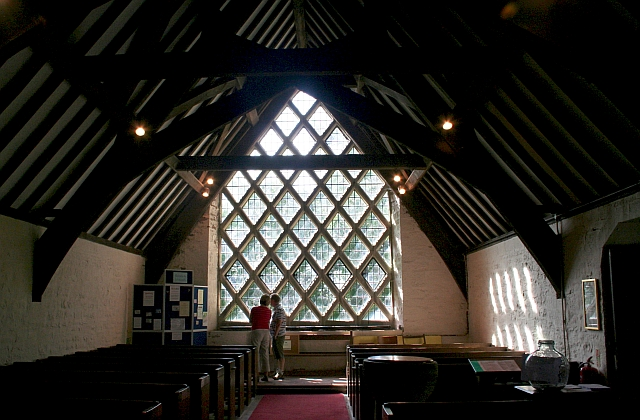
West window

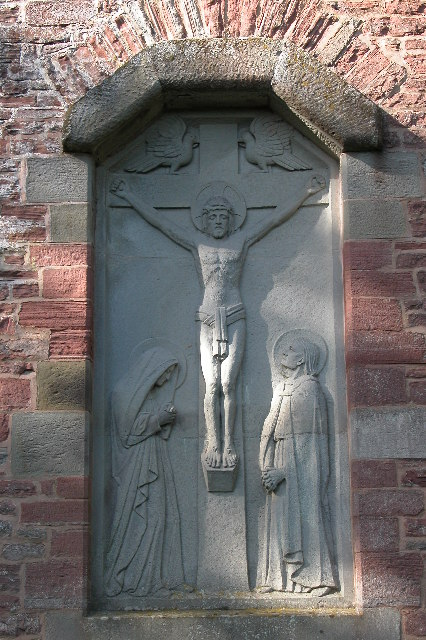
Crucifixion relief on the east wall

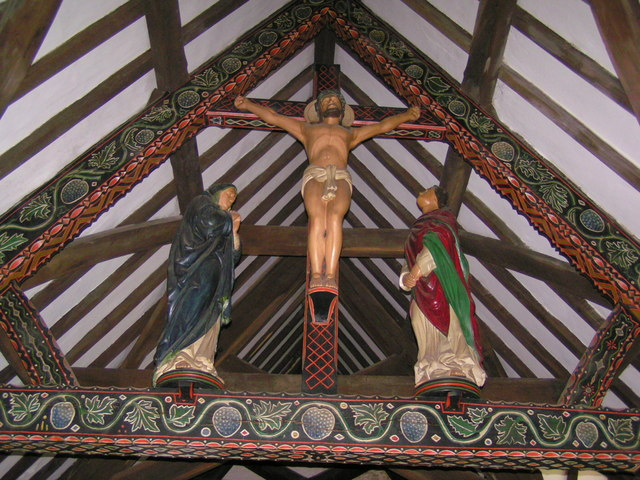
The rood

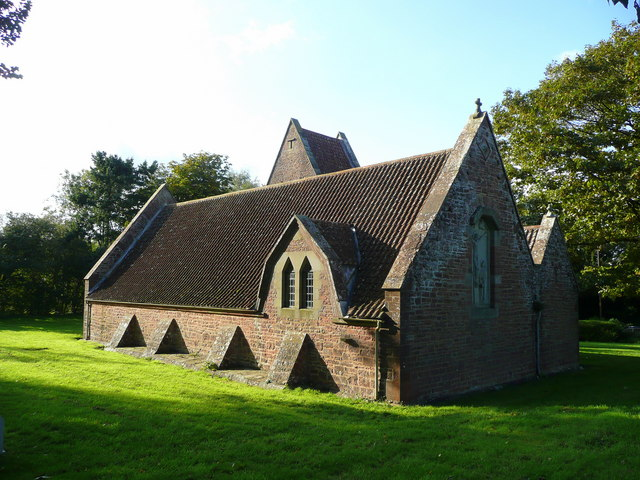
St Edward's from the southeast

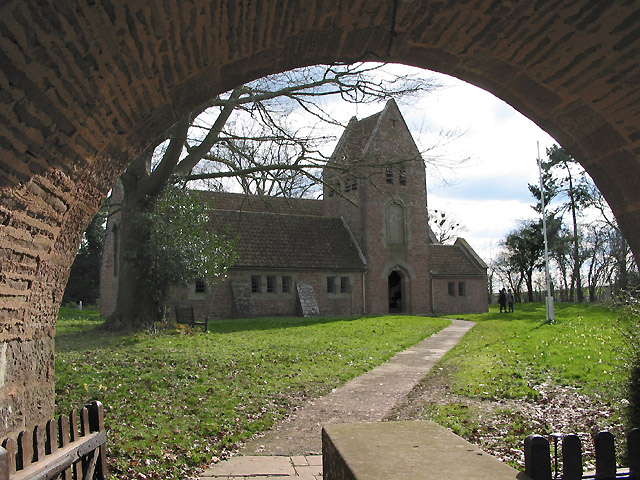
Through the lychgate

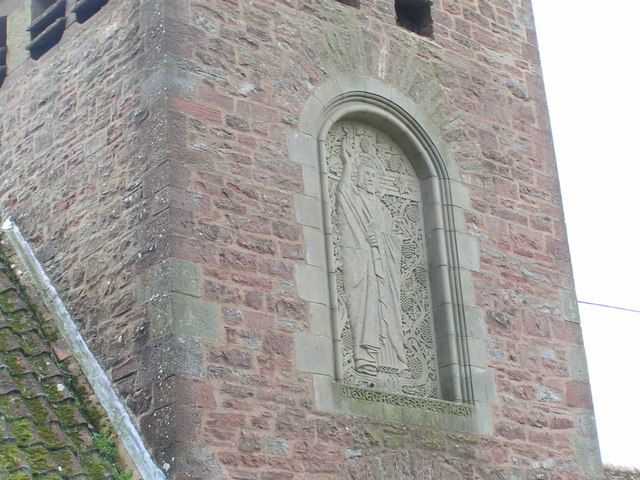
The Christ above the entrance
