= Ledbury and Gloucester Railway =

Railway line in England

Coordinates: 51.9434°N 2.4333°W

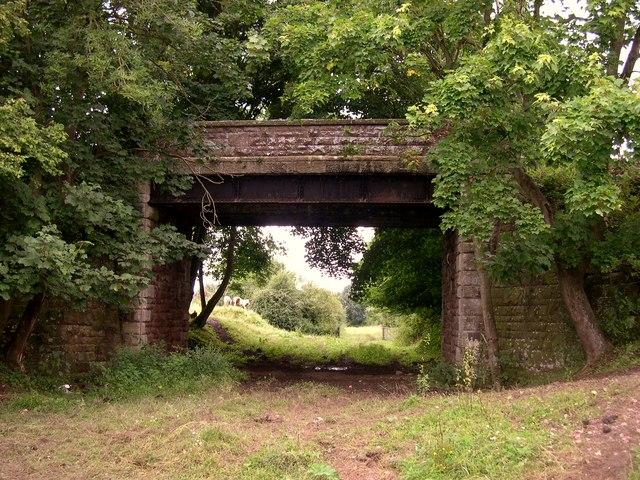
A bridge carrying a minor road over the railway trackbed near Rudford church

The Ledbury and Gloucester Railway (also known as the Daffodil Line), was a railway line in Herefordshire and Gloucestershire, England, running between Ledbury and Gloucester. It opened in 1885 and closed in 1964.

== History ==
Most of the line followed the route of the southern section of the Herefordshire and Gloucestershire Canal, which was inaugurated in 1798.

=== Construction and opening ===
Newent Railway Act 1873
- Act of Parliament
- Parliament of the United Kingdom
- Long title: An Act for authorising the construction of Railways from Over, near the River Severn, to Newent, and from Newent to Dymock, in the county of Gloucester; and for other purposes.
- Citation: 36 & 37 Vict. c. ccxxvii

Dates
- Royal assent: 5 August 1873

Text of statute as originally enacted

Newent Railway Act 1878
- Act of Parliament
- Parliament of the United Kingdom
- Long title: An Act for extending the time for the completion of the Newent Railway; and for other purposes.
- Citation: 41 & 42 Vict. c. xx

Dates
- Royal assent: 16 April 1878

Text of statute as originally enacted

Ross and Ledbury Railway Act 1873
- Act of Parliament
- Parliament of the United Kingdom
- Long title: An Act for making a Railway from Ross to Ledbury, in the counties of Gloucester and Hereford; and for other purposes.
- Citation: 36 & 37 Vict. c. ccii

Dates
- Royal assent: 28 July 1873

Text of statute as originally enacted

Ross and Ledbury Railway Act 1878
- Act of Parliament
- Parliament of the United Kingdom
- Long title: An Act for extending the time for the completion of the Railway No. 3 authorised by the Ross and Ledbury Railway Act, 1873; and for other purposes.
- Citation: 41 & 42 Vict. c. xxi

Dates
- Royal assent: 16 April 1878

Other legislation
- Amends: Ross and Ledbury Railway Act 1873

Text of statute as originally enacted

After a period of financial struggle, the canal was leased to the Great Western Railway (GWR) in 1863. Conversion to a railway began in 1881 The railway was built by two companies: the Newent Railway and the Ross and Ledbury Railway, both having received authorisation to build in the same year, by the Newent Railway Act 1873 (36 & 37 Vict. c. ccxxvii) and the Ross and Ledbury Railway Act 1873 (36 & 37 Vict. c. ccii) respectively. Colonel F. H. Rich inspected the line in July 1885, and it officially opened on 27 July. The GWR operated the railway, eventually merging with both smaller companies via the Great Western Railway Act 1892 (55 & 56 Vict. c. ccxxxiii).

=== Closure ===
The line closed to passenger traffic in 1959, with the Dymock to Gloucester section remaining open to goods traffic until 1964.

== Route ==
The line followed a south and then south-easterly route between Ledbury railway station and Gloucester Central railway station, it joined the Gloucester to Newport Line at Over Junction. Stations were established at Ledbury Town Halt, Greenway Halt, Dymock, Four Oaks Halt, Newent, Malswick Halt, and Barbers Bridge. Notably, a skew bridge that carried the line over Hereford Road in Ledbury remains in use as part of the Ledbury Town Trail footpath.
