= Four Oaks Halt railway station =

Former railway station in Gloucestershire, England

Coordinates: 51.96873°N 2.43817°W

Four Oaks Halt was a request stop on the former Ledbury and Gloucester Railway. It was located 2 miles north of Newent. The station opened on 16 October 1937 and closed in 1959 when passenger services were withdrawn from the line.

There was a simple wooden platform and shelter, built on the line of the lifted double track when it was singled.

Preceding station	Disused railways	Following station
Newent	Ledbury and Gloucester Railway; Great Western Railway	Dymock
