= St Mary's Church, Dymock =

Church in Dymock, Gloucestershire, England

Coordinates: 51°58′43″N 2°26′15″W

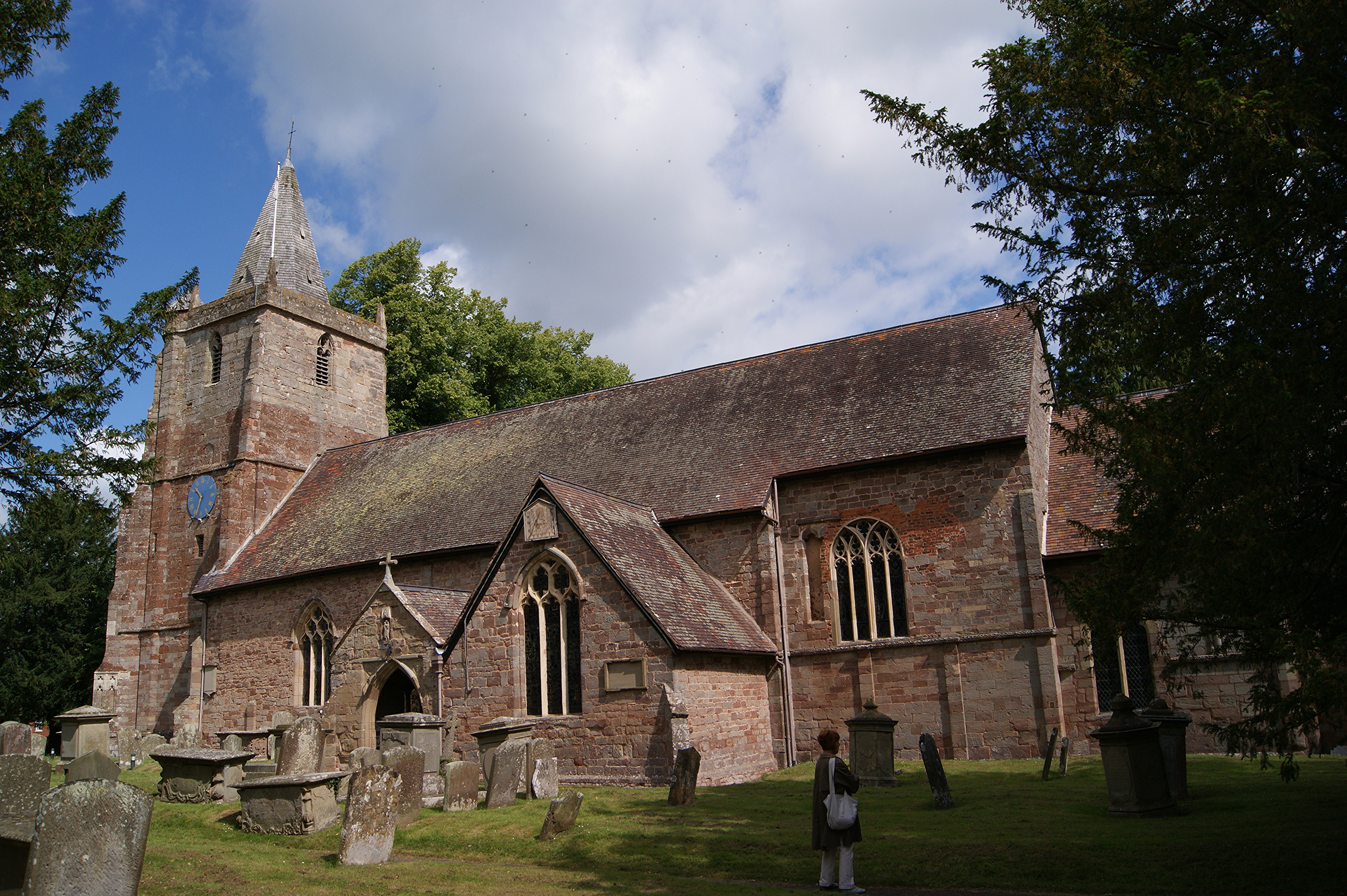
The church of St Mary's

St Mary's Church, Dymock is a Church of England parish church in the center of the village of Dymock in Gloucestershire, England. It is a Grade I listed building.

== History ==
The building is mainly Norman and is mentioned in the Domesday Book (1086 AD). The tower dates from the 15th century. The church had further Victorian restoration by John Middleton in the 19th century.

The church has been placed on the Historic England Heritage at risk register because of slow deterioration of the stonework of the tower and buttresses.

The parish is part of the benefice of Redmarley D'Abitot, Bromesberrow, Pauntley and Upleadon within the Diocese of Gloucester.

=== Dymock sculptors ===
Dymock is celebrated as the centre of a mediaeval school of Romanesque sculpture that was first described in detail by George Zarnecki in 1950. It was more fully analysed by the Reverend John Eric Gethyn-Jones, who renamed it after the Dymoch church which contains all of its characteristic motifs. Evidence of the work is also found in other churches within a ten-mile radius.

== Architecture ==
The church consists of a long 12th-century nave and a west tower dating from the 15th century, topped with a short octagonal pyramid spire. It has a south porch, and a south chapel immediately east of it. There is a north chapel not facing the south one, but further to the west. East of the nave is a 12th-century bay that was originally the lower story of a crossing tower. The tower and octagonal spire include a small octagonal stair turret and is supported by buttresses. The church includes several examples of Romanesque architecture including the doorway and windows of the nave, the stringcourse of the tower and part of the chancel wall.

The west end of the nave is devoted to a display of the Dymock poets, their work and associations. Within the church is a memorial to the men of Dymock who died in World War I and World War II.
