= Elizabeth Ralph (archivist) =

British archivist and historian

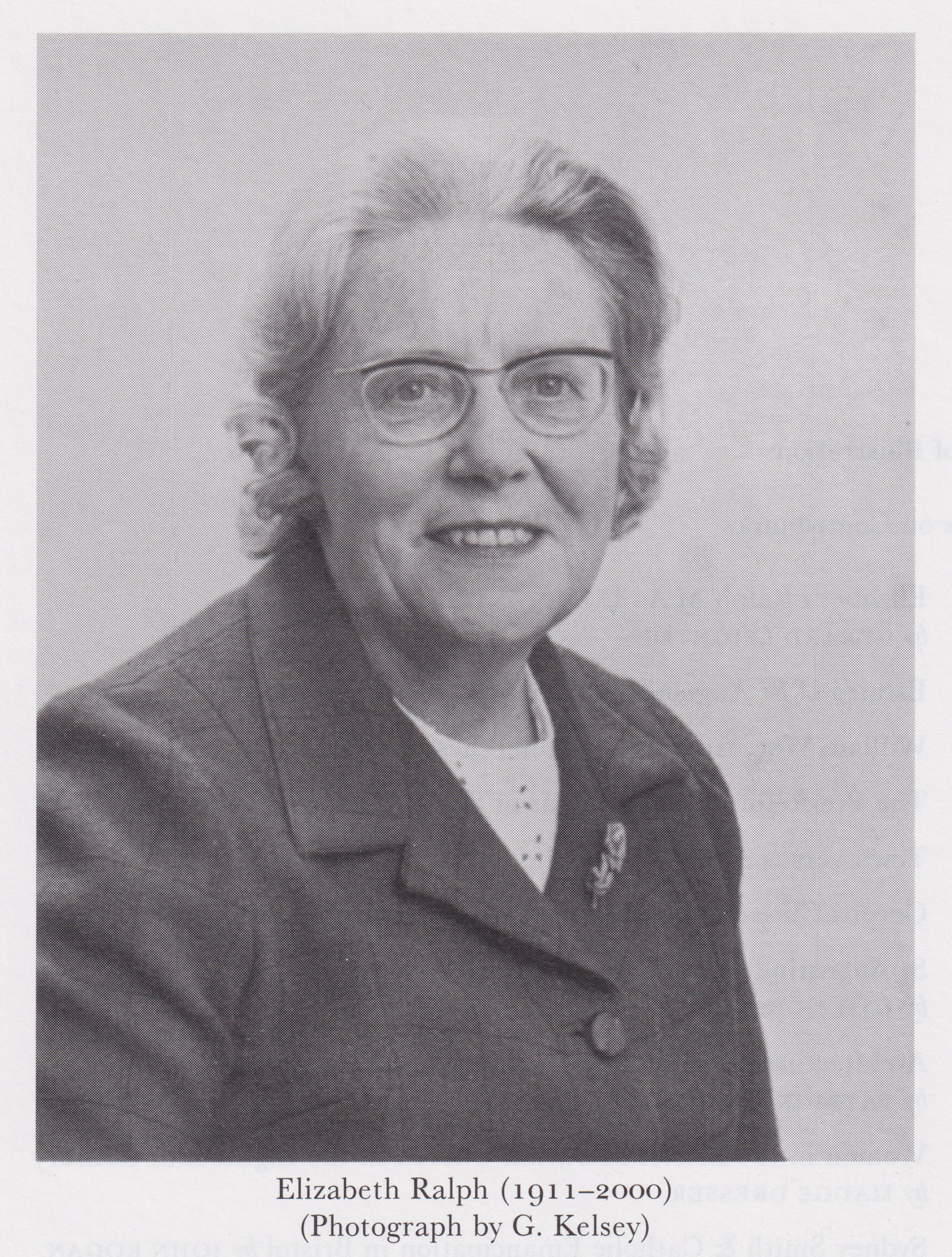
- Born: 1911
- Died: 10 January 2000 (aged 88–89); Clifton, Bristol
- Occupations: archivist and historian
- Known for: archivist, historian

Elizabeth Ralph (1911–2000) was a British archivist and historian, who was City Archivist for Bristol, 1940–1971.

== Life ==
Ralph's family came from Yorkshire, but she was brought up in Bristol, attending Fairfield Grammar School. She was trained by David Evans of the Public Record Office. Ralph joined Bristol Archive Office as a clerk in 1937 before being rapidly promoted to the position of City Archivist in 1939. During World War II she was responsible for moving Bristol's historic records to the disused Portway railway tunnel, which protected them from the Bristol Blitz. Ralph herself narrowly escaped death during the War when her house in Henleaze was destroyed by a German bomb, from which she had to be dug out.

After World War II, Ralph served as the first female chair of the Society of Archivists (1957–1960). She was General Secretary for the Bristol and Gloucestershire Archaeological Society for 38 years, Assistant Editor of the Bristol Record Society from 1946 and an active member of Bristol civic and conservation societies, including the Council for the Preservation of Ancient Bristol. 'Miss Ralph' (as she was always known) was a noted scholar, who published many works on Bristol history.

Ralph was committed to advancing the position of women. She was twice president of the Bristol Soroptimists and was their Secretary from 1940 to 1961. Within the society Miss Ralph was sometimes humorously referred to as 'Elizabeth Regina'.

She died 10 January 2000 at her home in Clifton, aged 88, following a series of strokes. Her funeral took place at her church of All Saints, Clifton.

== Honours ==
Ralph received an Honorary master's degree from the University of Bristol in 1953 and an Honorary Doctorate in 1993 for her services to Bristol and to Bristol scholarship.

Following her death in 2000, the Bristol & Gloucestershire Archaeological Society published a festschrift in her honour. A plaque was also unveiled in her honour at Bristol Archives.

In 2017, the Bristol Post named Ralph among the city's top 100 women. In 2018, she was named a 'Great Westerner' by Great Western Railways. A new Intercity Express was named after her and a commemorative 'coin' issued in her honour.

== Bibliography ==
- Ralph, Elizabeth (1939). "A Bristol Poll-Tax, 1666" (PDF). Transactions of the Bristol and Gloucestershire Archaeological Society. 61: 178–187.
- Fawcett, Edward; Ralph, Elizabeth (1939). "Mayoral Sword-Rests in Bristol, with Diary of the Swordbearers of Bristol" (PDF). Transactions of the Bristol and Gloucestershire Archaeological Society. 61: 224–270.
- Ralph, Elizabeth (1944). "Grants and Leases of Lands in King Street, Bristol" (PDF). Transactions of the Bristol and Gloucestershire Archaeological Society. 65: 160–166.
- Ralph, Elizabeth; Brown, Harold G.; Redmayne, Paul (1945). English City: the growth and future of Bristol. Bristol: J. S. Fry & Sons Ltd.
- Nott, H. E.; Ralph, Elizabeth, eds. (1948). The Deposition Books of Bristol, Vol. II, 1650-1654. Vol. 13. Bristol: Bristol Record Society.
- Ralph, Elizabeth; Evans, Henry (1950). St. Mark's the Lord Mayor's Chapel, Bristol : (formerly the Chapel of the Gaunts' Hospital). Bristol: Corporation of Bristol.
- Ralph, Elizabeth, ed. (1952). Marriage bonds for the Diocese of Bristol, excluding the Archdeaconry of Dorset. Vol. 1, 1637-1700 (PDF). Vol. 25. Gloucester: Bristol and Gloucestershire Archaeological Society.
- The Downs Committee (1961). The Downs: Clifton and Durdham Downs, 1861-1961. Bristol: The Downs Committee, Bristol.
- Gray, Irvine; Ralph, Elizabeth, eds. (1963). Guide to the parish records of the city of Bristol and the county of Gloucester (PDF). Vol. 5. Gloucester: Bristol and Gloucestershire Archaeological Society.
- Masters, Betty R.; Ralph, Elizabeth, eds. (1967). The church book of St. Ewen's, Bristol 1454-1584 (PDF). Vol. 6. Gloucester: Bristol and Gloucestershire Archaeological Society.
- Ralph, Elizabeth; Williams, Mary E., eds. (1968). The Inhabitants of Bristol in 1696. Vol. 25. Bristol: Bristol Record Society.
- Ralph, Elizabeth (1971). Guide to the Bristol Archives Office. Bristol: Bristol City Corporation.
- Smith, B.S.; Ralph, Elizabeth (1972). A History of Bristol and Gloucestershire. Henley-on-Thames.
- Ralph, Elizabeth (1973). Government of Bristol, 1373-1973. Bristol: Bristol City Council.
- Ralph, Elizabeth, ed. (1979). The Great White Book of Bristol. Vol. 32. Bristol: Bristol Record Society.
- Ralph, Elizabeth; Hardwick, Nora M., eds. (1980). Calendar of Bristol Apprentice Book, 1532-1565: Part 2, 1542-1552. Vol. 33. Bristol: Bristol Record Society.
- Ralph, Elizabeth (1981). The Streets of Bristol. Bristol: Bristol Historical Association.
- Ralph, Elizabeth; Cobb, Peter (1991). New Anglican Churches in Nineteenth Century Bristol. Bristol: Bristol Historical Association.
- Ralph, Elizabeth, ed. (1992). Calendar of the Bristol Apprentice Book, 1532-1565. Part III, 1552-1565. Vol. 43. Bristol: Bristol Record Society.
