= Francis P. Kelly =

English architectural historian

- Education: MA, 1971
- Alma mater: Courtauld Institute of Art
- Occupations: Architectural historian and inspector
- Employer: English Heritage/Historic England

Francis P. Kelly is a British architectural historian and formerly an inspector for English Heritage and Historic England, working in the south west of England. He has contributed to a number of publications on medieval buildings, and his extensive slide collection is held by Historic England. He is a member of the British Archaeological Association.

== Education ==
Francis Kelly completed his MA in 1971 at the Courtauld Institute of Art, University of London, with a dissertation on the Romanesque capitals of Southwell Minster, Nottinghamshire. He has also contributed architectural photographs to the Courtauld Institute's Conway Library archive, which is currently undergoing a digitisation project. He has maintained his links with the Courtauld, and is currently listed as a supporter on the Institute's website.

== Professional life ==
Kelly worked for English Heritage and Historic England for many years as an Inspector of Historic Buildings and Areas in the south west of England. One highlight of his career came in 1999 when he requested a dendrochronology test on the oak roof of St Mary's Church in the village of Kempley, Gloucestershire, believed to have been built by Hugh de Lacy, a Norman baron. Tests carried out in the Oxford Dendrochronology Laboratory found the church roof to be the oldest surviving medieval roof so far discovered in Britain, dating back to 1120-1150. Kelly was quoted as saying: "The vulnerability of timber roof structures, which are always prone to fire and rot, makes this survival very exciting."

In 2013, Kelly was required to do an emergency inspection of a Grade I listed church, St Odulph's in the village of Pillaton, Cornwall. The church had been badly damaged during a snowstorm on the night of 21 January 2013, when a thunderbolt struck the tower and heavy pieces of masonry from one of the pinnacles crashed through the tiled roof and fell into the church below. Kelly commented: "Tall corner pinnacles are a feature of Cornish church towers. The sheer engineering skill of the masons responsible for setting the pinnacles up in the first place, before the benefits of modern machinery, is a wonder in itself. Reinstating the pinnacle in 2013, even with the aid of complex scaffolding and modern lifting gear, proved no mean feat, all the more so as a result [of] having to take into account the distortions caused by time and the effects of the lightning strike." Kelly was responsible over the following months for overseeing the extensive repairs needed, and the church was able to reopen in November 2013, in time for the annual Remembrance Day service.

One modern-day issue with churches and chapels in the UK is that congregations have dwindled, so that some buildings stand empty and unused. Kelly has been active in this area, for example working on a project with the historian Jeremy Lake entitled 'The Big Update: Finding Uses for Cornwall’s Historic Chapels', for which they surveyed and photographed a large number of heritage buildings at risk. They produced a slide presentation showing exterior and interior views of the buildings, some of which are nationally listed, and wrote an article for the March 2014 issue of The Victorian magazine.

In 2016 Kelly donated his extensive collection of just under four thousand 35mm colour slides to the Historic England archive. The slides are mainly of historic buildings in the south west of England, focusing particularly on Bath, Wiltshire and Somerset, with some of the images depicting restoration and conservation.

Francis Kelly has moved to the south-west of France where he is Vice-President of the Association pour la Sauvegarde des Maisons et Paysages du Quercy (ASMPQ). He is also an active member of the Société des Etudes du Lot, which he joined in November 2018. He has a particular interest in studying and photographing historic French farm buildings.

== Publications ==
Kelly has written and contributed to various publications on architectural subjects:

- Medieval Art and Architecture at Exeter Cathedral: the British Archaeological Association conference transactions for the year 1985, Transactions Series, Vol. 11, British Archaeological Association, 1991.
- Kelly, Francis (1998). "The Romanesque crossing capitals of Southwell Minster: (together with a note on the lintel in the North transept and the tympanum at Hoveringham)". Southwell and Nottinghamshire / Alexander, Jennifer S. (HRSG.).: 13–23. OCLC 887039681.
- Goodall, John A. A.; Kelly, Francis (2004). Muchelney Abbey: Somerset. English Heritage. ISBN 978-1-85074-874-8.
- "Buy Guidebook: Muchelney Abbey | English Heritage". www.english-heritageshop.org.uk.
- Blaylock, Stuart R. (15 April 2013). Bowhill: The archaeological study of a building under repair in Exeter, Devon, 1977-95. English Heritage. ISBN 978-1-84802-139-6.
- Francis Kelly and Jeremy Lake, 'Cornwall's chapels', The Victorian, No. 45, March 2014.
