= Malswick Halt railway station =

Former railway station in Gloucestershire, England

Coordinates: 51.9292°N 2.3812°W

Malswick Halt was a request stop on the former Ledbury and Gloucester Railway. It opened on 1 February 1938 and was closed in 1959 when the line was closed to passengers.

Preceding station	Disused railways	Following station
Barbers Bridge	Ledbury and Gloucester Railway; Great Western Railway	Newent
