= Highleadon =

Coordinates: 51.9098°N 2.3363°W

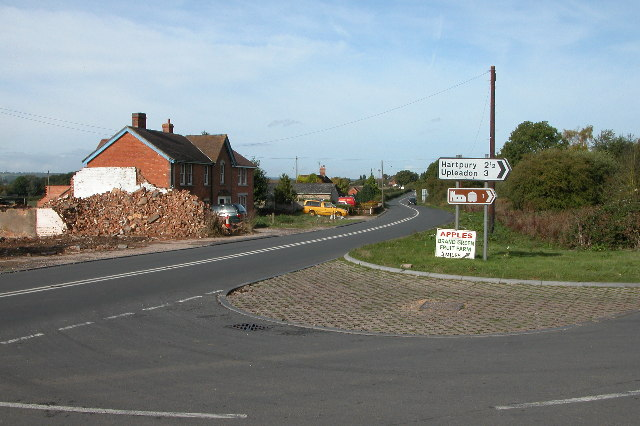
- New houses

- Location within Gloucestershire
- Civil parish: Rudford and Highleadon
- District: Forest of Dean
- Shire county: Gloucestershire
- Region: South West
- Country: England
- Sovereign state: United Kingdom
- Police: Gloucestershire
- Fire: Gloucestershire
- Ambulance: South Western

Highleadon is a village in the civil parish of Rudford and Highleadon, in the Forest of Dean district, in the county of Gloucestershire, England.

== History ==
Highleadon was formerly in the parish of Rudford, in 1866 Highleadon became a separate civil parish, on 1 April 1935 the parish was abolished and merged with Rudford. In 1931 the parish had a population of 104.
