= Ledbury Town Halt railway station =

Former railway station in Herefordshire, England

Ledbury Town Halt
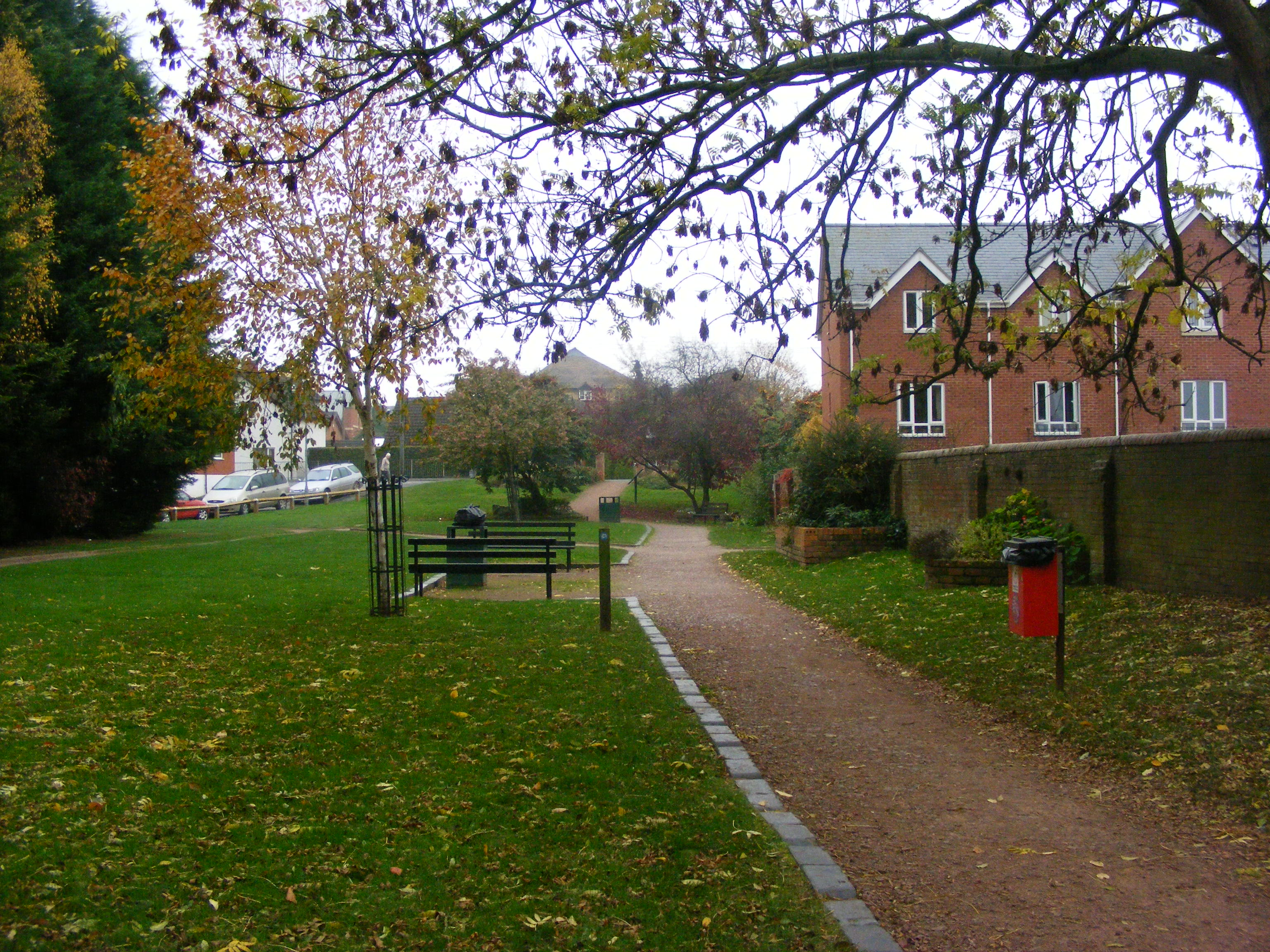
- Site of Ledbury Town Halt, now part of the Town Trail footpath

General information
- Location: Ledbury, Herefordshire; England
- Coordinates: 52.0376°N 2.4275°W
- Grid reference: SO707377

Other information
- Status: Disused

History
- Original company: Great Western Railway
- Post-grouping: Great Western Railway

Key dates
- 26 November 1938: Opened
- 13 July 1959: Closed to passengers
Location

Ledbury Town Halt was one of two stations serving the town of Ledbury. It was situated at the junction of Bridge Street and Bye Street, just to the north of the point where Bridge Street crossed the line. It was opened in 1928 and closed in 1959 when the line was closed to passengers.

The station site can be accessed by the public as part of the Ledbury Town Trail, a footpath which uses part of the old railway line.

Preceding station	Disused railways	Following station
Greenway Halt	Ledbury and Gloucester Railway; Great Western Railway	Ledbury
