= St Mary's Church, Kempley =

Church in Gloucestershire, England

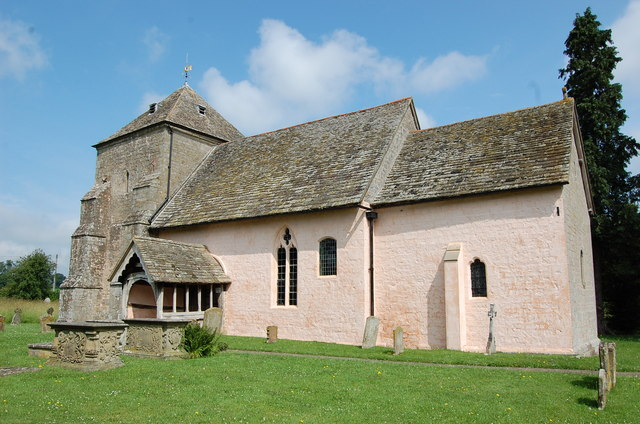
- The church seen from the southeast

- Location in Gloucestershire
- 51.9788°N 2.4820°W
- Location: Kempley, Gloucestershire
- Country: England
- Denomination: Church of England

History
- Status: parish church
- Dedication: St Mary

Architecture
- Functional status: redundant
- Heritage designation: Grade I listed
- Designated: 2 October 1954

Specifications
- Materials: rubble masonry

Administration
- Province: Canterbury
- Diocese: Diocese of Gloucester
- Archdeaconry: Archdeaconry of Cheltenham
- Deanery: Tewkesbury and Winchcombe

St Mary's Church in Kempley is a former parish church in the Forest of Dean district of Gloucestershire, England, close to the border with Herefordshire. It is a Grade I listed building. St Mary's Church is now owned by English Heritage and maintained by The Friends of Kempley Churches.

== History ==
The simple Norman church is now remote from the village it served. It has some of the best preserved medieval wall paintings in Britain. Those in the barrel-vaulted chancel, which is painted throughout, including the ceiling, are particularly rare, dating from the early 12th century. St Mary's has in its chancel "the most complete set of Romanesque frescoes in northern Europe", including the Christ in Majesty painting created in about 1120. On the walls of the nave are further images, including a wheel of life, showing the life cycle of man. The nave paintings are worked in tempera painted on dry lime mortar, unlike those in the chancel which are true frescoes.

The paintings, having been covered with whitewash, were rediscovered in 1872 during preparation for renovations. On the advice of the architect, John Henry Middleton, the renovation plans were dropped and the paintings uncovered and conserved. Sadly, such attempts to remove "the so-called 'preservative' materials" caused them to darken and to start flaking, said an English Heritage conservator. "It was very well intentioned, but what they did was wrong". As of May 2024, a decision had not yet been made as to the best method of restoring those area.

In 1999 Francis P. Kelly at English Heritage initiated a dendrochronology test on the oak roof of the church. The Oxford Dendrochronology Laboratory found the roof was the oldest medieval roof in Britain ever tested, dating back to 1120–1150.

The church has an unusually well-preserved interior. The church was restored in 1913 by Temple Moore. In the early months of the year, from late February to early March, the churchyard is often covered in wild daffodils.

The small village has two notable Anglican churches, the other, St Edward's Church, is Grade II* listed. The church, dedicated to Edward the Confessor, was built (1903–4) as a chapel of ease by the Lord of the Manor and major landowner, William Lygon, 7th Earl Beauchamp, because St Mary's was too far away from the main centres of population in the parish and liable to flooding. The newer church was built to the design of Randall Wells. St Edward's became the parish church following the redundancy of St Mary's in 1975.

== Gallery ==
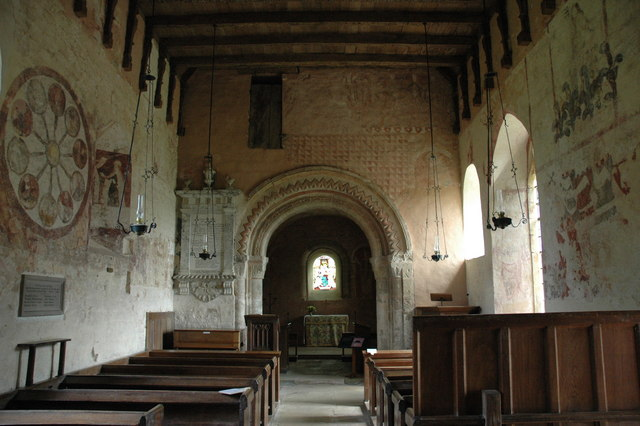
Interior of St Mary's

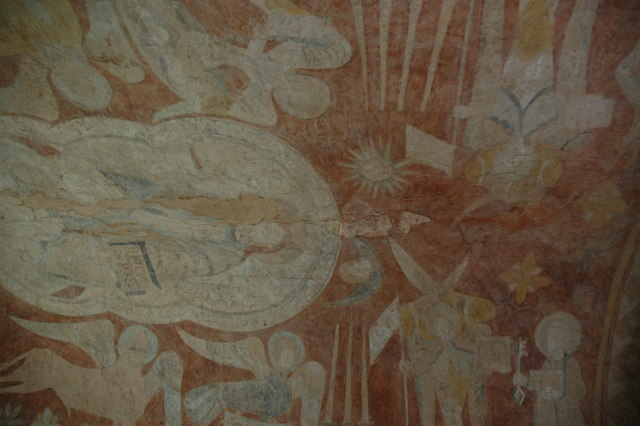
Christ in Majesty in a lobed mandorla on the chancel ceiling

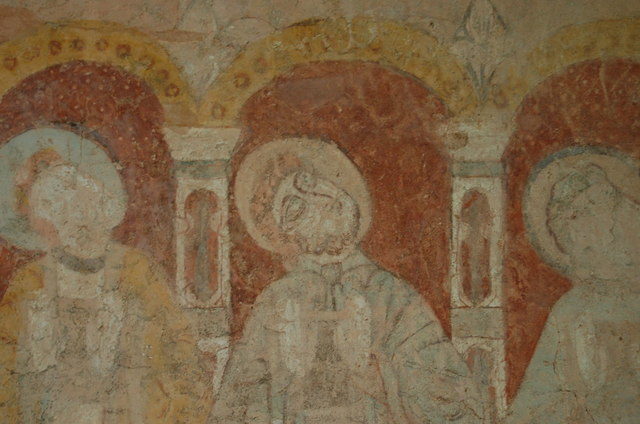

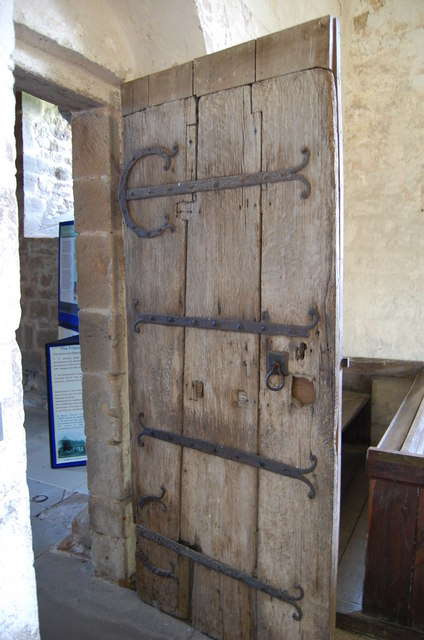
12th Century Door

Parish chest
