= Dymock =

Village in Gloucestershire, England

Coordinates: 51.979°N 2.440°W

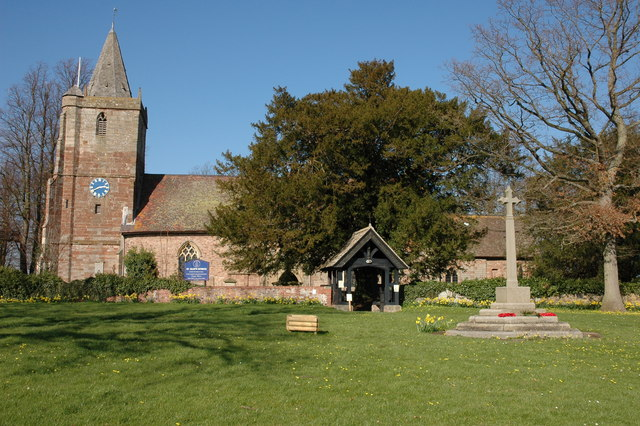
- Dymock church and War Memorial

- Location within Gloucestershire
- Population: 1,214
- OS grid reference: SO700312
- Civil parish: Dymock
- District: Forest of Dean
- Shire county: Gloucestershire
- Region: South West
- Country: England
- Sovereign state: United Kingdom
- Post town: Dymock
- Postcode district: GL18
- Police: Gloucestershire
- Fire: Gloucestershire
- Ambulance: South Western
- UK Parliament: Forest of Dean

Dymock is a village and civil parish in the Forest of Dean district of Gloucestershire, England, about four miles south of Ledbury. In 2014 the parish had an estimated population of 1,205.

Dymock is the origin of the Dymock Red, a cider apple, and Stinking Bishop cheese.

== History ==
In the village of Dymock there are several interesting buildings which include cruck beam cottages; "The White House", which was the birthplace of John Kyrle, the "Man of Ross", in 1637; Ann Cam School of 1825 and St Mary's Church, a patchwork history in brick and stone with Anglo-Norman origins, and is a Grade I listed building. Nearby stands the only remaining village pub, which was purchased by Parish Council to help preserve a thriving village. The pub is rented and run by a landlord and supported by a local fundraising and social committee "Friends of the Beauchamp Arms" (FOBA). A former pub, The Crown, closed in 1993.

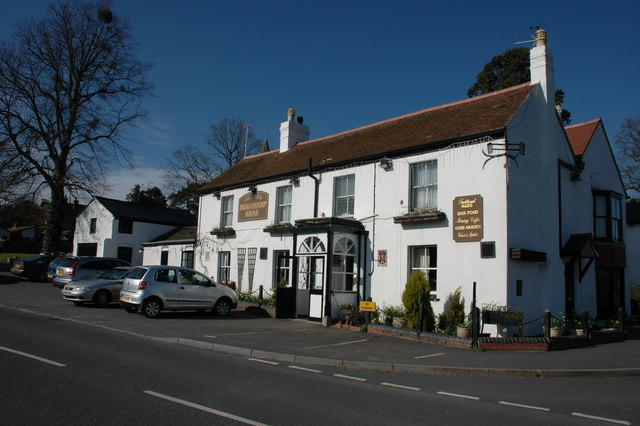
The Beauchamp Arms, Dymock

Dymock was served by the Hereford & Gloucester Canal, opened in 1845; this closed in 1881 and the section between Ledbury and Gloucester converted into a railway line, a branch line of the Great Western Railway, though a stretch between Dymock and Newent was by-passed as it was decided not to take the line through the 2,192 yard Oxenhall Tunnel. Dymock railway station was on this line which closed in 1959, but the canal (including the tunnel), is now being restored.

Dymock is the ancestral home of the Dymoke family who are the Royal Champions of England. It is thought that the Dymokes first lived at Knight's Green, an area just outside the village of Dymock.

== Notable people ==
- Michael Abercrombie FRS (1912–1979), cell biologist and embryologist.

== Governance ==
The village falls in the 'Bromesberrow and Dymock' electoral ward. This ward starts in the north at Dymock and ends in the south at Kempley. The ward total population taken at the 2011 census was 1,901.

== Popular culture ==
Dymock gave its name to a school of Romanesque sculpture first described in the book The Dymock School of Sculpture by Eric Gethyn-Jones (1979). The school is noted for its use of stepped volute capitals and its stylised "tree of life" motif on tympana. A lead tablet inscribed with an elaborate 17th-century curse against a woman called Sarah Ellis was found in a home in Wilton Place. It is preserved in Gloucester's museum collection as "The Dymock Curse".

It was the eponymous home of the Dymock poets from the period 1911–1914. The homes of Wilfrid Wilson Gibson, Lascelles Abercrombie and the American-born Robert Frost can still be seen there. Dymock is renowned for its wild daffodils in the spring, and these were probably the inspiration for the line "Two roads diverged in a yellow wood" in Frost's poem "The Road Not Taken", which was a gentle satire on his great friend, and fellow Dymock Poet, Edward Thomas. In 2011 the village featured on Countryfile, where the Dymock poets were looked into in more detail.

=== Daffodil Way ===
The Daffodil Way is a circular walk through the ′Golden Triangle', best in late February and March when wild daffodil (Narcissus pseudonarcissus) are flowering in the fields around Dymock and Kempley.
