= Greenway Halt railway station (Gloucestershire) =

Former railway station in Herefordshire, England

Coordinates: 51.9978°N 2.4396°W

Greenway Halt was a request stop on the former Ledbury and Gloucester Railway. It opened on 1st April 1937 and closed in 1959 when the line was closed to passengers. It was situated along the profile of what is now the Dymock Road, 4 miles from Ledbury. The Victorian station house remains today on the site opposite the Old Nail Shop. It continues to run in parallel to the River Leadon another mile before it reaches the village and Dymock station.

Preceding station	Disused railways	Following station
Dymock	Ledbury and Gloucester Railway; Great Western Railway	Ledbury Town Halt
