= Rudford and Highleadon =

Civil parish in Gloucestershire, England

Coordinates: 51.903°N 2.330°W

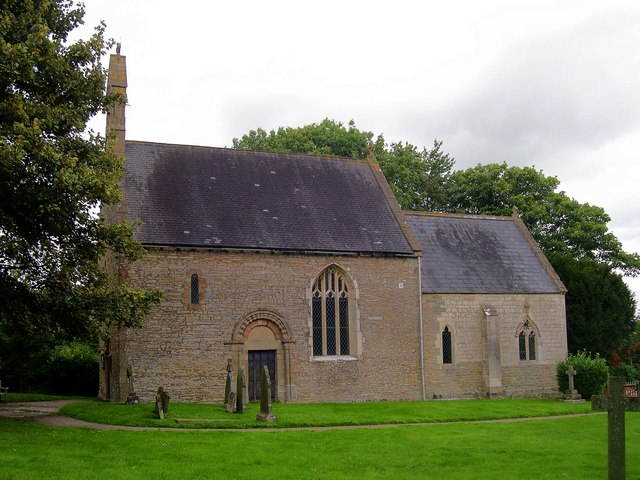
- St Mary's Church, Rudford

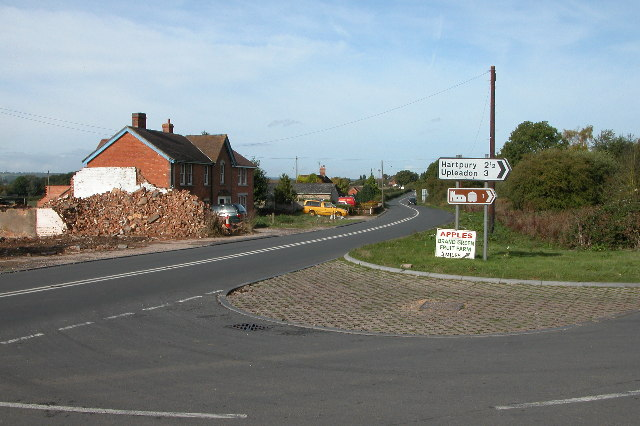
- New houses, Highleadon

- Location within Gloucestershire
- Area: 5.283 km^{2} (2.040 sq mi)
- Population: 288 (2011 census)
  - Density: 55/km^{2} (140/sq mi)
- Civil parish: Rudford and Highleadon
- District: Forest of Dean
- Shire county: Gloucestershire
- Region: South West
- Country: England
- Sovereign state: United Kingdom
- Police: Gloucestershire
- Fire: Gloucestershire
- Ambulance: South Western

Rudford and Highleadon is a civil parish in Gloucestershire, England, made up of Rudford and Highleadon. It is in the Forest of Dean District. In 2011, its population was 288. It has a parish council, the lowest tier of local government.

The area of the parish is 527.88 hectares (2.0382 sq mi).

== History ==
On 1 April 1935 the parish of Highleadon was merged with Rudford, on 16 September 1976 the parish was renamed "Rudford and Highleadon".
