= W. D. Pereira =

British science fiction and historical author

Wilfred Dennis Pereira
- Born: November 16, 1921; London, United Kingdom
- Died: 2014 (aged 92–93)
- Occupation(s): Writer, Advertising Agent
- Children: 1

Wilfred Dennis Pereira (16 November 1921 – 2014) was a British science fiction and historical author.

== Selected publications ==
=== Novels ===
- Time of Departure
- Serene Retreat
- Johnson's Journey
- The Lion and the Lambs
- North Flight
- Lark Ascending
- The Cauldrons of the Storm
- Arrow in the Air

=== Short stories ===
- The Wheat from the Chaff
- An Uncertainty of Marriages
- Funny Business
- More Funny Business

=== Science fiction ===
- Aftermath 15. Robert Hale, London, 1973.
- The Charon Tapes. Robert Hale, London, 1975.
- Another Eden. Robert Hale, London, 1976.
- Contact. Robert Hale, London, 1977.
- The King of Hell. Robert Hale, London, 1978.
- Celeste. Robert Hale, London, 1979.

=== Historical ===
- The Siege of Gloucester.
- The Battle of Tewkesbury. Cheltenham: Line One, 1983. ISBN 0907036163
