= Dymock railway station =

Former railway station in Gloucestershire, England

Coordinates: 51.9775°N 2.4403°W

Dymock
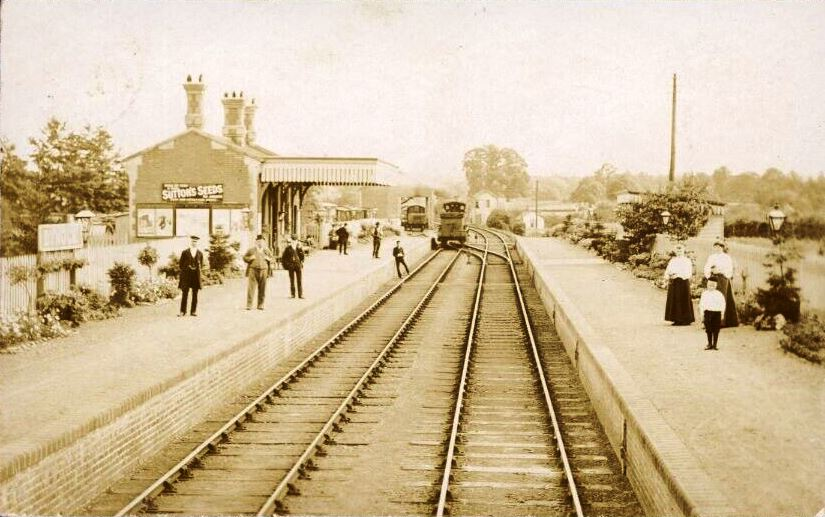

General information
- Location: Dymock, Gloucestershire; England

Other information
- Status: Disused

History
- Original company: Great Western Railway
- Post-grouping: Great Western Railway

Key dates
- 27 July 1885: Opened
- 13 July 1959: Closed to passengers
- 1964: closed to freight
Location

Dymock railway station was a stop on the former Ledbury and Gloucester Railway. It opened in 1885 and served the Gloucestershire village of Dymock. It had a passing loop, as well as a goods shed and goods yard. It was closed for passengers in 1959 but remained open for freight traffic until 1964 when the line was closed.

Preceding station	Disused railways	Following station
Four Oaks Halt	Ledbury and Gloucester Railway; Great Western Railway	Greenway Halt
