= Kempley =

Village in Gloucestershire, England

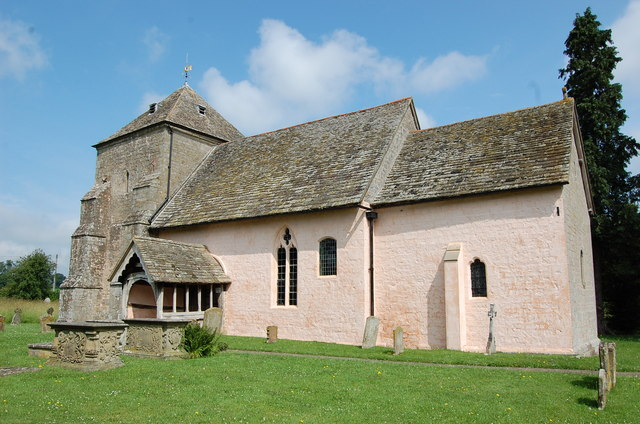
- St Mary's Church, with the oldest roof of any building in Britain

- Location within Gloucestershire
- Population: 280 (2011)
- OS grid reference: SO671295
- District: Forest of Dean
- Shire county: Gloucestershire
- Region: South West
- Country: England
- Sovereign state: United Kingdom
- Post town: Dymock
- Postcode district: GL18
- Police: Gloucestershire
- Fire: Gloucestershire
- Ambulance: South Western
- UK Parliament: Forest of Dean

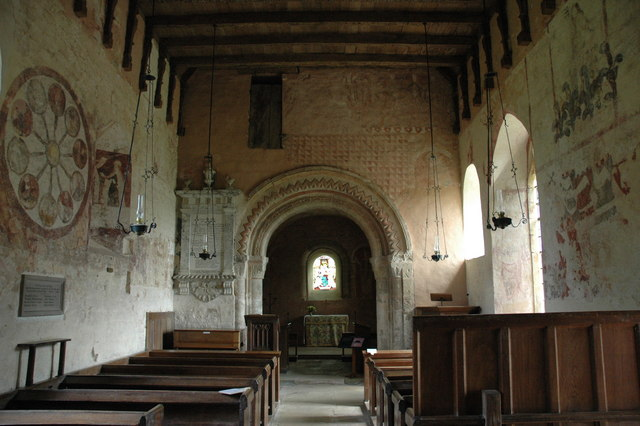
Interior of St Mary's

Kempley is a village and civil parish in the Forest of Dean district of Gloucestershire, England, close to the border with Herefordshire. It lies 17 miles (27 km) northwest of Gloucester and 17 miles (27 km) of Hereford. The nearest market towns of Newent and Ledbury are 5 miles (8.0 km) and 8 miles (13 km) away respectively.

The village maintains the Kempley Tardis (a redundant telephone box) - a National Lottery funded project supported by English Heritage. The project, which is run by the Friends of Kempley Churches, aims to archive and document the entire social, economic and cultural history of the village.

In March 1994 fields near the village were found to contain the remains of two of the victims of serial killer Fred West. The small parish (280 residents) has two notable churches, one dedicated to St Mary and another to St Edward the Confessor.

== St Mary's Church ==
St Mary's Church, Kempley has in its chancel "the most complete set of Romanesque frescos in northern Europe", including the Christ in Majesty painting created in about 1120. On the walls of the nave are further images, including a wheel of life, showing the life cycle of man. These are worked in tempera painted on dry lime mortar, unlike those in the chancel which are true frescoes. St Mary's Church is owned by English Heritage and maintained by The Friends of Kempley Churches.(Location: 51.9787°N 2.4823°W)

The Church has the oldest timber roof of any building in Britain, dating from 1120 to 1150 and has an unusually well-preserved interior. In the early months of the year, from late February to early March, the churchyard is very beautiful, often being covered in wild daffodils.

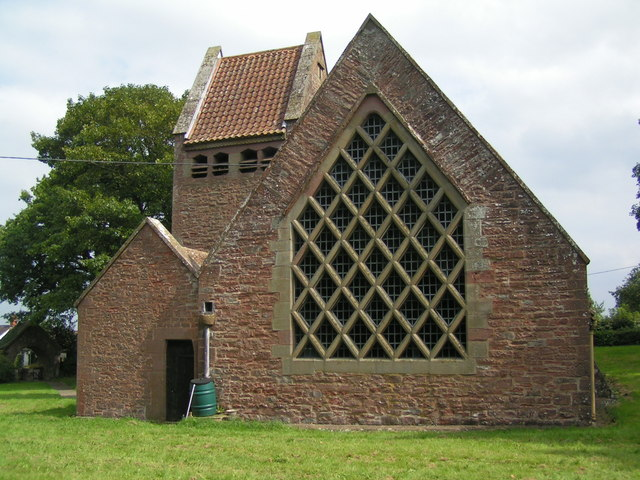
St Edward's Church

== St Edward's Church ==
The Church of St Edward (1903), described by Betjeman as "a mini-cathedral of the Arts and Crafts movement", was built from local materials by local labour, under the direction of Randall Wells, clerk of works at All Saints' Church, Brockhampton. The church was planned by the Lord of the Manor and major landowner, William Lygon, 7th Earl Beauchamp, because St Mary's was too far away from the main centres of population in the parish at Kempley Green and Fishpool, and liable to flooding. The walls of the church are in Forest of Dean red sandstone.
