= Bromsberrow =

Village in Gloucestershire, England

Coordinates: 52.00382°N 2.38016°W

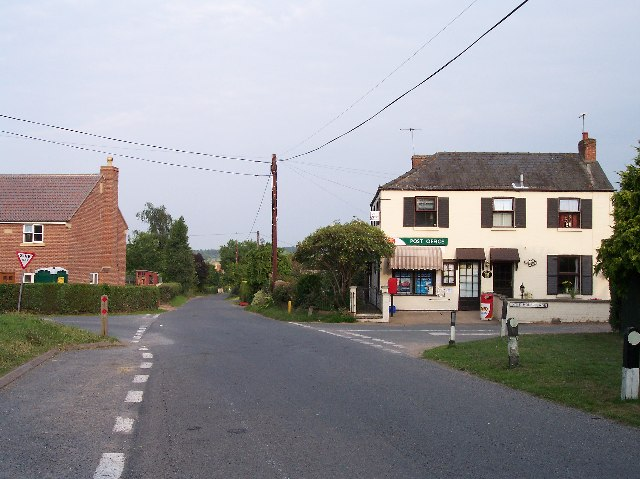
- Bromsberrow Heath, the largest settlement in the parish

- Location within Gloucestershire
- Population: 407 (2011)
- OS grid reference: SO7434
- Civil parish: Bromesberrow
- District: Forest of Dean
- Shire county: Gloucestershire
- Region: South West
- Country: England
- Sovereign state: United Kingdom
- Post town: LEDBURY
- Postcode district: HR8
- Dialling code: 01531
- Police: Gloucestershire
- Fire: Gloucestershire
- Ambulance: South Western
- UK Parliament: Forest of Dean

Bromsberrow (or Bromesberrow) is a village and civil parish in the Forest of Dean district. The village is close to the meeting point between Gloucestershire, Herefordshire, and Worcestershire. The nearest town is Ledbury, about four miles north in Herefordshire. In 2011 the parish had a population of 407.

A resident of the village named Emily Bishop (c1879-1961) was recorded extensively singing traditional folk songs by the folklorist Peter Kennedy in 1952.

The village was briefly home to Richard Hammond, the former Top Gear presenter, who resided on a farm next to St. Mary's Church.

== Identify as Bremesbyrig ==
Anglo-Saxon Chronicle states that in 910 Aethelflaed constructed a stronghold at "Bremesbyrig"; the location is suspected either being Bromsberry or Bromsgrove.

== Gallery ==
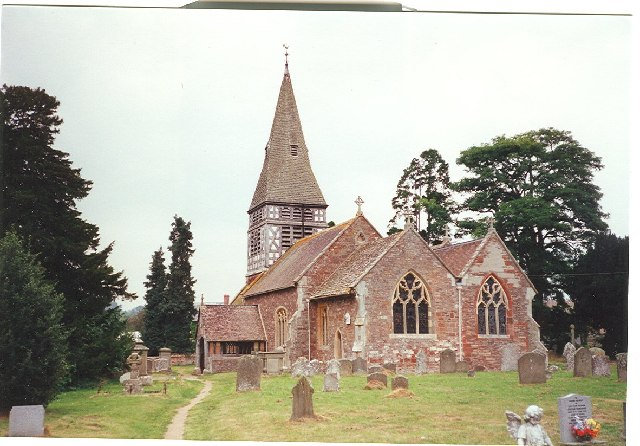
St. Mary's Church is in Bromsberrow itself

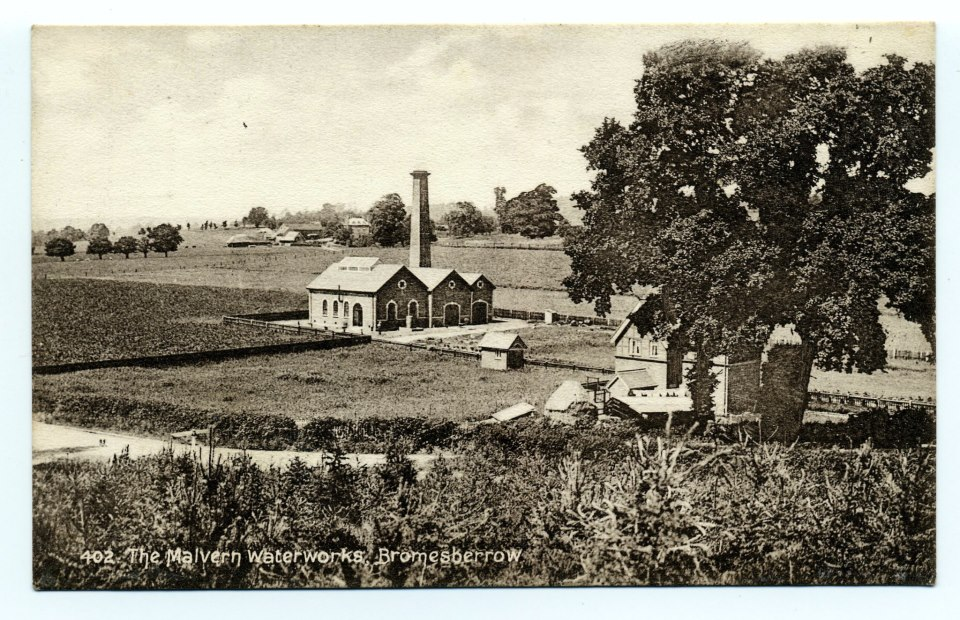
Malvern Waterworks
