= Francis Hyett =

English antiquarian

Francis Hyett by Hugh Goldwin Riviere. Oil on canvas, 1927. Gloucester Shire Hall.

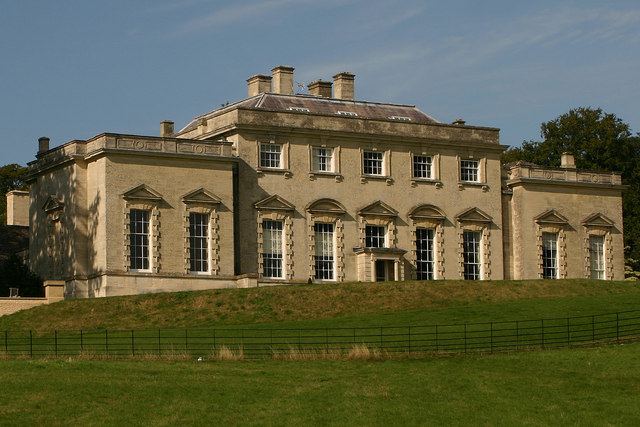
Painswick House

Sir Francis Adams Hyett (1844–1941) was chairman of Gloucestershire County Council from 1918 to 1920.

== Early life and family ==
Francis Hyett was born in Painswick House in 1844, the son of William Henry Hyett. He was educated at Eton College, and matriculated at Trinity Hall, Cambridge in 1864, graduating B.A. in 1868. He was called to the bar at the Inner Temple in 1872, and worked as a conveyancer.

== Career ==
Hyett was a co-founder of the Marling School in Stroud.

Hyett was chairman of Gloucestershire County Council from 1918 to 1920.

From 1895 to 1937, he served as chairman of Barnwood House Hospital, a private Mental Asylum in the outskirts of Gloucester. His Father was instrumental in the founding of the hospital in Barnwood and was its first chairman.

== Death and legacy ==
Hyett died in 1941. His portrait by Hugh Goldwin Riviere is in Gloucester Shire Hall.

== Selected publications ==
- Gloucester and her Governor during the Great Civil War. A lecture, etc. John Bellows, Gloucester, 1891.
- The Civil War in the Forest of Dean, 1643-1645. 1895.
- The Painswick Annual Register. Jan. 1890-Dec. 1899. A decade of parochial history. Gloucester, 1900. (compiler)
- Florence. Her History and Art to the Fall of the Republic. Methuen, London, 1903.
- An Octet of Sonnets by F. A. H. With Christmas Greetings from the Author. Essex House Press, Chipping Campden, 1905.
- Gloucester in National History. John Bellows, Gloucester; Kegan Paul & Co., London; 1906.
- Chattertoniana, Being a Classified Catalogue of Books, Pamphlets, Magazine Articles, & Other Printed Matter Relating to the Life or Works of Chatterton, or to the Rowley Controversy. John Bellows, Gloucester, 1914. (With William Bazeley)
- Glimpses of the History of Painswick, with a Bibliography of its Literature. John Bellows, Gloucester, 1928.
