= Rudford =

Coordinates: 51.8934°N 2.3214°W

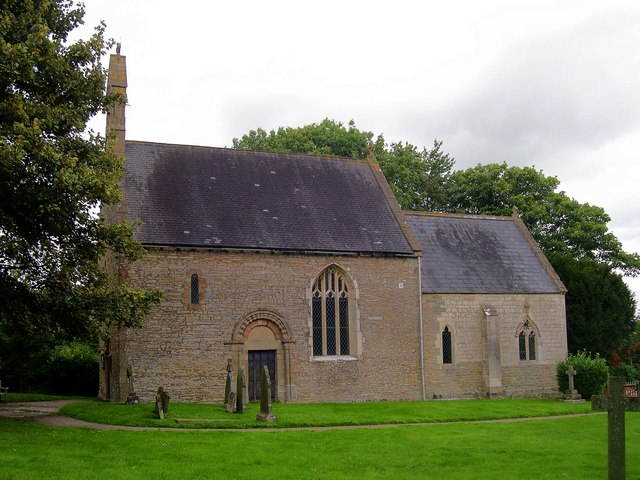
- St Mary's Church, Rudford

- Location within Gloucestershire
- OS grid reference: SO779217
- Civil parish: Rudford and Highleadon
- District: Forest of Dean
- Shire county: Gloucestershire
- Region: South West
- Country: England
- Sovereign state: United Kingdom
- Police: Gloucestershire
- Fire: Gloucestershire
- Ambulance: South Western
- UK Parliament: Forest of Dean

Rudford is a village and former civil parish, now in the parish of Rudford and Highleadon, in the Forest of Dean district, in the county of Gloucestershire, England. It is located approximately 4 miles (6 km) north-west of Gloucester and 5 miles (8 km) south-east of Newent. The local church is dedicated to St Mary. In 1931 the parish had a population of 114.

== History ==
On 1 April 1935 the parish of Highleadon was merged with Rudford. On 16 September 1976 the parish was renamed "Rudford & Highleadon".
