= Bristol and Gloucestershire Archaeological Society =

Learned society in England

The Bristol and Gloucestershire Archaeological Society is a learned society concerned with the history and antiquities of the City of Bristol and the historic county of Gloucestershire. It was founded on 21 April 1876; and is a registered charity, number 202014.

== Aims and activities ==
The aims of the society are to "advance and promote the education of the public in the history, heritage and archaeology of Bristol and Gloucestershire".

The activities of the society include:

- encouraging and facilitating research and practical engagement
- providing avenues for publication and the public dissemination of knowledge
- public engagement through meetings, talks and events
- advocating the appropriate care and protection of historic sites, buildings, objects and records; and the appropriate development of public facilities and access.

== Protection of historic sites ==
Particularly in its early decades, the society took steps to rescue several important sites and buildings in its area of interest. These included:

- 1899 – intervention to excavate and arrest the deterioration of the ruins of Hailes Abbey, exciting great public interest; it renovated an old barn to serve as a site museum
- 1906 – erection of sheds to protect Roman pavements at Great Witcombe Roman Villa
- 1923 – an initiative to save Chedworth Roman Villa (discovered 1864), raising the funds to buy the property and put it in the care of the National Trust.
- 1928 – persuading the owner of Belas Knap long barrow to place it in the care of the state (Office of Works), allowing methodical investigation and restoration to begin
- 1928 – with the Royal Society of Arts, forming a trust to run Arlington Row, Bibury, which the RSA had just acquired. After joint fund-raising, this trust continued to 1949, when the properties were conveyed to the National Trust

== Publications ==
The society has an extensive history of publication. Its annual journal, the Transactions, has been published continuously since 1876. All volumes to vol. 132 (2014) have been digitised, and are freely available on the society's website. The society acts as a text publication society, and between 1952 and 1985, its Record Section issued 13 editions of Bristol and Gloucestershire records and related material, all now available via its website. Since 1988 the society has published annually in its Gloucestershire Record Series a volume comprising an edition of some historical record or collection of records relating to the history of Gloucestershire. (This Series does not publish records relating exclusively to Bristol, to avoid undue overlap with the activities of the separate Bristol Record Society, founded in 1929.) The society has also published occasional monographs and thematic essay volumes relating to its areas of interest.

== Library ==
The society's library is held at the University of Gloucestershire, Cheltenham.
