= Ruardean =

Village in Gloucestershire, England

Coordinates: 51.854204°N 2.549622°W

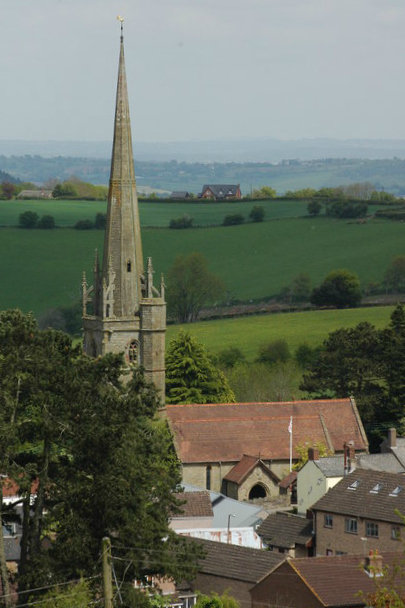

- Location within Gloucestershire
- Population: 1,399 (2011)
- OS grid reference: SO621175
- District: Forest of Dean
- Shire county: Gloucestershire
- Region: South West
- Country: England
- Sovereign state: United Kingdom
- Post town: Ruardean
- Postcode district: GL17
- Police: Gloucestershire
- Fire: Gloucestershire
- Ambulance: South Western
- UK Parliament: Forest of Dean

Ruardean is a village in the Forest of Dean, Gloucestershire, England, to the North West of Cinderford. It is situated on a hillside with views west towards the mountains of South Wales. Little now remains of the village's industrial history, but once it was a centre for iron-ore smelting furnaces, forges and coal mines. The Norman castle, now little more than a mound, commanded the shortest route from Gloucester Castle to the Welsh Marches and the Wye Valley.

== History ==
The village has been, in times past, an important centre of iron and coal mining, though little evidence remains of this aspect of the village's history. The main historical landmark of the village is Ruardyn Castle, near to the parish church. In the past the village was spelt as Ruardyn and was part of Herefordshire. Nowadays the village lies inside Gloucestershire and is part of the Forest of Dean district. Like much of the surrounding area, Ruardean has historically been relatively poor; the 1831 census records 127 families, with half the population employed in agriculture and 160 people on poor relief.

St John the Baptist's Church, dating from 1111 AD, is the village's centrepiece and main landmark, including a nave, chancel, tower and spire added in the 14th century and a chapel added in 1798. The church is a Grade II* listed building. A manor house which once stood in the field behind the church was crenellated in 1310 to become Ruardyn Castle but this was largely destroyed by Oliver Cromwell's troops in the English Civil War.

Ruardean's Congregationalist minister in the early 19th century was Reverend John Horlick. His relatives, James and William, born in Ruardean, were the inventors of the hot malt drink Horlicks. The shed in which they first developed the technique of producing dried milk with malt, in the 1860s, still stands behind the Malt Shovel public house on the high street.

=== "Who killed the bears?" ===
A notable event in the village's history occurred on 26 April 1889. Four Frenchmen and their two tame bears were making their way to Ruardean, having performed in Cinderford. They were attacked by a mob, enraged by rumours that the bears had killed a child and injured a woman. The bears were killed and the Frenchmen badly beaten. It soon became clear that the bears had not attacked anyone. Police proceedings followed, and 13 colliers and labourers appeared before magistrates at Littledean a week later, charged with ill-treating and killing the bears, and assaulting the Frenchmen. All but two were found guilty on one or more charges, with another convicted a week later. A total of £85 (equivalent to £11,867 in 2023) was paid in fines. A subscription was also launched which generously compensated the Frenchmen.

The question "Who killed the bears?" was used for many years as an insult, directed particularly towards people from Ruardean, despite the fact that all those convicted were from Cinderford. This caused a long-term feud between the inhabitants of the town and village.

== Education ==
Ruardean's first school was established in 1774, providing 43 places in 1833. Modern-day Ruardean contains one school, the Ruardean Church of England Primary School, with 90 pupils. The nearest secondary school is the Dene Magna Community School in Mitcheldean. There is also a second primary school nearby, in Ruardean Woodside.

== Sport ==
The village has a Men's football club named Ruardean United. The club plays its home matches at Ruardean Memorial Ground. They compete in North Gloucestershire Division 2.

== Nearby places ==
- Ruardean Hill
- Brierley
- The Pludds
- Ruardean Woodside

== Notable people ==
- James (1844–1921) and William Horlick (1846–1936), the inventors of malted milk powder who gave their name to Horlicks, were born in Ruardean.
