= Mitcheldean Meend Marsh =

Nature reserve in Gloucestershire, England

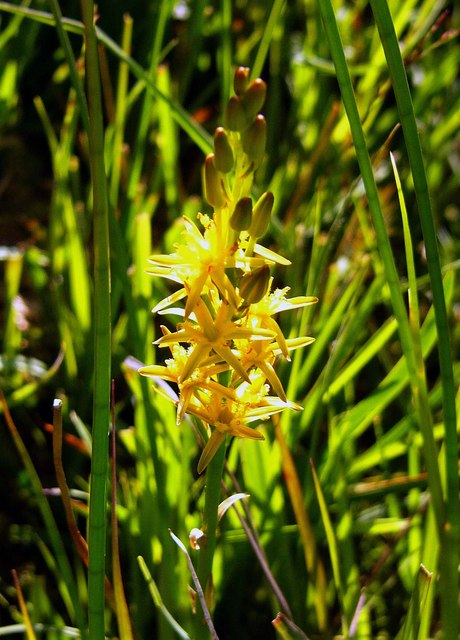
- Example - Bog Asphodel (Narthecium ossifragum)

- Location within Gloucestershire
- Type: Gloucestershire Wildlife Trust nature reserve
- Location: Hazel Hill north of Drybrook
- Coordinates: 51°51′35.69″N 2°30′47.76″W
- Area: 1.75 acres (0.71 ha)
- Created: 1983
- Operator: Gloucestershire Wildlife Trust Forestry Commission
- Status: Open all year

Mitcheldean Meend Marsh (grid reference SO647180) is a 0.7-hectare (1.7-acre) nature reserve in Gloucestershire in the Forest of Dean. The site is listed in the 'Forest of Dean Local Plan Review' as a Key Wildlife Site (KWS).

The site is managed by the Gloucestershire Wildlife Trust under lease from the Forestry Commission since 1983.

== Location and habitat ==
The reserve is triangular in shape and is sited at Hazel Hill, which is to the north of Drybrook near Mitcheldean. The reserve is next to Mitcheldeanmeend Inclosure, which is a conifer plantation. It lies to the south of Puddlebrook Quarry which is a Site of Special Scientific Interest. The reserve is in the Dean Coal Measures.

Access to the reserve is from a forest track which is on the southern boundary. There is a permissive footpath through the site.

The marsh is a relic of the Mitcheldean Meend Bog which once covered an extensive area. This bog was enclosed and planted in the 18th and 19th centuries. There was planting of Scots Pine and Norway Spruce in 1924. The marsh includes a small 'quaking bog'.

== Flora ==
The reserve is considered to have one of the best collections of wet heathland and bog plants in the county. Notable plants are bog asphodel, common cotton-grass, few-flowered spike-rush and tawny sedge. The loss of local habitat has resulted in this reserve becoming an important conservation area. Also recorded are lesser spearwort and marsh pennywort.

There is a drier area of heathland around the marsh which supports creeping willow, sneezewort, common fleabane, devil's-bit scabious, purple moor-grass, heather, cross-leaved heath heather and bell heather. The boundaries of the reserve are edged with bramble, gorse, silver birch and willow. rosebay willowherb flourishes in one corner and its spread is controlled.

== Bird life ==
The reserve is a good site for hedgerow and open ground birds. Notable visitors are winter flocks of finches.

== Conservation ==
Invasive scrub is cleared and the footpath kept open to encourage people not to walk in the marsh, this being a sensitive wildlife area.

== Publications ==
- Kelham, A, Sanderson, J, Doe, J, Edgeley-Smith, M, et al., 1979, 1990, 2002 editions, 'Nature Reserves of the Gloucestershire Trust for Nature Conservation/Gloucestershire Wildlife Trust'
- ‘Nature Reserve Guide – discover the wild Gloucestershire on your doorstep’ - 50th Anniversary, January 2011, Gloucestershire Wildlife Trust
