= Ruardean Woodside =

Village in Gloucestershire, England

Coordinates: 51.8470°N 2.5422°W

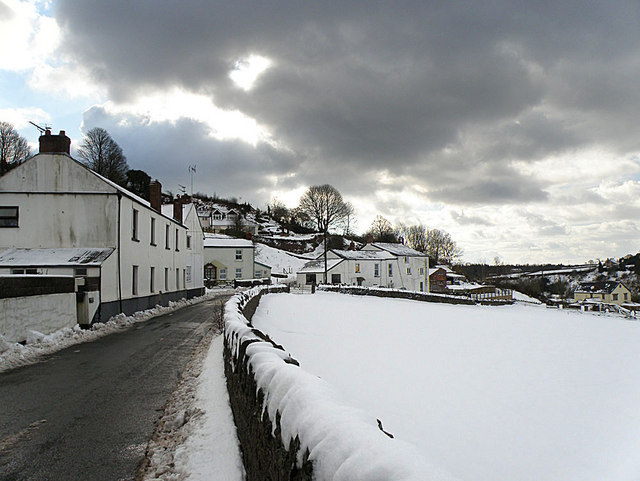

- Location within Gloucestershire
- OS grid reference: SO627166
- District: Forest of Dean
- Shire county: Gloucestershire
- Region: South West
- Country: England
- Sovereign state: United Kingdom
- Police: Gloucestershire
- Fire: Gloucestershire
- Ambulance: South Western
- UK Parliament: Forest of Dean

Ruardean Woodside is a village in Gloucestershire, England, located in the Forest of Dean and tucked away behind Ruardean Hill and Brierley. There is a primary school and a village hall. The Roebuck was the last of the local pubs to close.

== Education ==
Woodside Primary School (informally known as The Slad) is located at the bottom of the village, on the road between neighbouring settlements of Brierley and Ruardean. The nearest secondary school is Dene Magna Community School in Mitcheldean.

== Nearby places ==
- Ruardean Hill
- Brierley
- The Pludds
- Ruardean

== See also ==
- Ruardean
