= Wyedean Rally =

Wyedean Rally logo

The Wyedean Rally, currently known as the Winner Garage Skoda Wyedean Stages Rally, is an annual motorsport rally, held in the Forest of Dean, Gloucestershire, England. It is organised by the Forest of Dean Motor Club. The current chairman is Paul Loveridge .

== History ==
The Wyedean Rally was to have returned on 9 November 2019, Forest of Dean Motor Club, have moved it back to the traditional date in November while retaining the Welsh championship status.

The event runs entirely in the Forest of Dean, with the start, finish, and service areas, located at the Vantage Point Business Village in Mitcheldean. As of 2016, the event will feature six stages and around 40 miles of gravel roads. Approximately 120 cars will be taking part in the event.
