= Newent =

Town in the Forest of Dean in Gloucestershire, England

Coordinates: 51.93°N 2.40°W

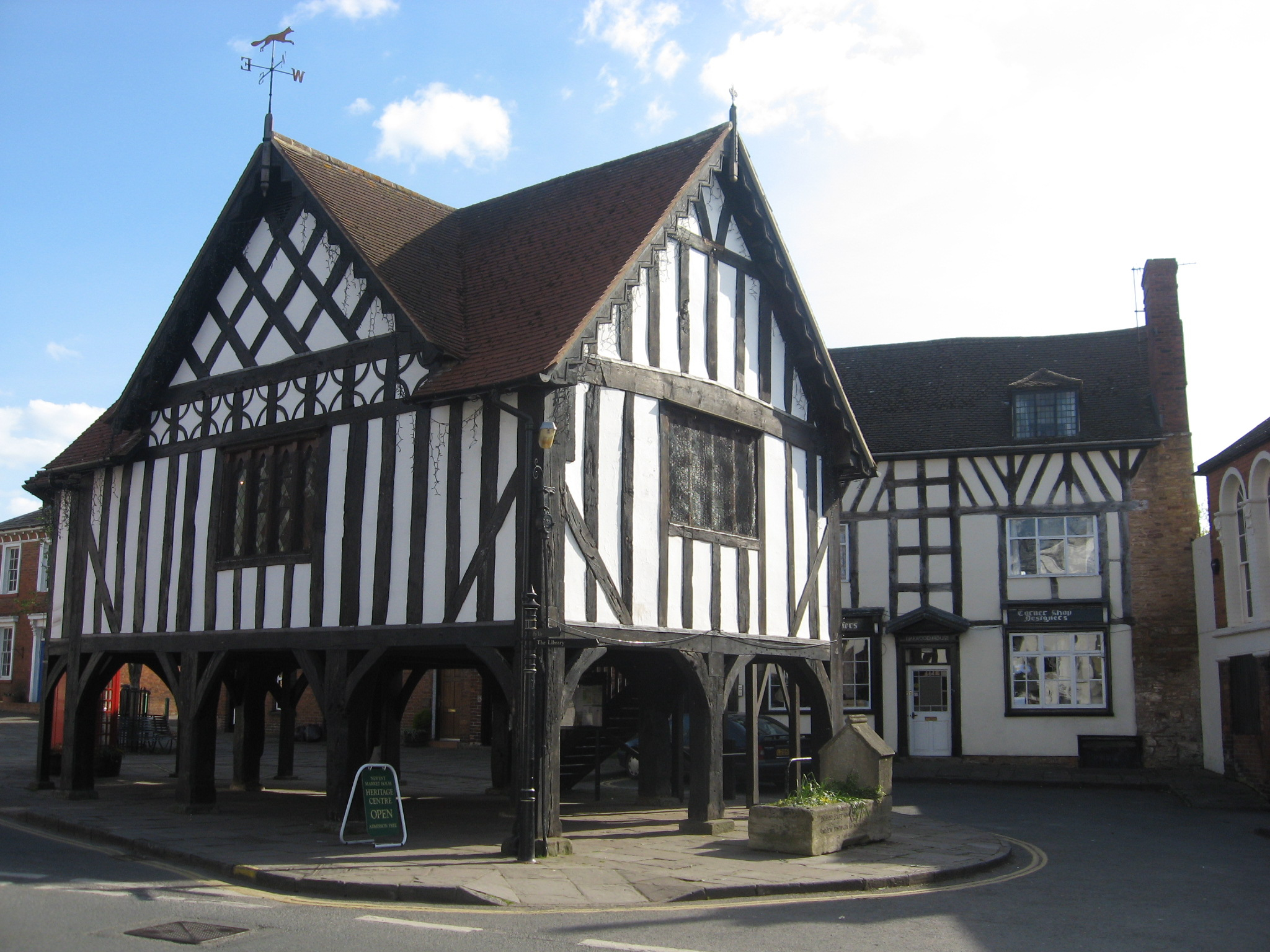
- The Market House, Newent

- Location within Gloucestershire
- Population: 6,277 (parish, 2021 Census)
- OS grid reference: SO7225
- Civil parish: Newent
- District: Forest of Dean
- Shire county: Gloucestershire
- Region: South West
- Country: England
- Sovereign state: United Kingdom
- Post town: NEWENT
- Postcode district: GL18
- Dialling code: 01531
- Police: Gloucestershire
- Fire: Gloucestershire
- Ambulance: South Western
- UK Parliament: Forest of Dean

Newent (/ˈnjuːənt/; originally called "Noent") is a market town and civil parish in the municipal district of Forest of Dean in Gloucestershire, England, though not in the "Royal Forest of Dean". The town is 11 miles (18 km) north-west of Gloucester. Its population was 5,073 at the 2001 census, rising to 5,207 in 2011, The population was 6,777 at the 2021 Census. Once a medieval market and fair town, its site had been settled at least since Roman times. The first written record of it appears in the 1086 Domesday Book.

== Etymology ==
Noent, Newent's original name, may have meant "new place" in Celtic. It also may mean "new inn", referring to lodgings for travellers to Wales, according to John Leland (c. 1503–1552), who mentioned a house called New Inn, later named The Boothall, which provided lodging along the road to Wales. There was indeed such a house in Lewall Street, owned by members of the Richardson family in the late 18th and early 19th centuries. Lewall Street runs between High Street and Court Lane, north of Broad Street.

== Geography ==
Situated only 3 miles (5 km) east of the Herefordshire border, Newent is on the northern edge of the Forest of Dean, within the Forest of Dean District of Gloucestershire. and south-east of the River Wye. The river was connected via Newent to Gloucester in the late 18th century by the 34-mile Herefordshire and Gloucestershire Canal.

== History ==
=== Romano-British period ===
A Roman road was laid between Newent and Ariconium, near what is now Ross-on-Wye. Within 1 mile (1.6 km) of Newent, there were several metal-working sites used by the Romans. Further evidence of Romano-British settlement occurs at 56 sites within 6 miles (9.7 km) of the town. Archaeological finds there include Roman coins and pottery near the town itself, Roman coins and treasure at Little Gorsley, and a settlement at Dymock.

=== Medieval period ===
The priory established in Newent was a cell of Cormeilles Abbey, founded in Normandy in 1060 by William FitzOsbern, 1st Earl of Hereford. The abbey received an endowment from him that included the manor of Newent and surrounding woods, the church and its income, and other property he owned in England. The once Benedictine priory became part of the college of Fotheringhay after the suppression of alien priories during the Hundred Years' War with France. Its site is now occupied by the Court House, adjacent to the parish church.

The Domesday Book records that in 1066 the lord of Noemt (Newent) had been Edward the Confessor. Twenty years later the tenant-in-chief and one of the lords was Cormeilles Abbey. Other lords were Durand of Gloucester (brother of Roger de Pitres) and William son of Baderon (William fitzBaderon).

Newent, with 34.5 households, was located within the Botloe Hundred of Gloucestershire. There were 10 villagers, 19 smallholders, four serfs and one reeve. There were also four lord's plough teams, 19 men's plough teams, and three mills.

Henry III approved an annual fair in 1226 and additionally allowed for a weekly market, which began in 1253. The town still has a half-timbered market house.

=== St Mary's ===
The Church of England Church of the Blessed Virgin Mary is a Grade I listed building located in Church Street. It dates from the 13th century, but the site had been occupied since the Anglo-Saxon period.

The important 9th-century Newent Cross, which was found buried in the churchyard in 1907, now stands in the porch of the church, and has Old Testament scenes carved on three sides of the shaft: the Fall of Adam and Eve, David killing Goliath, and Abraham sacrificing his son Isaac; the fourth panel shows birds and animals.

St Mary's church has stained glass windows from the famed company of Clayton and Bell. Set on a 65 feet (20 m) tower with a ring of eight bells is an 88 feet (27 m) spire. The church organ was built in 1737 by Thomas Warne, a resident of the town.

=== 19th century ===
In 1848, Newent had a population of 3,099, of whom 1,454 people lived in the town itself. This was fewer than in earlier periods. There were mineral springs near the canal.

The Herefordshire and Gloucestershire Canal between Gloucester and Ledbury closed on 30 June 1881 and the section between Ledbury and Gloucester was converted into a railway line. The line opened on 27 July 1885 as a branch of the Great Western Railway. It closed in 1959, but the canal is now being restored.)

=== Survivals ===
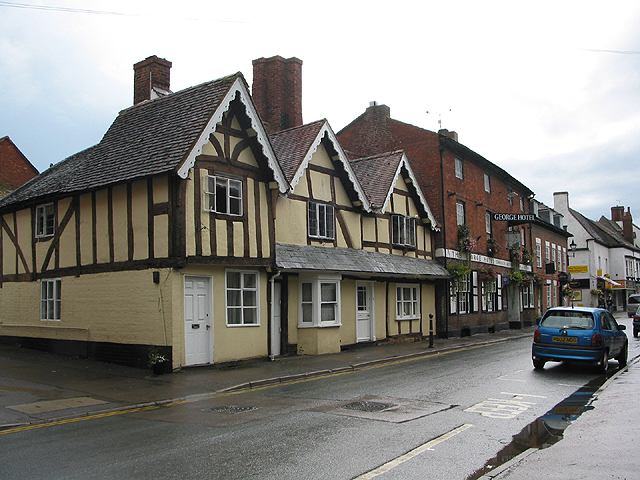
Church Street, Newent

Newent's many historical buildings include a stilted Market House and several other black-and-white, half-timbered buildings typical of Gloucestershire and Herefordshire. Behind Church Street, an erstwhile museum of Victorian life called the Shambles took the form of a replica 19th-century street. The shops are now occupied by real traders.

Historic England lists over 50 town-centre buildings and monuments, including most of Church Street and the Devonia in High Street, a Grade II-listed house of the Georgian period. The early 18th-century Court House, standing in a small park by the parish church, occupies the site of the ancient priory and is reputed to contain its foundations. Its historic features include a fine Rococo plaster ceiling and several completely panelled rooms. It was restored by R. V. Morris, Chairman of Gloucester Civic Trust.

== Transport ==
The nearest railway station is 9 miles (14.5 km) away at Ledbury on the Cotswold Line; Gloucester is 10 miles (16.1 km) away, on the Gloucester–Newport line and also has services to Birmingham, Bristol and London. Bus routes through the town connect it to Ross, Ledbury and Gloucester, such as the 32 to Gloucester, which also serves Ross-on-Wye twice a day to transport students to and from John Kyrle High School.

The "Daffodil Line" service 232, operated by DRM Bus, runs between Ross-on-Wye and Ledbury via Newent, serving those parts of the 32 and 132 no longer operated by Stagecoach West.

There are also "market day" services to Hereford operated by Nick Maddy Coaches. These run one return trip on Wednesdays (457) and Saturdays (456).|

Newent used to be served by Newent railway station on the Ledbury and Gloucester Railway, which opened in 1885, opposite what is now the fire station. It was closed to passengers in 1959 and for freight traffic in 1964. The buttresses of the Station Bridge can be seen in Old Station Road.

== Outdoor attractions ==
Newent is near a National Birds of Prey Centre, just east of the neighbouring village of Cliffords Mesne, and a vineyard, the Three Choirs. It is at the centre of the Golden Triangle, so-called after the daffodils in the surrounding area. The village is also close to May Hill a key wildlife site (KWS).

The town's Onion Fayre included competitions for growing onions and for eating them. It dated from 1996 as a revival of an agricultural fair suspended about the time of World War I. It claimed to be Gloucestershire's largest free, one-day festival, with up to 15,000 visitors on the second Saturday in September. The fair was cancelled in 2022 after being unable to restore support after it was not held for two years because of the COVID-19 pandemic.

== The arts ==
The town is home to an orchestra, founded in 1940, a choral society, and several other amateur musical and performing groups.

Traditionally, May Day was celebrated by morris dancing on the summit of nearby May Hill at dawn, after which the dancers would process into Newent. Between 2007 and 2014, a Joe Meek festival was held in venues around the town. Artist Paul Nash took a collection of photographs around Carswalls Farm, Upleadon, Newent in the late 1930s or early 1940s that are held in the archives of the Tate.

== Education ==
Education commissioners in the reign of Edward VI (1547–53) noted the lack of schooling in Newent, then a market town with over 500 inhabitants, but "all the youth of a great distance there hence rudely brought up and in no manner of knowledge and learning, where were a place meet to... erect a school for the better and more godly bringing up of the same youth." Today's Newent has three schools, two of them federated, all within the town. The federated Glebe Infant School and Picklenash Junior School provides primary education. Newent Community School offers secondary and tertiary education to those aged 11 and up.

== Media ==
Local news and television programmes are provided by BBC West Midlands and ITV Central. Television signals are received from the Ridge Hill TV transmitter.

The town is served by both BBC Hereford & Worcester and BBC Radio Gloucestershire. Other radio stations including Heart West, Greatest Hits Radio South West, and Dean Radio, a community radio station with broadcast to the Forest of Dean.

The town's local newspaper is The Forester.

== Sports and recreation ==
- The town's football team, Newent Town AFC, plays in the Hellenic League System. It was promoted as Champions of the North Gloucester Premier League after winning the title on 14 May 2013. Newent Town also won the Northern Senior "Reg Davis" League Cup in 2015/2016 and 2016/2017. It then won the Hellenic Div 2 West at its first attempt in the 2017/2018 season. Its reserve team plays in the Hellenic League 2 West. There is a third team which plays in the North Gloucester League. At youth level, the Under 16s won the Cheltenham top division without losing a game in the 2016/2017 season. In the 2018/2019 season there were only Under 18s. The home pitch and club house are at Wildsmith Meadow.
- Newent RFC plays Rugby Union in the Gloucester Premier Division of the Rugby Football Union South West Division and is based at the recreation ground in Watery Lane. It was promoted as Champions of Division 1 on 22 April 2013.
- Newent Cricket Club plays in the Gloucestershire County Cricket League, Division 2. The club is located at Three Ashes Lane, just outside Newent.
- Newent Leisure Centre is run by the Forest of Dean District Council within the grounds of Newent Community School. Its facilities include a gym, a multi-use indoor arena, a squash court and a swimming pool, along with tennis courts and an all-weather, artificial turf pitch for football and hockey. These are run by the adjacent Sports Bar.

== Notable people ==
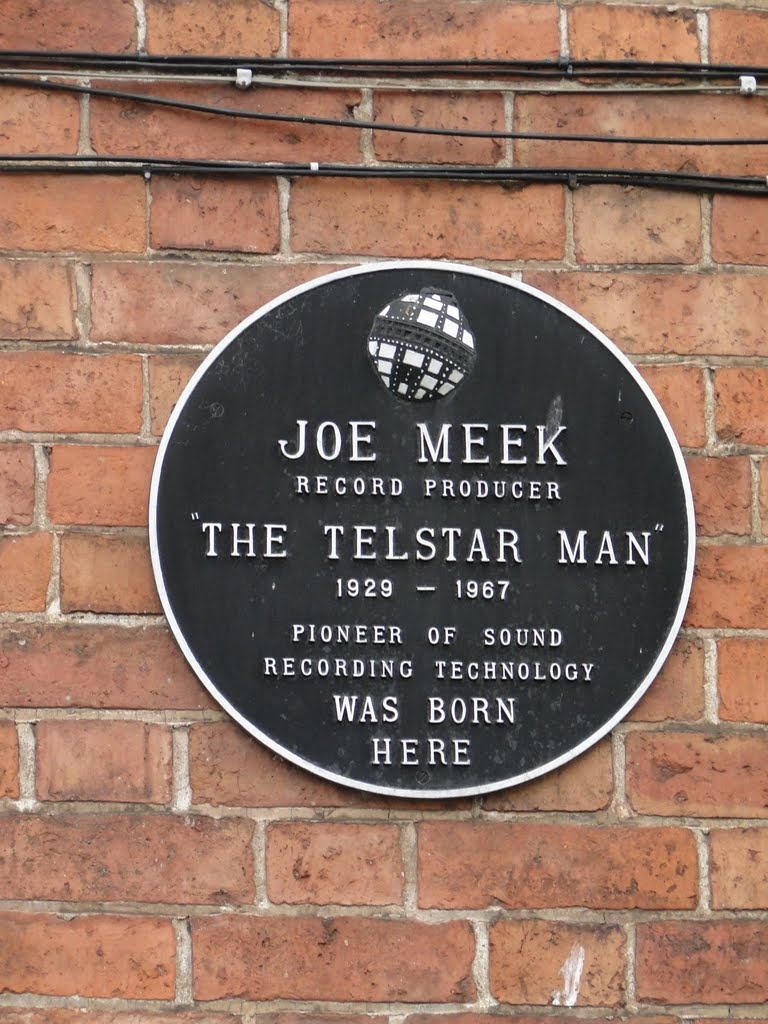
This first Joe Meek plaque at 1 Market Square was replaced by an official blue plaque in 2011

- Ian Kenneth Bailey (1957-2024) – former local journalist convicted and sentenced in France (in absentia) for the 1996 murder of Sophie Toscan du Plantier in Ireland was resident in the town earlier in his life.
- Rutland Boughton – English composer – lived for much of his life at a house called Bevan's Hill, Kilcot, near Newent
- Alex Cuthbert – the Wales rugby star – went to Newent Community School. He scored the decisive try in the 2012 Six Nations game, and two tries in the 30–3 win over England in the 2013 title-deciding game. Cuthbert was raised and schooled in England but was given his chance in international rugby by the Welsh Sevens team, after being overlooked by the England set-up.
- Charlotte Dujardin – Gold Medal Winner in the Team Dressage and Individual Dressage events at the 2012 Summer Olympics in London – is based at Newent.
- Stuart Fleetwood – a professional footballer currently playing for Luton Town F.C. – attended Newent Community School and played for various Newent Youth Football teams. Fleetwood previously played for Cardiff and represented Wales at U21 and U23 levels.
- Andi Gladwin – well-known magician who went to Newent Community School – has featured on Penn & Teller: Fool Us, Next Great Magician, Masters of Illusion and other shows. Gladwin is the author of several books on magic.
- Carl Hester – Gold Medal Winner in the Team Dressage and Individual Dressage events at the 2012 Summer Olympics in London – is based at Newent.
- Vicky Holland – World Triathlon Champion 2018 – went to Newent Community School. She became the only female Triathlon Olympic medal winner (Bronze 2016). She is a twice World Mixed Team Champion.
- John Lightfoot (1735–1788), parson-naturalist, conchologist and botanist, was born in Newent.
- Joe Meek – record producer and songwriter – was born at 1 Market Square. He produced the 1962 number 1 hit 'Telstar' by The Tornados. He is buried at Newent Cemetery under a black granite tombstone.
- Michael Steven Park (1966-2005) – a rally co-driver, one of the top co-drivers of his generation – died as a result of injuries sustained in an accident on the final leg of Wales Rally Great Britain, when his Peugeot 307 WRC left the road and struck a tree. As co-driver to Estonian Markko Märtin, he enjoyed considerable success for three seasons at Ford before joining Peugeot for 2005.
