= Puddlebrook Quarry =

Site of Special Scientific Interest in Gloucestershire

- Site of Special Scientific Interest
- Location within Gloucestershire
- Location of Puddlebrook Quarry.
- Area of search: Gloucestershire
- Grid reference: SO646183
- Coordinates: 51.862604°N 2.514748°W
- Interest: Geological
- Area: 0.7 ha (1.7 acres)
- Notification date: 1986

Puddlebrook Quarry (grid reference SO646183) is a 0.7-hectare (1.7-acre) geological Site of Special Scientific Interest in Gloucestershire, near Drybrook notified in 1986. The site is listed in the 'Forest of Dean Local Plan Review' as a Key Wildlife Site (KWS).

The Quarry is north of Mitcheldean Meend Marsh which is a nature reserve.

== Location and geology ==
The site is on the northern side of the Forest of Dean and provides a unique exposure of the basal strata of the Westphalian Series of the Upper Carboniferous period. The conglomerates exposed differ significantly from the sandy beds of the same age of the southern area of the Forest of Dean. This demonstrates the uplift to the early Westphalian and is important for geological understanding of the development of the Coalfield of the area.

Lower Carboniferous Drybrook Sandstone lies under the conglomerates and there is a significant collection of late Dinantian fossil plants visible (ten different species). One of the oldest known mosses is present (Muscites plumatus). Some species are common with the contemporary Lower Brown Limestone and Lower Oil Shales floras.

The quarry is nationally important for research in the distribution of Lower Carboniferous plants. It provides early evolutionary information on mosses, lycopods and pteriodosperms.

== SSSI Source ==
- Natural England SSSI information on the citation
- Natural England SSSI information on the Puddlebrook Quarry unit
