= Harrow Hill, Gloucestershire =

Village in Gloucestershire, England

Coordinates: 51.849°N 2.513°W

Harrow Hill
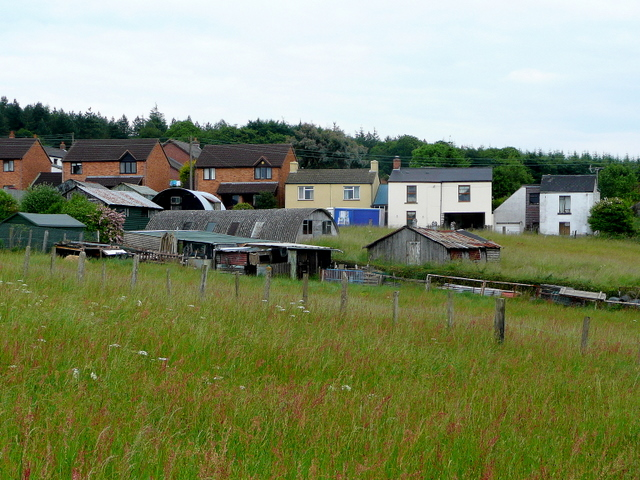
- Cottages at Harrow Hill

- Location within Gloucestershire
- OS grid reference: SO621175
- District: Forest of Dean
- Shire county: Gloucestershire
- Region: South West
- Country: England
- Sovereign state: United Kingdom
- Post town: Drybrook
- Postcode district: GL17
- Dialling code: 01594
- Police: Gloucestershire
- Fire: Gloucestershire
- Ambulance: South Western
- UK Parliament: Forest of Dean

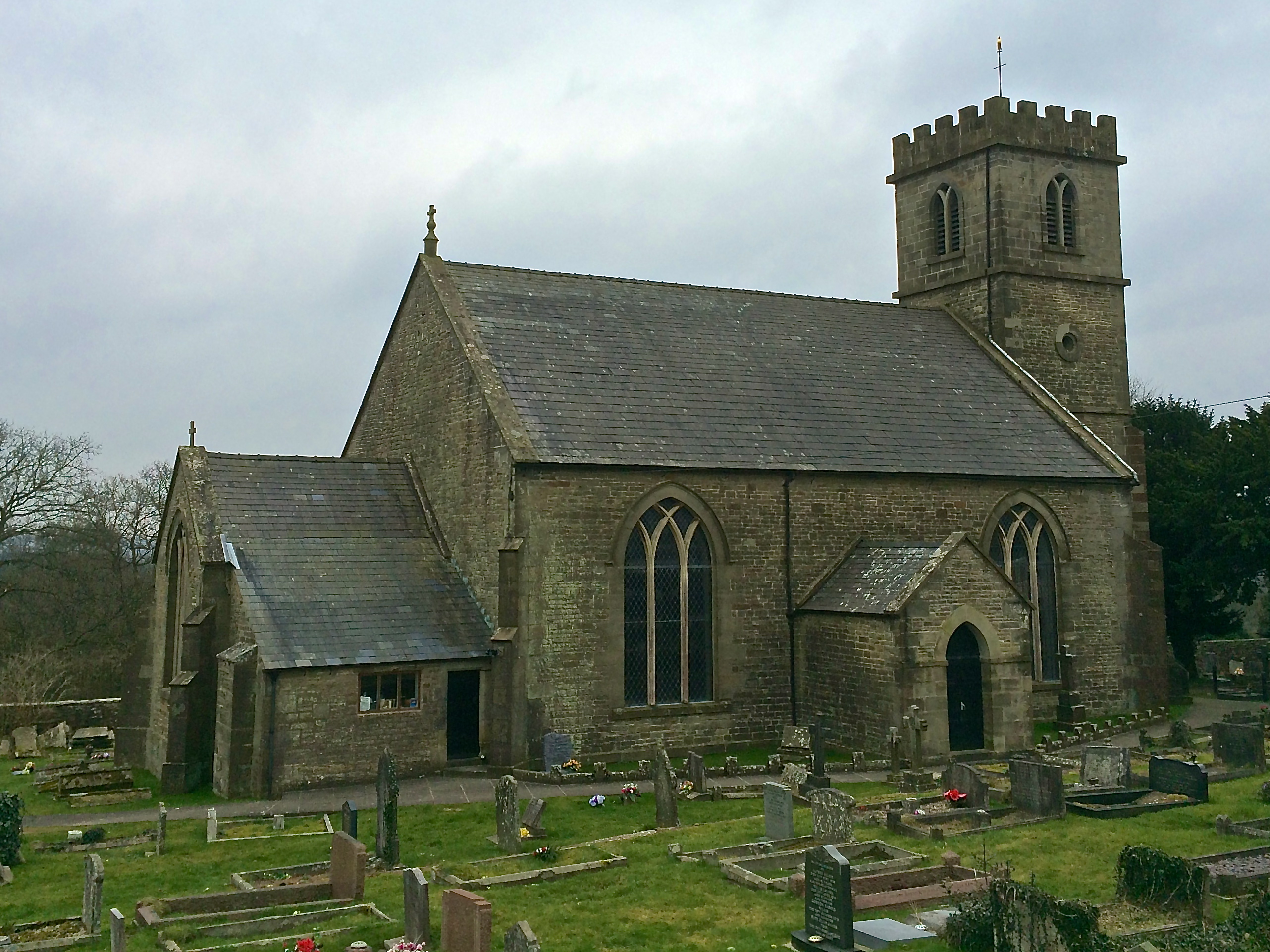
Holy Trinity Church, Harrow Hill

Harrow Hill is a village situated in the Forest of Dean in Gloucestershire, England. It is contiguous with the larger village of Drybrook. Originally, the village was known as Harry Hill. "Until fairly recently the village was once called Harry Hill"

The Harrow Hill church, Holy Trinity, was opened in 1817, and is known as The Forest Church. The village has its own football club, Harrow Hill F.C.

The main route that bisects the village is Trinity Road. This links the village to Drybrook and the A4136 (Gloucester to Monmouth). At the halfway point of the road stands a battle weary red telephone box, which is sadly in a state of neglect. From here, there are good views across the valley to Ruardean Hill.

The Football club can be found at the end of Larksfield Road, and is easily located by the floodlight towers that stand on the corners of the main pitch (a further pitch is located adjacent to the car park).
