= Bridstow =

Village and parish in Herefordshire, England

Coordinates: 51.920°N 2.605°W

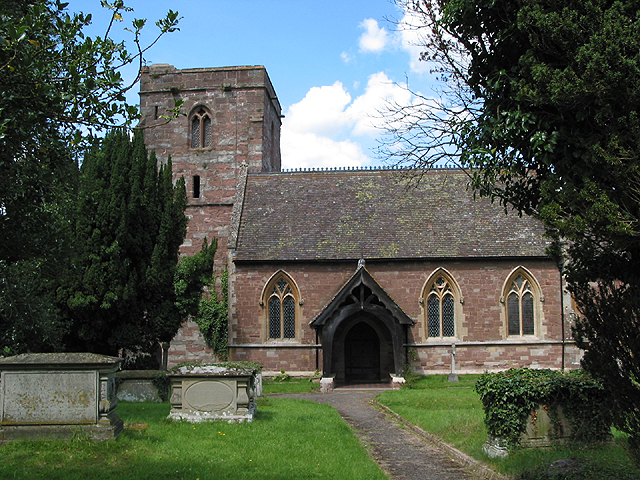
- St Bridget's Church, Bridstow

- Location within Herefordshire
- Population: 859 (Parish)
- OS grid reference: SO 583247
- Unitary authority: Herefordshire
- Ceremonial county: Herefordshire
- Region: West Midlands
- Country: England
- Sovereign state: United Kingdom
- Post town: ROSS-ON-WYE
- Postcode district: HR9
- Dialling code: 01989
- Police: West Mercia
- Fire: Hereford and Worcester
- Ambulance: West Midlands
- UK Parliament: Hereford and South Herefordshire

Bridstow is a village and civil parish in Herefordshire, England, 2 km (1.2 miles) west of Ross-on-Wye and 17 km (10.6 miles) south-east of Hereford. The parish is bounded to the east and south by the River Wye. The A40 road linking the M50 motorway to South Wales runs through the parish, crossing the Wye at Bridstow Bridge. The parish had a population of 906 in the 2011 UK census, and an estimated population of 941 in 2018.

== Heritage ==
The largest village in the parish is Wilton, site of the Grade I listed Wilton Castle and Wilton Bridge. The Liber Llandavensis (Book of Llandaff) records that in 1066, Herewald, Bishop of Llandaff, appointed Guollguinn as priest there.

Wilton (as Wiltone) and Ashe Ingen (as Ascis) appear in the 1086 Domesday Book.

The parish church, dedicated to St Bridget, has a tower in the Perpendicular style. The rest of the exterior was rebuilt in 1862 to a design by Thomas Nicholson. The stained glass is by Charles Kempe.

=== 1870s ===
Published in 1870–1872, John Marius Wilson's Imperial Gazetteer of England and Wales describes Bridstow as "a parish in Ross district, Hereford; on the River Wye, adjacent to the Monmouth and Hereford railway, 1 mile W by N of Ross. Post Town, Ross. Acres, 2,199. Real property, £5,506. Pop., 717. Houses, 143. Wilton Castle here is an old seat of the Lords Grey de Wilton, burnt in the Civil Wars, and now an ivy-clad ruin. The living is a vicarage in the Diocese of Hereford. Value, £276.* (Note: The asterisk (*) throughout the Gazetteer signifies a habitable glebe-house.) Patron, the Bishop of Hereford.

== Amenities ==
Bridstow CE Primary School is a Voluntary Aided Church of England co-educational school for pupils between 4 and 11 years old. In May 2016, the school entered into a "soft federation" agreement with the school at Brampton Abbotts, under which the two schools share a principal and some other functions.

Retail, medical and other facilities are available at Ross-on-Wye (1½ miles, 2.5 km). Accommodation is available at Bridstow Guest House, a converted Victorian house. The village also has a village hall.

== Transport ==
Bridstow has daytime bus services towards Gloucester and Hereford. The nearest mainline railway stations are at Hereford (14 miles, 23 km) and Gloucester (18 miles, 29 km).

The A49 and A40 pass nearby, with links to the M50 motorway.
