= Brierley, Gloucestershire =

Village in Gloucestershire, England

Coordinates: 51.83324°N 2.54562°W

Brierley
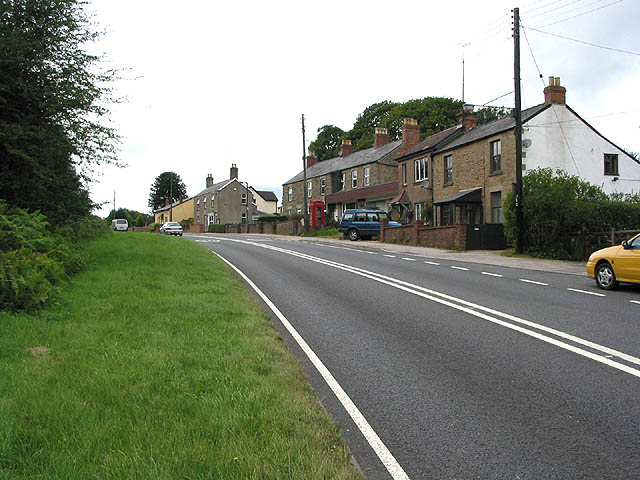
- A4136 through Brierley (September 2007)

- Location within Gloucestershire
- OS grid reference: SO625151
- District: Forest of Dean
- Shire county: Gloucestershire
- Region: South West
- Country: England
- Sovereign state: United Kingdom
- Post town: DRYBROOK
- Postcode district: GL17
- Dialling code: 01594
- Police: Gloucestershire
- Fire: Gloucestershire
- Ambulance: South Western
- UK Parliament: Forest of Dean

Brierley is a village in the Forest of Dean, Gloucestershire, United Kingdom. It has one petrol station and a shop, the former owned by BP and the latter by Londis.

Brierley was the birthplace of Winifred Foley (25 July 1914 – 21 March 2009) author of the autobiographical A Child in the Forest (1974), and other later works including No Pipe Dreams for Father (1977). The village was also the birthplace of her father, Charlie Mason, who led the hunger march to the workhouse of Westbury during the pit strikes of May 1926.

== Nearest places ==
- Ruardean Woodside
- Ruardean Hill
- Lydbrook
- The Pludds
