= Natasha Hunt =

England international rugby union player

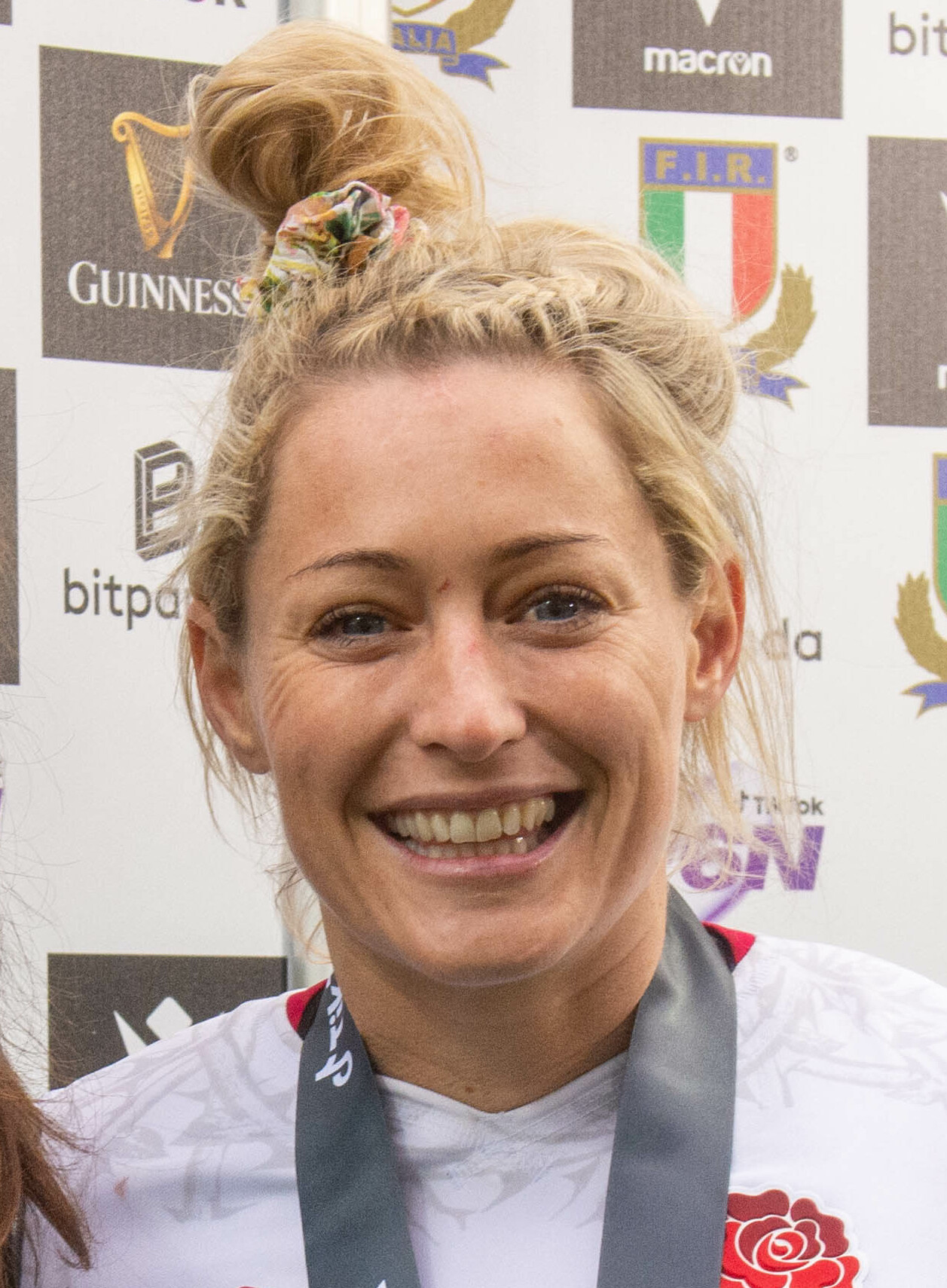
- Hunt with England in 2022
- Born: 21 March 1989 (age 37) Gloucester, Gloucestershire, England
- Height: 1.65 m (5 ft 5 in)
- Weight: 67 kg (148 lb)
- School: Dene Magna School
- Occupation(s): International Rugby Player, Teacher

Rugby union career
- Position: Scrum-half
- Current team: Gloucester-Hartpury
Senior career
Years	Team	Apps	(Points)
	Malvern		(0)
	Bath		(0)
	Bristol		(0)
2013–2018	Lichfield		(0)
2018–	Gloucester-Hartpury	103	(0)
International career
Years	Team	Apps	(Points)
2011–	England	91	(71)
2023	Barbarians		
National sevens teams
Years	Team		Comps
2016–2018	England		
2016–2020	Great Britain		
Medal record
Representing England
Women's rugby sevens
Commonwealth Games
Bronze medal – third place	2018 Gold Coast	Team competition
Women's rugby union
Rugby World Cup
Gold medal – first place	2025 England	Team competition
Gold medal – first place	2014 France	Team competition
Silver medal – second place	2017 Ireland	Team competition

Natasha May "Mo" Hunt (born 21 March 1989) is an English rugby union player who plays scrum-half for Gloucester-Hartpury and for England. She is also a qualified teacher.

== Personal life ==
Hunt attended Dene Magna School.

Hunt is a qualified teacher and previously trained at King Edward's School Birmingham in PE, before teaching at Sir Graham Balfour School in Stafford, also as a PE teacher. Hunt communicates with fans via the use of Twitter and her inspirations in rugby are the former England Women's captain Sue Day and Susie Appleby.

== England ==
Hunt has represented England Under 20s, England A, England sevens as well as the England women's national rugby union team. Hunt played for England in the RBS 6 Nations as well as in the rugby 7s world tournament, winning both.

In 2014, Hunt made several appearances for England Women, helping them achieve their second world title and earning a professional contract in the process.

She was named in the squad for the 2017 Women's Rugby World Cup in Ireland. She was in the starting team for the World Cup final 2017. Hunt played in the starting line up in the Women's Six Nation's Squad against Scotland, winning 80–0. The team finished the tournament as Grand Slam champions 2019.

She was called into the Red Roses side for the 2025 Six Nations Championship on 17 March. She was named in England's squad for the Women's Rugby World Cup.

== Honours ==
- RBS 6 Nations Rugby Women's winner 2012
- Women's rugby 7s world tournament winner
- 2014 Women's Rugby World Cup
- Allianz Premier 15s Champion 2022/23
- Premiership Women's Rugby Champion 2023–24
- Premiership Women's Rugby Champions 2024–25
- 2025 Women's Rugby World Cup
