= Cliffords Mesne =

Village in Gloucestershire, England

Coordinates: 51°54′N 2°26′W

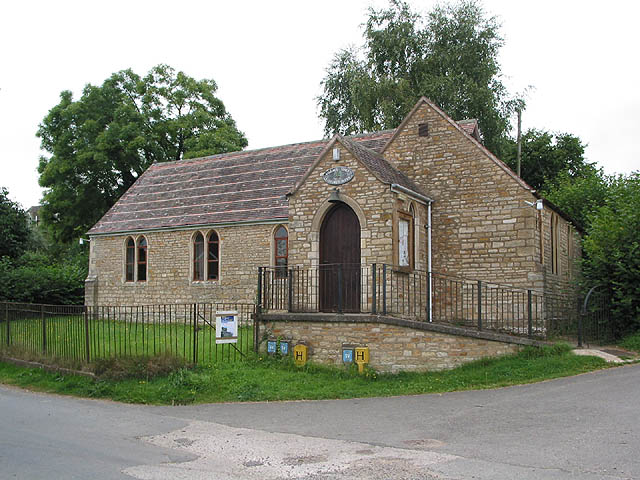
Cliffords Mesne Village Hall

Cliffords Mesne (Clifford's Mesne on some maps) is an English village in Gloucestershire, in Newent civil parish, two miles (3.2 km) south-west of the town. The village became the home of the autobiographical author Winifred Foley from the mid-1970s, after the success of her first book of Gloucestershire reminiscences, A Child in the Forest.

== Facilities ==
Cliffords Mesne possessed a public house, the Yew Tree Inn (now closed). The village is close to May Hill, which is owned by the National Trust, and to the now-closed-to-the-public International Centre for Birds of Prey. The village hall was refurbished in 2013 and holds regular social and musical events.

== Heritage ==
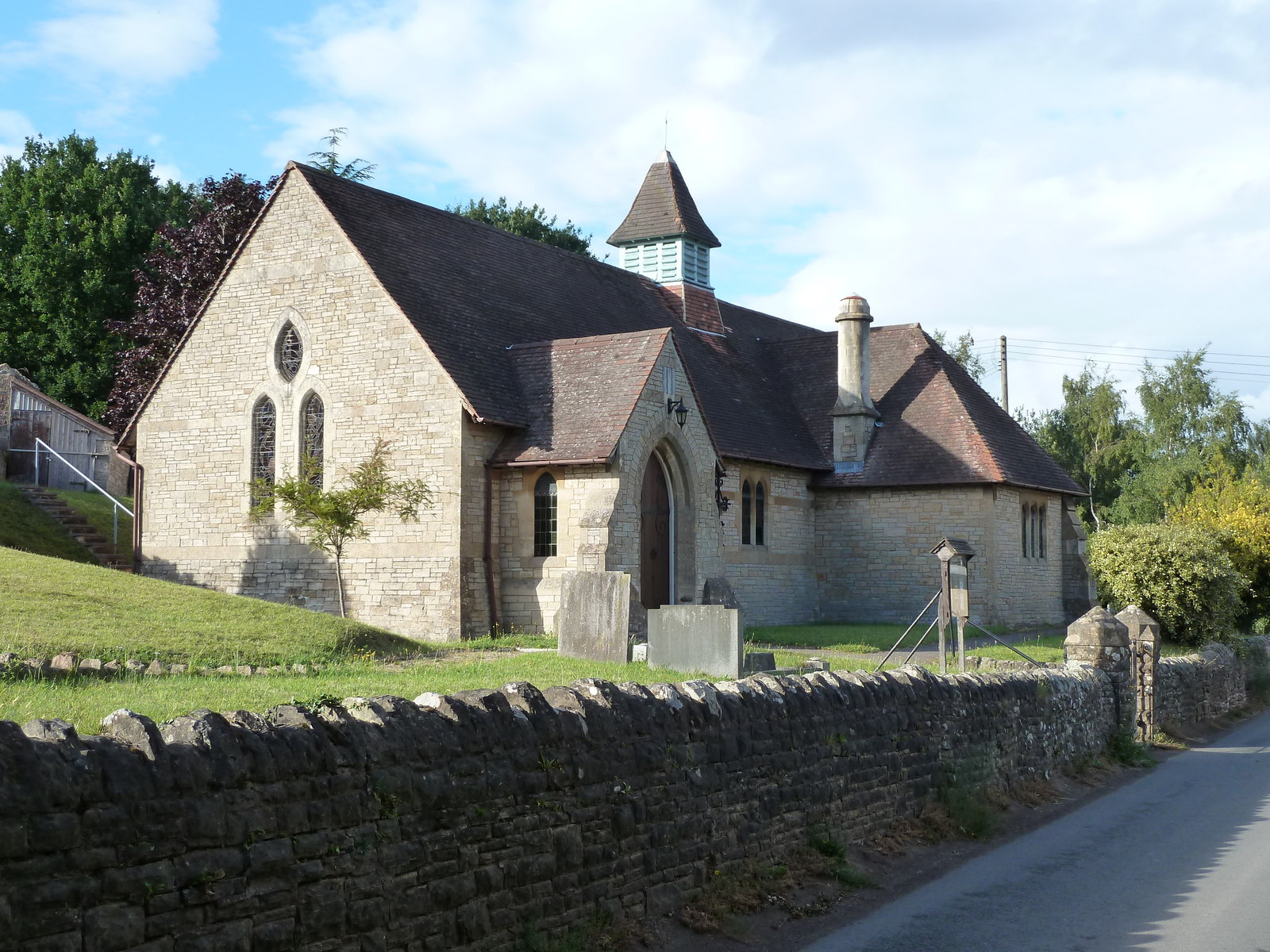
St Peter's Church

The small Anglican church is dedicated to St Peter. Designed by E. S. Harris, it was built in 1882 of stone, with a central bellcote, a nave, a chancel, a south porch and a south vestry. It has contemporary stained glass dedicated to a local falconer and a memorial tablet to two local men who died on active service in the Second World War. The church parish is merged with Gorsley. It shares clergy with the benefice of Newent and lies in the Diocese of Gloucester.

An earlier stone church, built in Gothic style in 1872 and extended in 1877, became the village school, which is now closed. The building serves as a non-denominational village hall.

Two outlying buildings are Grade II listed: Ravenshill Farmhouse, north of the village, most of which dates from the late 17th and early 18th centuries; and an 18th-century cider house at Hay Farm, south-west of the village.

The combined population of Cliffords Mesne and Gorsley was 1320 in 1876.
