= Wilton Castle =

Castle in Herefordshire, England

- Herefordshire, England
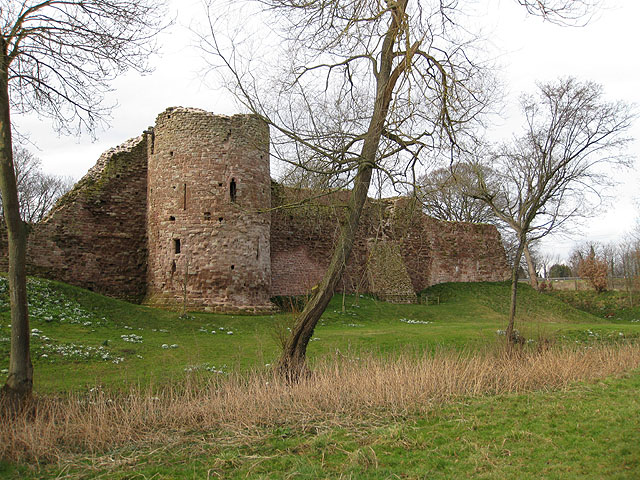

Site information
- Condition: Still standing, mostly to battlement height

Location
- Shown within Herefordshire
- Location within Herefordshire
- Coordinates: 51°54′58″N 2°35′48″W

Site history
- Materials: Stone

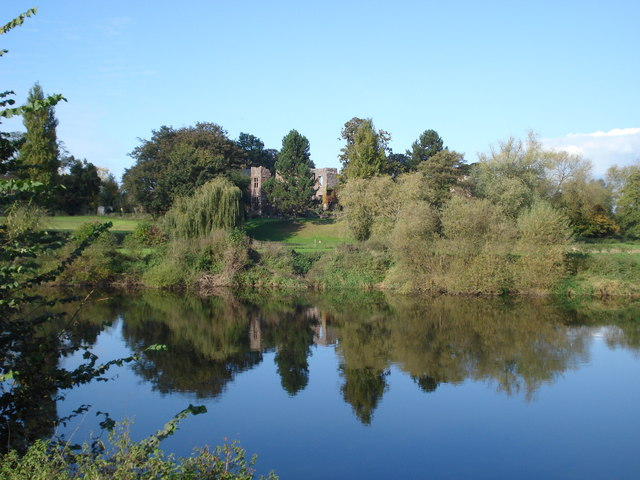
Wilton Castle.

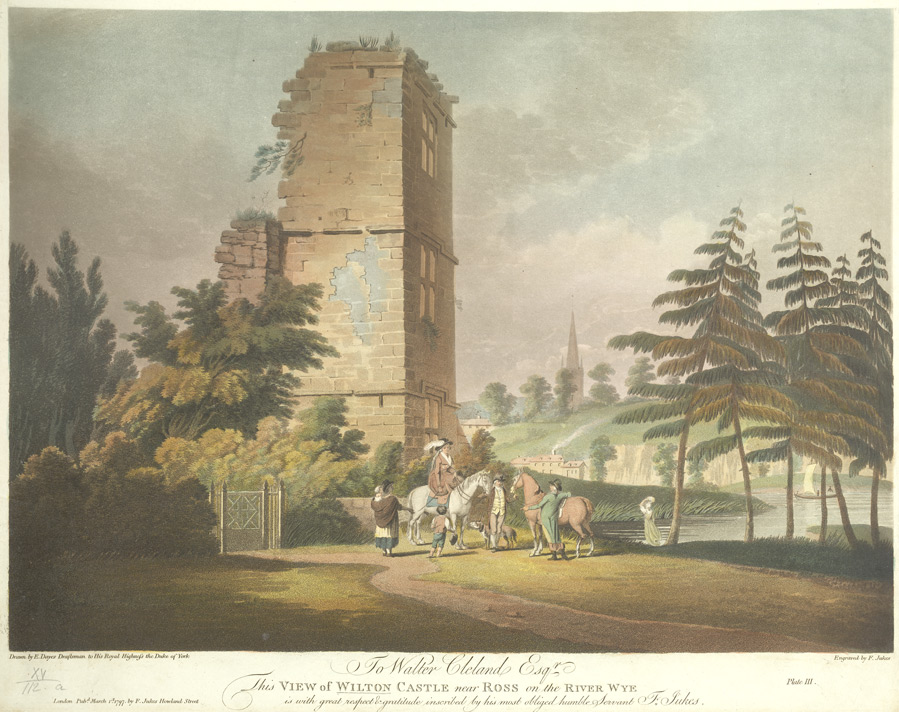
A painting of Wilton Castle by E. Dayes, dated at 1797

Wilton Castle is a 12th-century Norman castle located in south-eastern Herefordshire, England on the River Wye adjacent to the town of Ross-on-Wye. The castle is named after the manor associated with it.

This castle in Herefordshire, still standing mostly to battlement height, remains a monument to its former lords. The Longchamps of Wilton in their time provided Bailiffs of Normandy, Chancellors of England, sheriffs of Hereford and the Welsh Marches and enemies of King John.

They were succeeded by the families of De Cantilupe (see Thomas de Cantilupe and links) and De Grey who between them built up a powerbase in Wales and the Marches. Matilda de Grey, née de Cantilupe, declared untruthfully in court in 1292 to King Edward I of England that the castle had been built by her Longchamp ancestors in the days of Edward the Confessor (1042–66). In fact, the castle could not have been built before 1154 and certainly the 'barony' never held the Marcher Lord rights Lady Matilda claimed for it.

The castle was primarily associated with a branch of the Norman-descended family of Grey, the Barons Grey of Wilton, a prominent dynasty of Norman Marcher Lords in the Welsh Marches, who held it from 1308 or before. The castle passed from the family when William Grey was captured by the French at the end of the defence of Guînes in 1557, and was forced to sell the castle to raise funds for his ransom.

The castle was finally destroyed in the English Civil War by troops led by local Royalist Barnabas Scudamore, a period that saw skirmishes and sieges locally at Goodrich Castle, Ruardyn Castle and Raglan Castle.
