= Mitcheldean Town Hall =

Municipal building in Mitcheldean, Gloucestershire, England

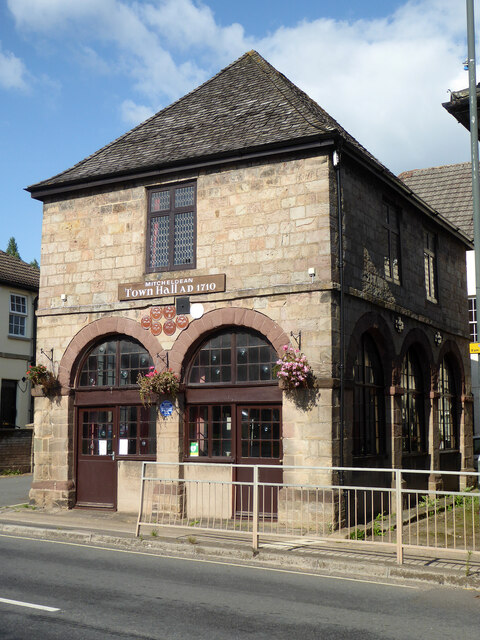
- Mitcheldean Town Hall

- Shown in Gloucestershire
- 51.8661°N 2.4890°W
- Location: High Street, Mitcheldean

History
- Built: 1710

Site notes
- Architectural style: Neoclassical style

Listed Building – Grade II
- Official name: Old Town Hall
- Designated: 23 September 1955
- Reference no.: 1299149

Mitcheldean Town Hall is a municipal building in the High Street in Mitcheldean, Gloucestershire, England. The structure, which operates as the offices and meeting place of Mitcheldean Town Council, is a Grade II listed building.

== History ==
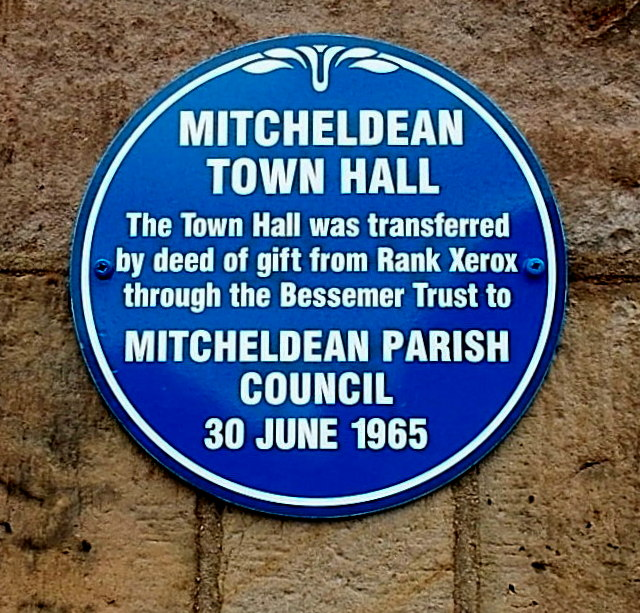
Plaque on the front of the building

An earlier covered market, originally known as the chipping cross, occupied the current site and dated back at least to the early 16th century. It was used, inter alia, as a corn exchange and, in the 17th century, the tolls were allocated to one of the two local lords of the manor, the Roberts family or the Colchester family, according to which side of the market house the corn was pitched. By the late 17th century, the market house had become dilapidated and one of the lords of the manor, to whom the Roberts family interest had passed, was prosecuted in his own manorial court, for failing to keep the building in good order.

A new building was therefore commissioned in the early 18th century. It was designed in the neoclassical style, built in ashlar stone and was completed in 1710. The building was arcaded on the ground floor, so that markets could continue to be held, with an assembly room on the first floor. On the main frontage facing the High Street there were two arches, and on the side elevations, there were three arches, all formed by stone pilasters supporting red brick voussoirs. The first floor was fenestrated by one cross-window on the High Street frontage and by two cross-windows on the side elevations. There was originally an external staircase leading up to a first floor doorway at the back of the southern side elevation, but this was later removed.

The building was rebuilt at the expense of the Colchester family in the 1760s, and converted into a town hall in 1861. A mechanics' institute with a reading room was established on the first floor in 1885. After a local club for young men, formed in 1904, moved into the building, the arches were filled in to accommodate the club in 1920.

The building was briefly used as an office by Wintles' Forest Brewery, which operated close by in Brook Street, and then passed to British Acoustic Films when that company took over the brewery site in 1940 during the Second World War. British Acoustic Films was acquired by the Rank Organisation in 1948 and then became part of a joint venture between the Rank Organisation and Xerox, formed to make photocopiers and known as Rank Xerox, in June 1956. Rank Xerox donated the building, with financial support from the Bessemer Trust, to Mitcheldean Parish Council in 1965. It was subsequently used by the parish council as its offices and meeting place.

A museum of Xerox photocopiers was established on the ground floor of the town hall in February 2003, and the items displayed were expanded to include all aspects of the development of the factory site, from a brewery to a photocopier factory, in December 2017.
