= Winifred Foley =

Autobiographer from Gloucestershire, England

- Born: 25 July 1914; Brierley, Gloucestershire
- Died: 21 March 2009 (aged 94); Cheltenham
- Spouse: Sydney Foley

Winifred Mary Foley (born Winifred Mason; 25 July 1914 – 21 March 2009) was an English writer. She is known best for an autobiographical account of her childhood in the Forest of Dean: A Child in the Forest (1974).

== Forest life ==
Winifred Foley, the daughter of Charles Mason, a coal miner and his Welsh wife Margaret, was born in Brierley, Gloucestershire. Her book, A Child in the Forest (1974), mainly an account of her childhood in the Forest of Dean, also includes her experiences as an adolescent domestic servant in London and elsewhere, up to the point where she meets her future husband, Sydney (died 1998), at an anti-fascist rally in 1936.

The book has been compared with Laurie Lee's Cider with Rosie, but there are some differences, e.g. Foley makes clear the grinding poverty of her childhood. Its success was somewhat disconcerting for her: "I think I come out of it as a very ordinary little girl, with all the usual faults," she said. "I wouldn't have been surprised, after it had been published, if decent people hadn't wanted to know me." Her immediate family were delighted with the book, but "the honesty of her descriptions, which included stories of fleas in the bed and poor sanitation, shamed some parts of her family."

A Child in the Forest was serialised on BBC Radio 4's Woman's Hour in 1973, and three years later one chapter from it, about a job as a domestic servant, was adapted as a TV programme, Abide With Me. A stage adaptation of the book, by David Goodland, was produced at the Swan Theatre, Worcester in 1989 and the Everyman Theatre, Cheltenham in 1991. The success of the book allowed the Foleys to move from Huntley and buy a house at Cliffords Mesne, near Newent, Gloucestershire.

Subsequent works of reminiscences included No Pipe Dreams for Father, Back to the Forest and In and Out of the Forest. She also had some romantic fiction published. Writing fiction in her old age, she said, was "the only thing that keeps me going." She moved to Cheltenham after her husband died. According to her eldest son Chris, Winifred Foley "never lost her love of the Forest, even when she moved. My mother had a very political mind and talked about a lot of things, but she never talked about anything with more affection than her days in the Forest." A documentary on her life, Winifred Foley – A Child from the Forest, was broadcast on ITV in 2001.

== Death and legacy ==
Winifred Foley died in Cheltenham on 21 March 2009, some three days before her original book was re-released under the new title Full Hearts and Empty Bellies, having reportedly sold over 500,000 copies by that time. The Humanist funeral was held at the Cheltenham Crematorium. One of the pieces of music chosen was a recording of "I'm Forever Blowing Bubbles" sung by the children of Pillowell County Primary School, which had been the signature tune of the 1973 BBC serialisation. She was survived by three sons and by a daughter. Full Hearts... was serialised in the Daily Mail and went on to reach The Times Top 10 best-seller list in the UK.

There is a bench dedicated to her memory and that of her husband on the top of May Hill, a Forest of Dean beauty spot not far from her home in Cliffords Mesne.

== Bibliography ==
=== Reminiscences ===
- A Child in the Forest (London: BBC, 1974) ISBN 0-563-12605-1; reissued 1977, 1978, 1985, 1986, 1991, and (as Full Hearts and Empty Bellies) 2009
- No Pipe Dreams for Father (Coleford: The Forest Bookshop, 1977) ISBN 0-9505926-0-9
- Back to the Forest (London: Macdonald, 1981) ISBN 0-354-04354-4; reissued 1982
- The Forest Trilogy (Oxford: Oxford University Press, 1992, reissue of previous three) ISBN 0-19-283076-7
- In and Out of the Forest (London: Century, 1984) ISBN 0-7126-0365-4; reissued 1992)
- Great Aunt Lizzie (Oxford: Isis, 2002) ISBN 0-7531-9816-9
- Shiny Pennies and Grubby Pinafores (London: Abacus, 2010) ISBN 978-0-349-12293-9

=== Fiction ===
- Village Fates (Oxford: Isis, 2000) ISBN 0-7531-6342-X
- Prejudice and Pride (Oxford: Isis, 2005) ISBN 0-7531-7224-0
- To Kill for Love (Oxford: Isis, 2006) ISBN 0-7531-7655-6
- Two Men and a Maiden (Oxford: Isis, 2007) ISBN 0-7531-7971-7
