= Newent Community School =

Coordinates: 51.9272°N 2.4116°W

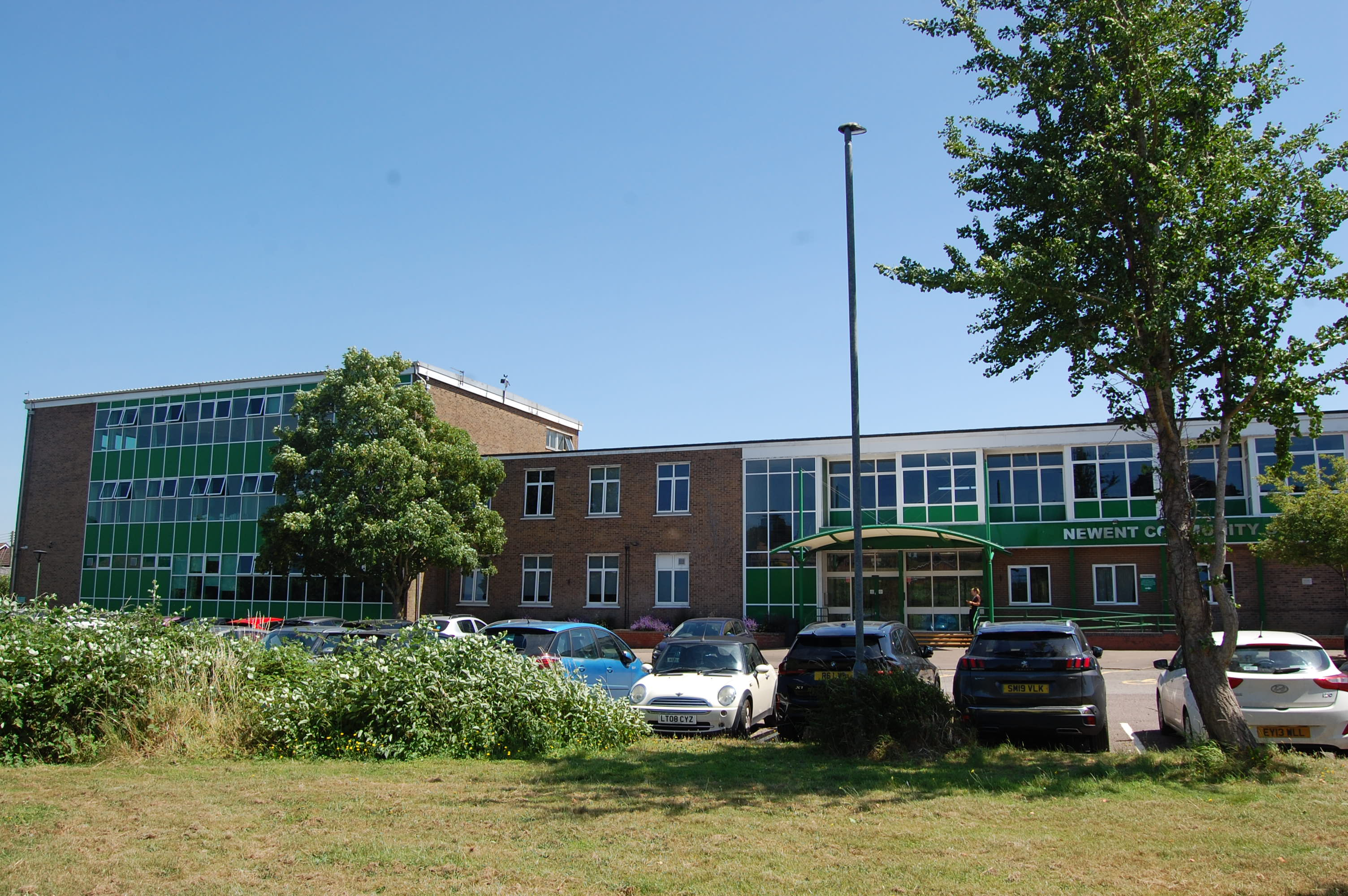

Location
- Watery Lane; Newent, Gloucestershire, GL18 1QF; England

Information
- Type: Academy
- Motto: Fidem Praesto
- Established: 1840 and 1921 (ancestor schools) 1951 (comprehensive) - moved to present site in 1965.
- Local authority: Gloucestershire
- Specialist: Arts (visual arts) and Science
- Department for Education URN: 138746 Tables
- Ofsted: Reports
- Principal: Ben Dumanye
- Gender: Coeducational
- Age: 11 to 18
- Enrolment: 1,063
- Houses: Collingwood; Mountbatten; Nelson; Sixth Form
- Colour: Green Gold
- Website: newent.gloucs.sch.uk

Newent Community School is a secondary school in Newent, Gloucestershire, England. It is an Academy of 1,063 students, serving the town, rural community and Gloucester. The school provides secondary education for ages 11 to 18. The school offers GCSEs as well as A Levels. In 2001, the school was granted Arts College specialist status. In 2007 the school was also granted Science College as a second specialism. In addition, the school has been awarded Sportsmark Silver, Artsmark Gold and Healthy School. The school became an academy in 2012.

The campus consists of 35 acres (140,000 m^{2}) which includes extensive sporting and leisure facilities, including: a floodlit all-weather pitch; sports hall; squash courts; gymnasium; fitness suite and indoor heated swimming pool - all of which are for use by the school and wider community, through Freedom Leisure.

== History ==
Newent Community School and Sixth Form Centre was Gloucestershire’s first purpose-built comprehensive school. The present building was opened in April 1965, although previously it had operated on a split site in Ross Road.

Originally there were four houses; Collingwood(blue), Mountbatten(red), Nelson (green)and Drake (yellow), but due to a low student numbers Drake was removed and only three remain.

== Eco-Lab ==
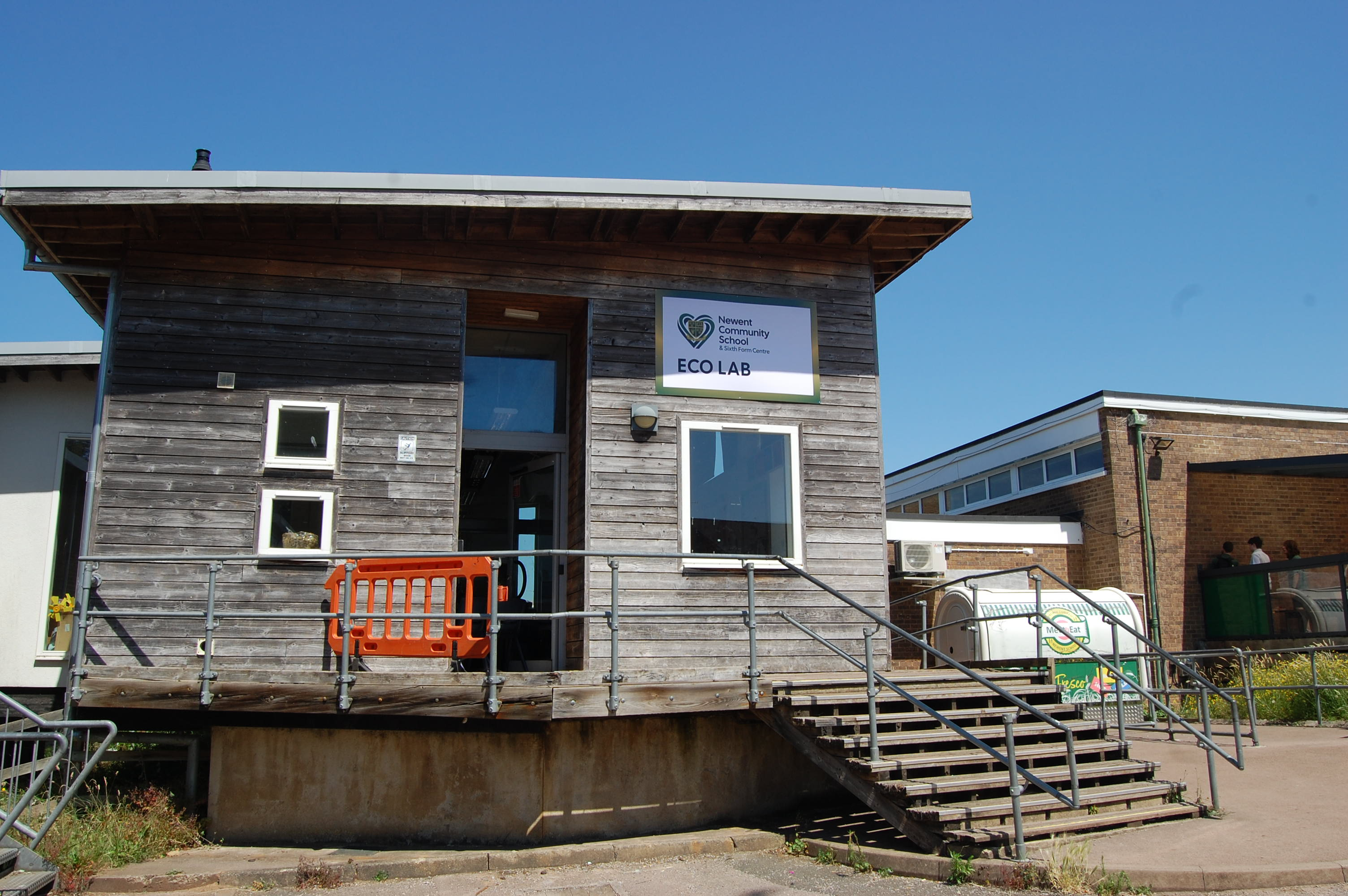
The Eco Lab in 2026

The school required a new laboratory to meet curriculum requirements and inspired by exchange visits with a school in Kenya the pupils requested that it be developed as an eco lab. The building incorporates a comprehensive range of sustainable qualities; designed for low energy use with a high performance thermal envelope locally sourced and using renewable, low maintenance materials; good levels of north daylighting linked to automatically controlled artificial lighting and underfloor heating. Energy consumption results are published in the school news network.

== Kenya student exchange ==
Newent Community School, along with two other Gloucestershire schools (Dene Magna School and Lakers School) has been involved with student exchange with St George’s Secondary School near Kisumu in Kenya for twelve years. The school maintains a strong partnership with St George's Secondary School and provides financial and educational support through the use of fundraising.

Students visited St George's in Kenya in 2004, 2006, 2009, 2011, 2013, 2015 and 2017.

== Notable former pupils ==
- Alex Cuthbert, Welsh rugby union player
- Vicky Holland, British Triathlete, Commonwealth Games Gold medallist
- Ed Leigh, TV Presenter
- Stuart Fleetwood, football player
- Joe Edwards (footballer, born 1990) Football Player
- Karen Holford, Chief Executive and Vice-Chancellor of Cranfield University, former Deputy Vice-Chancellor of Cardiff University.
