= Karen Holford =

Welsh professor

Dame Karen Holford DBE FREng FLSW FIMechE CEng
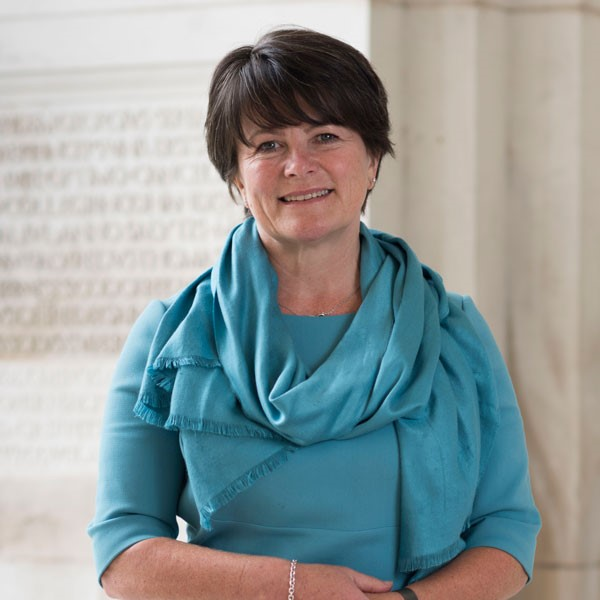
- Born: Karen Margaret Holford; 1962 (age 63–64)
- Education: Newent Comprehensive School
- Alma mater: University of Wales Institute of Science and Technology (BEng); University College, Cardiff (PhD)
- Board member of: Science and Technology Facilities Council; Midlands Innovation
- Awards: Suffrage Science award (2019)
- Scientific career
- Fields: Mechanical engineering Acoustic emission
- Workplaces: Cranfield University; Rolls-Royce Holdings; Cardiff University
- Thesis: The nondestructive testing of wire ropes by acoustic emission (1987)

Vice-chancellor of Cranfield University
- Incumbent
- Assumed office 2021
- Preceded by: Peter Gregson

Deputy Vice-chancellor of Cardiff University
- In office 2017–2021
- Vice-chancellor: Colin Riordan
- Preceded by: Elizabeth Treasure
- Succeeded by: Damian Walford Davies
- Website: www.cranfield.ac.uk/about/senior-team/professor-karen-holford

Dame Karen Margaret Holford (born 1962) is a Welsh-domiciled engineer, professor of mechanical engineering and vice-chancellor and chief executive of Cranfield University. She was formerly deputy vice-chancellor at Cardiff University. She is also a former pro vice-chancellor of the College of Physical Sciences and Engineering and head of the School of Engineering. She is an active researcher of acoustic emission and her work has been applied to damage assessment inspections on industrial components.

== Education ==
Holford was educated at Newent Comprehensive School and read mechanical engineering at the University of Wales Institute of Science and Technology with sponsorship from Rolls-Royce and was the first member of her family to attend a higher education institution. She graduated with a Bachelor of Engineering degree in 1984 followed by a PhD from University College, Cardiff in 1987.

This came after her school art teacher encouraged her to pursue the course, even though her careers advisor had discouraged her from studying engineering, which was perceived as a predominately male area. She later returned to Rolls-Royce.

== Career and research ==
During her time at Rolls-Royce Holford contributed to the construction of the Adour and Pegasus engines with help from engineers across Europe and the United States and development work in advanced engineering. After completing the course Holford was employed at local company AB Electronic Products as a senior engineer. She became involved in project management for technical products which included the development and design of a thin film pressure sensor for anti-lock braking systems in BMW road cars. Holford also developed electronic products for Jaguar Cars and Rover motor cars.

She started her academic career in 1990 as an advisor at Cardiff University for their Integrated Engineering course, which aimed to increase industrial participation in degree teaching and provide a cross-discipline education, and was employed by the University in the same year as a lecturer in engineering. Holford has published over 170 research works, including 100 peer-reviewed journal papers. She has led research projects totalling over £7.5 million funded from a wide variety of sources, including Engineering and Physical Sciences Research Council (EPSRC), Innovate UK, Knowledge Transfer Partnerships (KTP), European Union and industry. Her primary research is damage assessment inspections using acoustic emission (AE) applied across several industrial applications, including bridges, aerospace landing gear and composite materials, concrete and metals. Holford and her team later focussed on the improvement of AE damage location techniques, energy harvesting and embedded sensors aimed at the development of autonomous structural health monitoring systems. She also served as the faculty advisor for Cardiff University's Formula Student team, an UpRising ambassador, and a Director of the Compound Semiconductor Centre. Outside of academia Holford entered the first rounds of the 2004 Formula Woman Championship behind the wheel of a Caterham 7.

=== External service ===
Holford has served as a council member for UK Research and Innovation Science and Technology Facilities Council (STFC) and a member of the ESPRC Strategic Advisory Network, having previously served as the external chair of the EPSRC Engineering Strategic Advisory Team. In 2019 she joined the National Physical Laboratory Science and Technology Advisory Council, and in 2020, took up the role of chair of the Royal Academy of Engineering Research Committee. Holford is a leading advocate of engineering and is part of several committees and organisations that actively encourage young people to consider a career in the field. She is also chief executive and vice-chancellor at Cranfield University.

=== Awards and honours ===
Holford's work has earned her several awards. In 2002 she was awarded a Royal Academy prize for 'Engineering Excellence' in TCS work. In 2006, she was a recipient of Welsh Woman of the Year in Science and Technology. She was awarded the WISE Excellence Award for “personal contribution to engineering and a long term commitment to supporting girls and young women in science and engineering” in 2007, and in 2016 won the Chwarae Teg Womenspire 'Women in Education' Award.

Holford is a Chartered Engineer, a Fellow of the Institution of Mechanical Engineers (FIMechE), Fellow of the Learned Society of Wales (FLSW), Fellow of the Women's Engineering Society (FWES), and was elected a Fellow of the Royal Academy of Engineering (FREng) in 2015. In 2016 she was named in the inaugural Daily Telegraph's list of the Top 50 Women in Engineering. She won the Suffrage Science award in 2019. She was appointed Commander of the British Empire (CBE) in the 2018 New Year Honours and a Dame of the same order (DBE) in the 2024 Birthday Honours.
