= Newent Onion Fayre =

Defunct fair in England

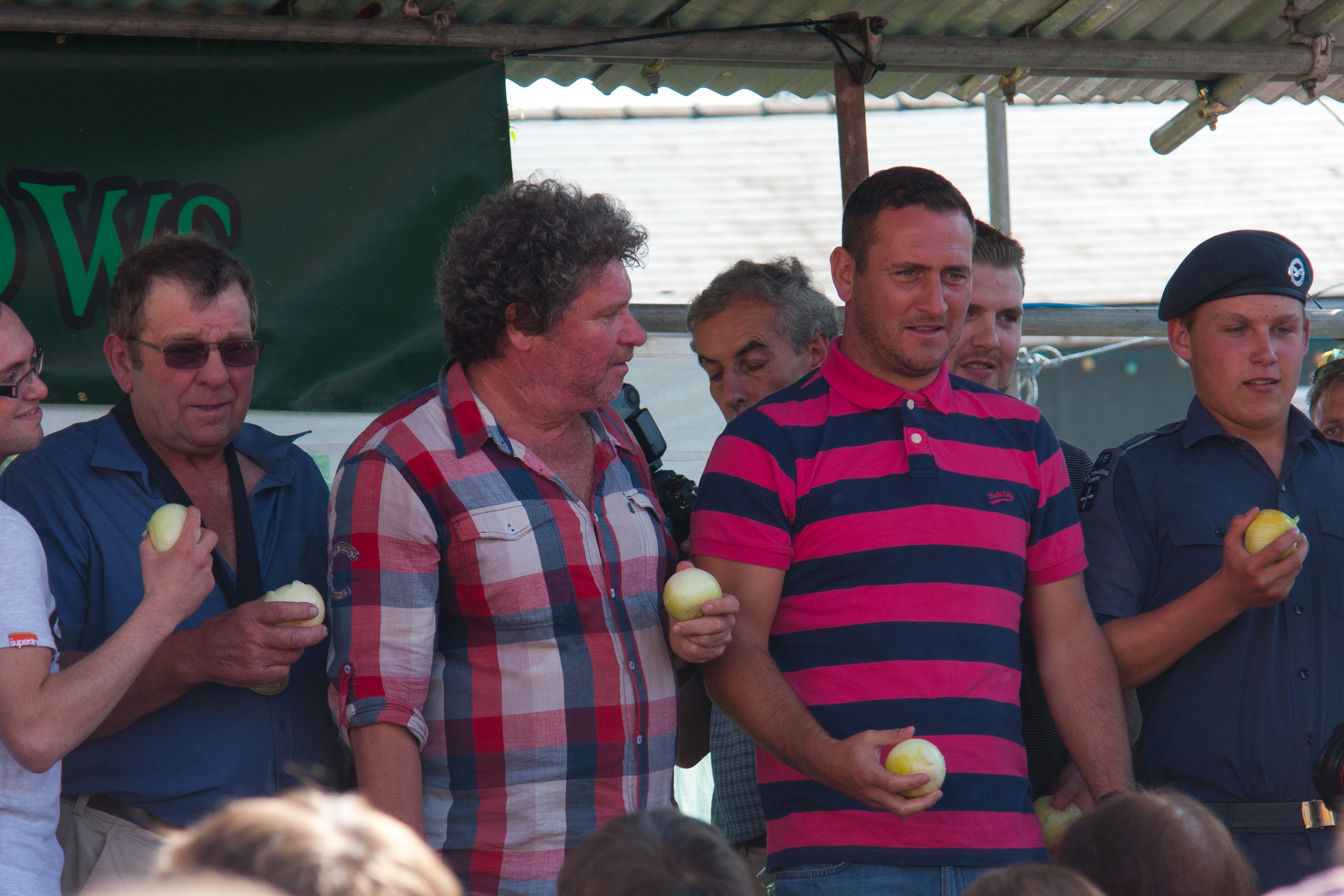
Rory McGrath and Will Mellor participating in the onion-eating contest in 2012

The Newent Onion Fayre was a fair held in Newent, Gloucestershire, England, from the mediaeval period until 1939. The fair was revived in 1996 but cancelled in 2022, as a result of declining support following the COVID-19 pandemic. The fair featured a vegetable show, up to 150 traders, a pleasure fair and a raw onion eating competition. The revived festival attracted up to 15,000 attendees.

== History ==
The fair dates back to a 13th-century charter granting Newent the right to hold a market and two annual fairs. The fairs were of a more general character but the one held in September later became known as the onion fair after becoming associated with traders bringing the vegetable from Evesham, Worcestershire. The onions were sold to Welsh cattle drovers taking the animals to market at Gloucester. Gloucestershire County Council say they hold documents indicating that the first of these fairs was held in either 1253 or 1313. Local folklore also states that onion sellers from northern France visited the fair.

In the early period stone grave markers in the graveyard of the church of St Mary were covered with table cloths to serve as market stalls. In the 19th century the price of onions sold at the Newent fair set a standard for sellers in Birmingham, Gloucester and South Wales. During the mid-19th century the fair also served as a venue for the sale of livestock, particularly sheep. A pleasure fair also operated at the event and around the turn of the 20th century the local press had noted that this had become the primary event of the onion fair. A report in the Worcestershire Chronicle on the 1899 fair lamented that only one consignment of onions was sold and that the Market Square was largely occupied by rides. The Gloucestershire Echo in 1900 remarked that the trade part of the onion fair was "becoming a thing of the past" and that that year five consignments of onions, totalling less than 0.5 long tons (0.51 t) were sold. The Hereford Journal noted that only a few hundredweight (a unit of weight of 112 pounds, 51 kg) were sold at the 1905 fair.

By the 1900s the ministers of religion in the town came together to hold a special service to cater for the travelling showmen of the pleasure fair. The fair suffered a decline in the years following the First World War (1914–1918) and almost died out in the 1930s. The last fair was held in 1939 because of the outbreak of the Second World War and was not resumed upon peace in 1945.

== 1996–2022 revival ==
The fair was brought back as the Newent Onion Fayre by locals in 1996. The fair which, in the early years was sometimes held in conjunction with a beer festival, was held on the second Saturday in September between 10 am and 5 pm.

The event featured onion-related market stalls, a children's under-and-over onion race, an onion-eating competition, a vegetable show and a pleasure fair. It is thought to have been the largest British onion-related event and attracted up to 150 stalls and 15,000 visitors, more than doubling the population of the town. The vegetable show was affiliated with the National Vegetable Society and featured all types of allium. It included a vegetable character competition that has featured tortoises and snails made from onions and a depiction of former cabinet minister Jacob Rees-Mogg made from leeks. The fair also featured musical performances and in 1999 was opened by the Wurzels.

The eating competition was won by the competitor who could eat a raw onion the quickest. Competitors in the male category had to eat a 7-ounce (200 g) onion and those in the female category a 5-ounce (140 g) onion. Competitors were permitted to wash down the onion with half a pint of bitter. At the 2000 event more than 6 long tons (6.1 t) of onions were sold or eaten.

The COVID-19 pandemic caused the fair to be suspended from 2020 and, in 2022, it was cancelled for good with organisers blaming a lack of support following the pandemic.
