= Ruardean Hill =

Hill in Gloucestershire, England

Coordinates: 51.84949°N 2.53129°W

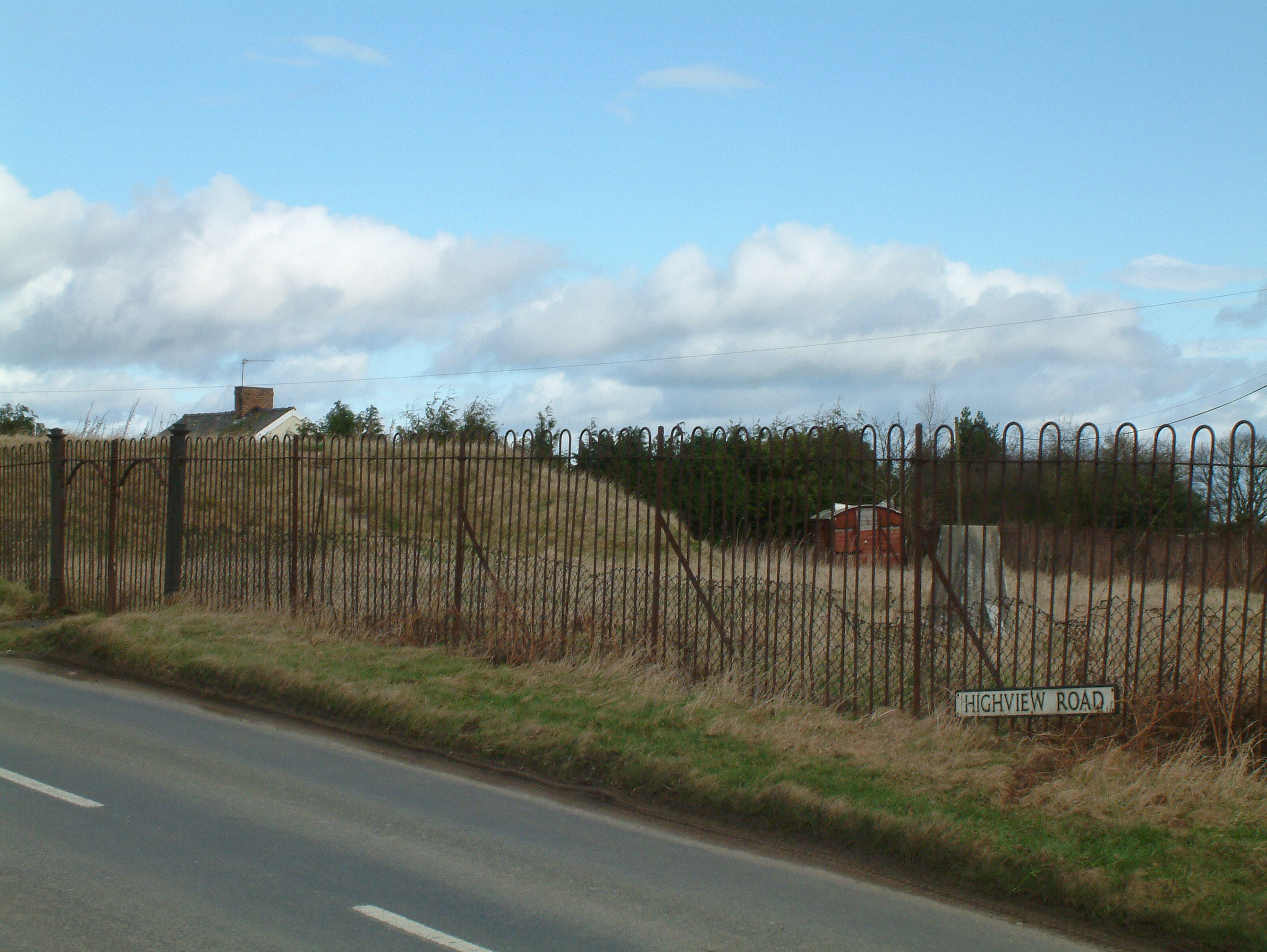
- Trig point and covered reservoir on Highview Road on Ruardean Hill

Highest point
- Elevation: 290 m (950 ft)
- Prominence: c. 174 m
- Parent peak: May Hill
- Listing: Marilyn

Geography
- Location: Gloucestershire, England
- OS grid: SO635169
- Topo map: OS Landranger 162

Ruardean Hill is a prominent hill and a village in the English county of Gloucestershire, 20 km (12 mi) west of Gloucester. It lies in the Forest of Dean, in the parish of Drybrook.

The southern slopes are wooded and are part of the northern edge of the Forest of Dean. The hill forms part of a low range of hills separating the River Severn from the River Wye. The hill's summit is the highest point in the Forest of Dean. A mostly friendly community, there was a local post office and village shop in neighbouring Ruardean Woodside. The village and surrounding areas are well served by Ruardean Hill Sports and Social Club.

== Nearest places ==
- Brierley
- Drybrook
- Ruardean Woodside
- Ruardean
- Steam Mills
