= Ruardyn Castle =

Castle

Coordinates: 51.8576°N 2.5515°W

- Ruardean

Ruardyn Castle was a manor house in the village of Ruardean. Its ruins have been scheduled as an ancient monument.

It was originally a manor house built in Norman times, but because of its strategic importance it was crenellated in 1311 and became a castle. The surviving evidence suggests the site comprised a courtyard, flanked by short ranges of buildings to the north east and south west, with a tower in the western corner. A gatehouse stood to the south east, with a hollow way leading from it towards the parish church. The site was probably enclosed by a curtain wall. The castle suffered major damage during the English Civil War in the 17th century.

Nowadays, little remains of the castle, just large mounds with some stone wall surviving on the steep bank side. By the size of the landscape that it once stood, it is suggested that it was of considerable size. Its ruins can be found in the field behind St. John the Baptist church.
