= The Pludds =

Hamlet in Gloucestershire, England

Coordinates: 51.84218°N 2.55734°W

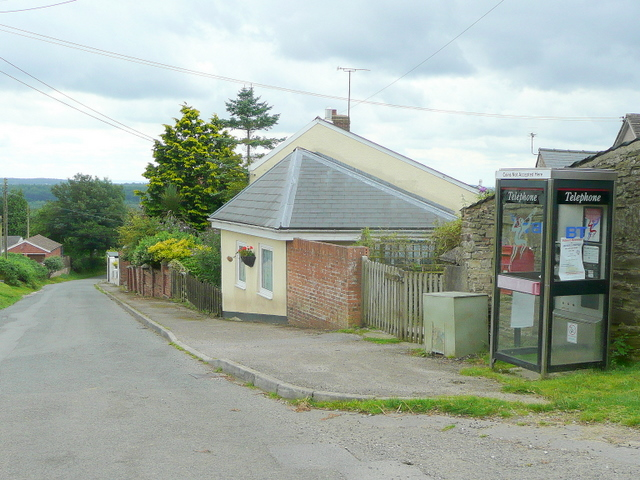

- Location within Gloucestershire
- OS grid reference: SO617161
- Civil parish: Ruardean
- District: Forest of Dean
- Shire county: Gloucestershire
- Region: South West
- Country: England
- Sovereign state: United Kingdom
- Police: Gloucestershire
- Fire: Gloucestershire
- Ambulance: South Western
- UK Parliament: Forest of Dean

The Pludds is a hamlet in the Forest of Dean, Gloucestershire, England (grid reference SO617161). Lydbrook and Joys Green are to the west, Ruardean is to the north, and Ruardean Woodside is to the east. The Pludds has a village hall.

== History ==
The name of the hamlet derives from the Middle English word "pludde" or "plodde", meaning a pool or puddle. The area was known as The Pludds by 1787 when a few houses are reported. One of the oldest surviving houses, Pludds Court, dates from the late 18th or early 19th century. Occasional building continued at the Pludds after 1840 and a beerhouse called the Royal Oak had opened by 1891. In the late 19th and early 20th century there was a coal shaft known as "Pluds" just southwest of the hamlet, which formed part of the Lydbrook Colliery.

The hamlet had shops, a beerhouse, a choral society, and a cricket club, but these had all been closed or been disbanded by 1990. The village hall, built in 1975, continues in use.
