= Alex Cuthbert =

Wales & British Lions international rugby union player

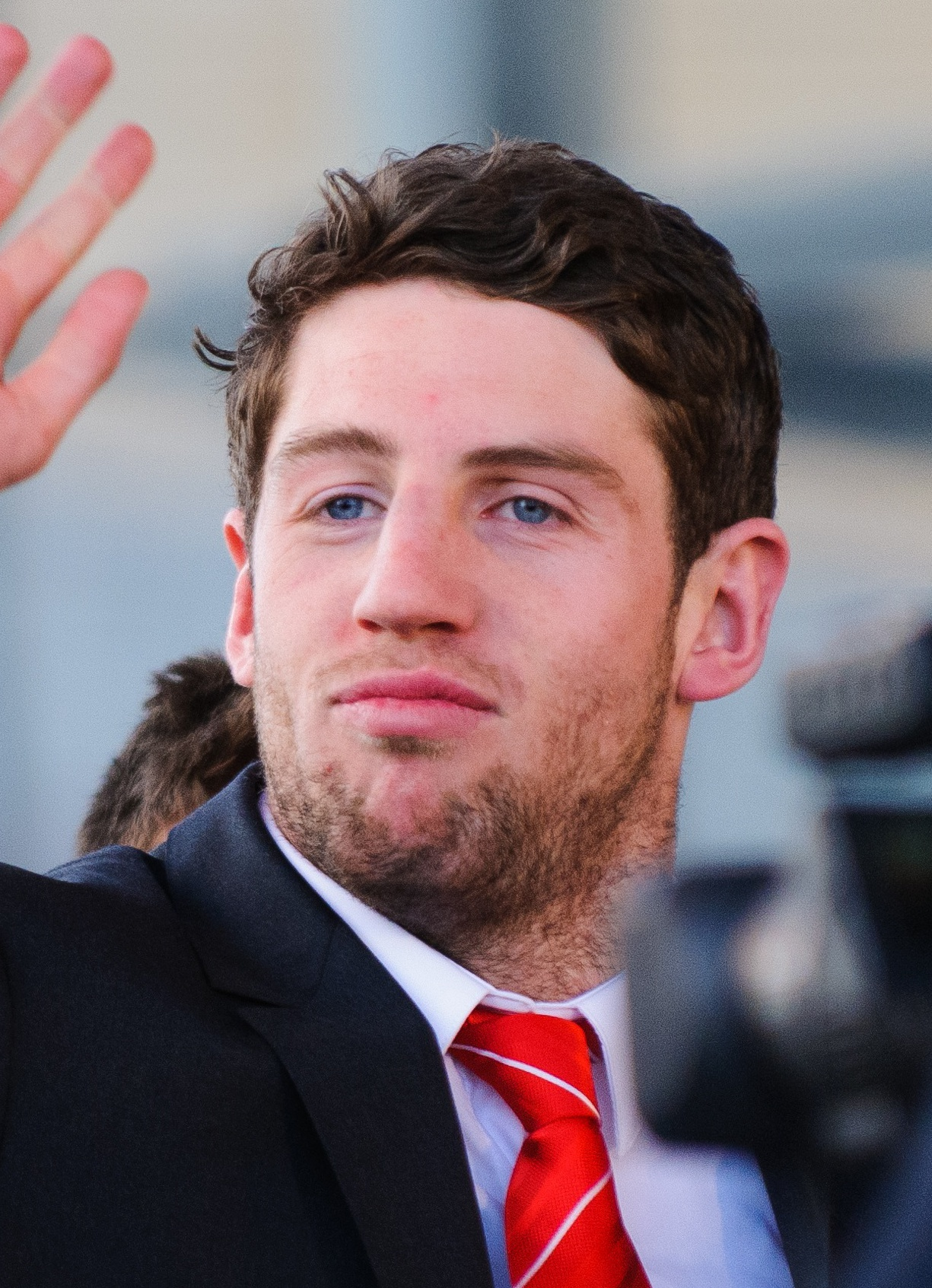
- Cuthbert on 19 March 2012
- Full name: Alexander Charles Gordon Cuthbert
- Born: 5 April 1990 (age 36) Gloucester, England
- Height: 1.99 m (6 ft 6 in)
- Weight: 106 kg (16 st 10 lb)
- School: Newent Community School; Hartpury College
- University: UWIC

Rugby union career
- Position: Wing
Youth career
- Hartpury College
Senior career
Years	Team	Apps	(Points)
2011	Cardiff	5	(15)
2008–2011	UWIC	?	(?)
2011–2018	Cardiff Blues	120	(250)
2018–2021	Exeter Chiefs	29	(35)
2021–2024	Ospreys	18	(20)
International career
Years	Team	Apps	(Points)
2009–2011	Wales Sevens	?	(?)
2011–2023	Wales	57	(85)
2013	British & Irish Lions	1	(5)

Alex Cuthbert (born 5 April 1990) is an English-born Welsh former rugby union player. Born and raised in Gloucester, he played on the wing for the Ospreys and the Wales national team.

== Early life ==
Born in Gloucester, Cuthbert went to Newent Community School. He gained a diploma at Hartpury College before studying at Cardiff Metropolitan University.

== Playing career ==
Cuthbert first played rugby during his years studying at Newent Community School playing club rugby for Hucclecote RFC and Westbury-on-Severn RFC. He later moved to Hartpury College where he was a member of Hartpury College R.F.C., coached by Allan Lewis in a team that included Jonny May on the opposite wing. He then moved to study at UWIC, where he played for both the college and Cardiff RFC.

Cuthbert came to wider attention in 2011 with the Cardiff Blues. As an attacking threat he underlined his credentials during the region's Heineken Cup campaign - scoring a brace as they secured a quarter-final berth with victory over Racing Metro.

Cuthbert retired in 2025.

=== International career ===
==== Wales ====
Although born and raised in England, Cuthbert qualifies for Wales as his mother was born in Wrexham.

He was noticed by Wales rugby sevens team coach Paul John. As a result, Cuthbert played for them in the 2009-2010 and the 2010-2011 IRB Sevens World Series, and in the 2010 Commonwealth Games.

Wales' senior management were also quick to take notice of Cuthbert's emergence, and he made his debut in the 12/11 international against Australia. There he replaced George North in the second-half, but it was the slot vacated by the retired Shane Williams that became his for the opening game of the 2012 Six Nations. At around 6'5, unusually tall for a winger, he represented a change of style from Williams' dancing feet and low centre of gravity, but his domestic form, pace and finishing prowess stacked up for Warren Gatland.

Cuthbert featured in the starting line-up in all five games of Wales' 2012 Six Nations Championship. He scored the opening try for Wales during their 27–13 victory over Scotland, then scored the second try of Wales' convincing 24–3 win over Italy in the penultimate round of the tournament. He was awarded man of the match for this performance. Cuthbert scored the only try in the final game of Wales' Six Nations campaign of 2012, against France, helping them to win the Grand Slam for the third time in eight seasons.

In the Autumn internationals of 2012 against Argentina, Samoa, New Zealand and Australia, Cuthbert was selected to play in each game. During the game against New Zealand, he scored the second Welsh try.

He scored two tries for Wales against England in the title decider of the 2013 Six Nations Championship.

==== British & Irish Lions ====
Cuthbert was selected for the 2013 British & Irish Lions tour to Australia, playing and scoring a try in the First Test, which the Lions won.

=== International tries ===
==== Wales ====
Try	Opponent	Location	Venue	Competition	Date	Result
1	Scotland	Cardiff, Wales	Millennium Stadium	2012 Six Nations	12 February 2012	Win
2	Italy	Cardiff, Wales	Millennium Stadium	2012 Six Nations	10 March 2012	Win
3	France	Cardiff, Wales	Millennium Stadium	2012 Six Nations	17 March 2012	Win
4	Australia	Brisbane, Australia	Lang Park	2012 Australian Tour	16 June 2012	Loss
5	New Zealand	Cardiff, Wales	Millennium Stadium	2012 Autumn Internationals	24 November 2012	Loss
6	Ireland	Cardiff, Wales	Millennium Stadium	2013 Six Nations	2 February 2013	Loss
7	Italy	Rome, Italy	Stadio Olimpico	2013 Six Nations	23 February 2013	Win
8	England	Cardiff, Wales	Millennium Stadium	2013 Six Nations	16 March 2013	Win
9	England	Cardiff, Wales	Millennium Stadium	2013 Six Nations	16 March 2013	Win
10	Italy	Cardiff, Wales	Millennium Stadium	2014 Six Nations	1 February 2014	Win
11	South Africa	Durban, South Africa	Kings Park Stadium	2014 South African Tour	14 June 2014	Loss
12	South Africa	Nelspruit, South Africa	Mbombela Stadium	2014 South African Tour	21 June 2014	Loss
13	Australia	Cardiff, Wales	Millennium Stadium	2014 Autumn Internationals	8 November 2014	Loss
14	Fiji	Cardiff, Wales	Millennium Stadium	2014 Autumn Internationals	15 November 2014	Win
15	Ireland	Cardiff, Wales	Millennium Stadium	2015 Rugby World Cup warm-up matches	8 August 2015	Loss
16	Tonga	Auckland, New Zealand	Eden Park	2017 Summer Internationals	16 June 2017	Win
17	Fiji	Cardiff, Wales	Millennium Stadium	2021 Autumn Internationals	14 November 2021	Win

==== British & Irish Lions ====
Try	Opponent	Location	Venue	Competition	Date	Result
1	Australia	Brisbane, Australia	Lang Park	2013 British & Irish Lions tour to Australia	22 June 2013	Win

== Personal life ==
Cuthbert has discussed the impact of adverse social media at times in his career.
