= Mitcheldean =

Market town in Gloucestershire, England

Coordinates: 51.8646°N 2.4904°W

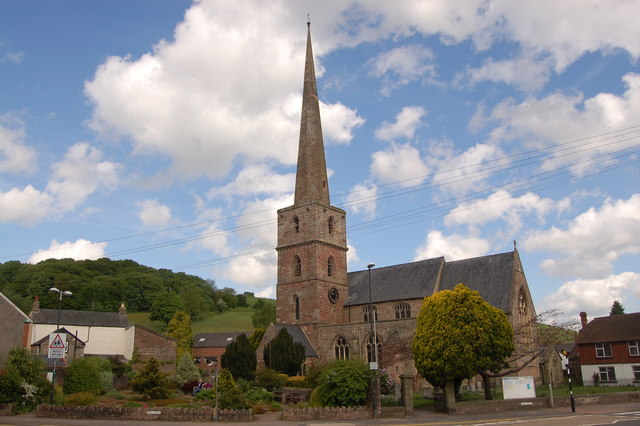
- Church of St Michael and All Angels, Mitcheldean

- Location within Gloucestershire
- Population: 2,776 (2021 Census)
- OS grid reference: SO663185
- District: Forest of Dean
- Shire county: Gloucestershire
- Region: South West
- Country: England
- Sovereign state: United Kingdom
- Post town: Mitcheldean
- Postcode district: GL17
- Police: Gloucestershire
- Fire: Gloucestershire
- Ambulance: South Western
- UK Parliament: Forest of Dean

Mitcheldean is a market town in the Forest of Dean in Gloucestershire, England.

== History ==
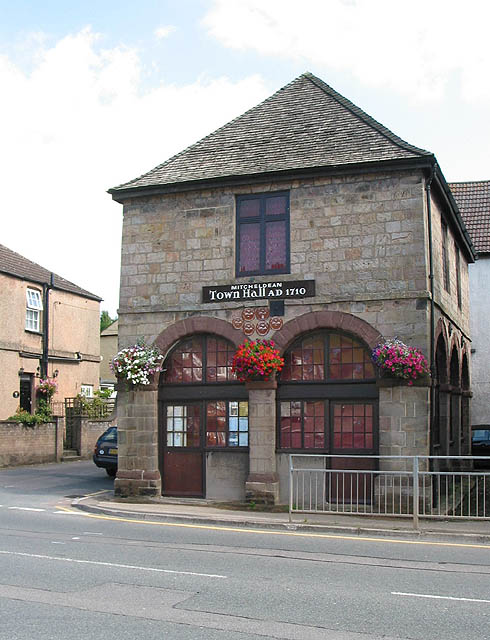
Mitcheldean Town Hall

The name Mitcheldean derives from the Old English miceldenu meaning 'big valley'.

Mitcheldean was a thriving community for many centuries due to the town's proximity to iron ore deposits. During the 19th century, the town grew due to revenues produced by Wintles' Forest Brewery.

Like several of the Forest of Dean villages, Mitcheldean is a close-knit community with individual traditions. One of these was the locally famous (or infamous) Mitcheldean Prize Brass Band. It is vividly remembered and described in a memoir by Arthur Bullock, a resident of nearby Longhope, whose father and brothers were in it. Recounting the band's exploits, he comments, 'I only wish I could have been privileged to hear the Mitcheldean Prize Brass Band play when all of the players were fully sober at the same time'. However then sobering to read his further reflection that the band must have been 'killed off by the 1914-18 war'.

In the 20th century the town grew further due to the Rank Xerox photocopier factory. Although this industry significantly declined during the latter half of the 20th century, much of the former Rank Xerox site (now Vantage Point Business Village) is now occupied by small businesses, new manufacturing and distribution businesses.

== Transport ==
Mitcheldean is served by buses 24, 33, 35a, 72 and 746, which give it regular connections to Hereford, Gloucester, Cinderford, Coleford, Ross-on-Wye, Lydney and Chepstow. Mitcheldean was served by Mitcheldean Road railway station on the former Hereford, Ross and Gloucester Railway until its closure in 1964. The station was quite a distance from the town – almost two miles away in Lea, Herefordshire. The nearest station was actually Longhope railway station in the neighboring village of Longhope. Today, the nearest railway station is Gloucester railway station (12 miles), with Lydney and Ledbury at 14 and 16 miles away respectively.

== Governance ==
The town is the most populous area of 'Mitcheldean and Drybrook' electoral ward. This ward starts in the north east at Mitcheldean and stretches south westerly to Drybrook. The total ward population taken at the 2011 census was 4,607.

== Amenities ==
There are several shops in the centre of the town, a Co-operative store, a butcher. three hairdressers, a pharmacy, a florist and three fast food outlets. There is also a community library, a doctor's surgery, and two pubs. There is also a Brewery bar/pub and separate restaurant in the Mews. Mitcheldean Town Hall was completed in 1710.

== Church of St Michael ==
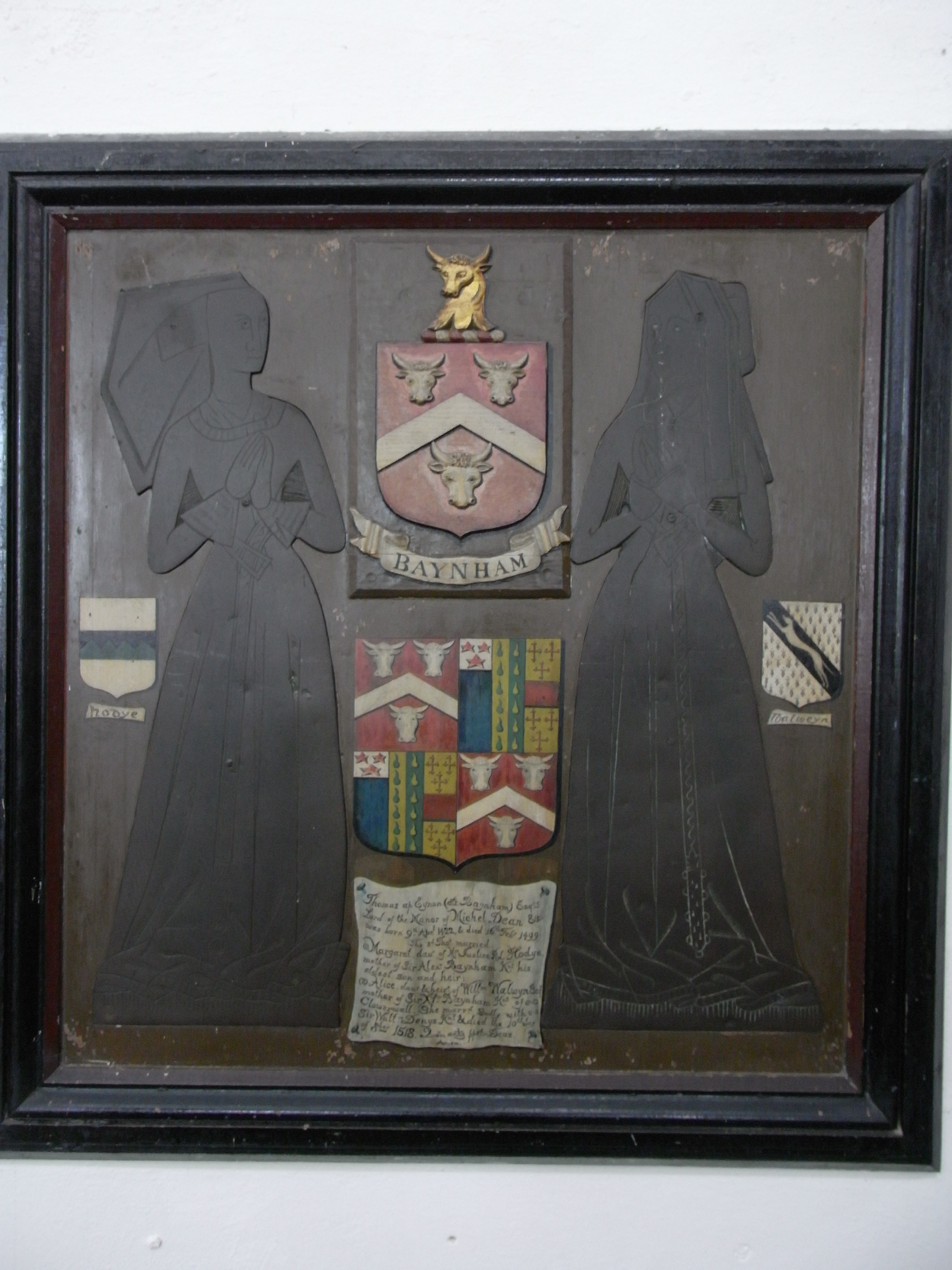
Monumental brass of wives of Sir Thomas Baynham (d.1499–1500), Church of St Michael, Mitcheldean

Mitcheldean's wealthy tradition is evident in some of its buildings in the town centre, particularly the church of St. Michael.

== Schools ==
The town has a secondary school, Dene Magna School, which has performed consistently well in Ofsted inspections since 2001. The school has a sixth form and provides A-levels at a second campus in Cinderford which is a shared space with GlosCol. The other options for Year 12 students are Gloucestershire College, Newent Community School, Forest High School in Cinderford and a Sixth Form Centre in Newent, John Kyrle High School in Ross-on-Wye, Monmouth Comprehensive School in Monmouth or one of the grammar school-based sixth forms in Gloucester. As well as a secondary school, Mitcheldean has a primary school of about 200 children.

== Media ==
Local news and television programmes are BBC West Midlands and ITV Central. Television signals are received from the Ridge Hill TV transmitter. Local radio stations are BBC Radio Gloucestershire on 104.7 FM, Heart West on 102.4 FM, Greatest Hits Radio South West on 107.5 FM, and Dean Radio, a community based radio station that broadcast on 95.7 FM. The town is served by the local newspaper, The Forester.

== Sport ==
Mitcheldean has two men's football teams. The team competes in the North Gloucestershire Association Football League. The club also has a ladies team and a youth section, consisting of teams between the ages of 9-15, each of which compete in the Severn Valley youth football league.
