= Drybrook =

Village in Gloucestershire, England

Coordinates: 51.856°N 2.515°W

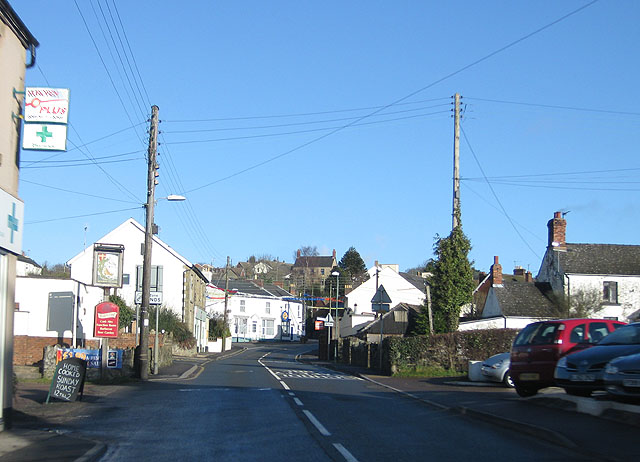

- Location within Gloucestershire
- Population: 3,052 (2011 Census)
- OS grid reference: SO646176
- District: Forest of Dean
- Shire county: Gloucestershire
- Region: South West
- Country: England
- Sovereign state: United Kingdom
- Post town: DRYBROOK
- Postcode district: GL17
- Dialling code: 01594
- Police: Gloucestershire
- Fire: Gloucestershire
- Ambulance: South Western
- UK Parliament: Forest of Dean

Drybrook is a village and civil parish in the Forest of Dean in west Gloucestershire, England.

== Location ==
It lies in the north-west edge of the Royal Forest, bordering with Herefordshire, about three miles (5 km) from Cinderford, and about two miles (3 km) from Mitcheldean.

== Population ==
In the 2001 census, Drybrook had a population of 2,855. This includes 1,391 men and 1,464 women. There are 1,146 households in the village. By the 2011 census the population had increased to 3,052.

== Amenities ==
The village has a range of amenities, including a chemist, general stores, hairdresser, fish and chips shop, builder's merchant, doctor's surgery, nursery school, primary school, and a bus service to Gloucester and surrounding areas.

The nearest secondary school is Dene Magna School, which is in Mitcheldean. Drybrook has a rugby club, which is at the top of the High Street, and it also has a football club on Harrow Hill. Among the villages in the Forest of Dean, Drybrook has been voted one of the best villages to live in, for its scenery and leisure.

== Education ==
Drybrook School, which is the village's only school, is a primary school for pupils of ages 4 years to 11 years. The nearest secondary school is Dene Magna Community School, which is in Abenhall, by Mitcheldean. Dene Magna Community School is about 1 mile from Drybrook.

== Royal Forest ==
Drybrook is also known as a royal hunting ground, where the white deer, and, according to legend a black panther roamed. Unfortunately, the white deer was killed after being hit down and then trophy hunters cut off its head, but the police have not caught the person responsible. Drybrook also had a good supply of coal and stone. As Drybrook grew, so did its boundary, and it grew to include a small village called Harrow Hill (or as most locals call it, Harry Hill). The village's first modern church, The Holy Trinity Church, was built on Harrow Hill in 1817. The church's location is on the way to Mitcheldean.

== Mechanical Organ Museum ==
The Mechanical Organ Museum is situated at the north end of the village, on the road to Lea and Ross-on-Wye. It has been called "a unique collection of mechanical music spanning the last 150 years, hidden away on the edge of the Forest of Dean. Mechanical organs, polyphons, pianola, automatic piano, electronic organs & musical boxes".

== Climate ==
The Forest of Dean has been known for warm summers and cold winters. Some of the extremes that have been recorded in Drybrook are 36.6 °C in August 2003 European heat wave and -16 °C in January 2010. Snow and rain have also been a problem in the village: for example, in the winter of 2005, six inches of snow fell in a few hours, causing horrific traffic problems. And the Gloucestershire Floods of 2007 were also a major problem for the village. The averages are pretty much normal for Drybrook as they would be for most of the south of England, but in the winter it may change as Drybrook is on higher ground than other towns and cities in the surrounding area. For example, in January, the average high temperature in Drybrook is 3 °C while in Gloucester the average low temperature is 7 °C.

Drybrook experiences an oceanic climate (Köppen climate classification Cfb). The information below is Gloucester's climate.

Climate data for Drybrook, (Gloucester)
Month	Jan	Feb	Mar	Apr	May	Jun	Jul	Aug	Sep	Oct	Nov	Dec	Year
Mean daily maximum °C (°F)	8 (46)	9 (48)	11 (52)	14 (57)	18 (64)	20 (68)	23 (73)	23 (73)	19 (66)	15 (59)	11 (52)	7 (45)	14.8 (58.6)
Mean daily minimum °C (°F)	3 (37)	4 (39)	4 (39)	6 (43)	8 (46)	12 (54)	13 (55)	13 (55)	11 (52)	8 (46)	6 (43)	4 (39)	7.7 (45.9)
Average precipitation mm (inches)	63.2 (2.49)	51.2 (2.02)	46.5 (1.83)	77.7 (3.06)	45.9 (1.81)	52.3 (2.06)	43.3 (1.70)	53.9 (2.12)	63.4 (2.50)	93.3 (3.67)	69.5 (2.74)	77.8 (3.06)	738 (29.1)

== Severn and Wye Railway ==
Drybrook Road railway station railway station closed in 1943.
