= May Hill, Gloucestershire =

Hill in Gloucestershire, England

May Hill
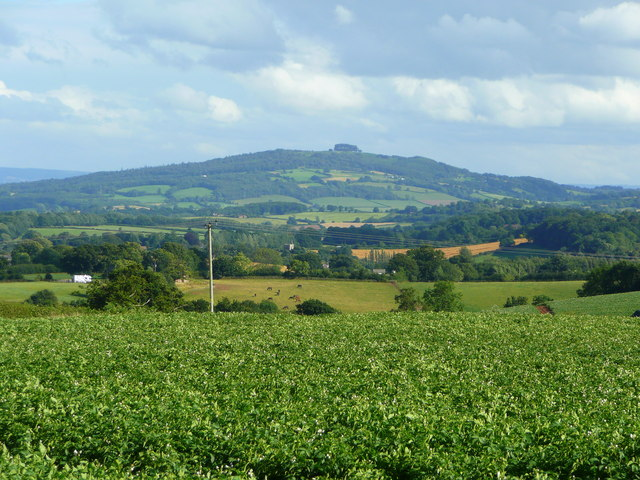
- May Hill from Perrystone Hill

Highest point
- Elevation: 296 m (971 ft)
- Prominence: c. 217 m
- Parent peak: Worcestershire Beacon
- Listing: Marilyn

Geography
- Location: Gloucestershire, England
- OS grid: SO695213
- Topo map: OS Landranger 162

May Hill is a prominent English hill between Gloucester and Ross-on-Wye. Its summit, on the western edge of Gloucestershire and its northern slopes in Herefordshire, is distinguishable by a clump of trees on its summit, which forms an official Site of Special Scientific Interest. It is reached by three public footpaths, two as parts of the Gloucestershire Way and Wysis Way.

== Toponymy ==
There is an unverified story that May Hill was named after a certain Captain May who used it as a landmark when navigating the Severn estuary, but documents from a couple of hundred years ago relate that the hill was known as Yartleton Hill and was renamed because of the May Day events held there. Each May Day, morris dancers dance in the new dawn on the top of May Hill and hundreds of observers join in the celebration. A ceremony on May Day morning has been carried out for several centuries; originally it included a mock battle between youths.

== Geography ==
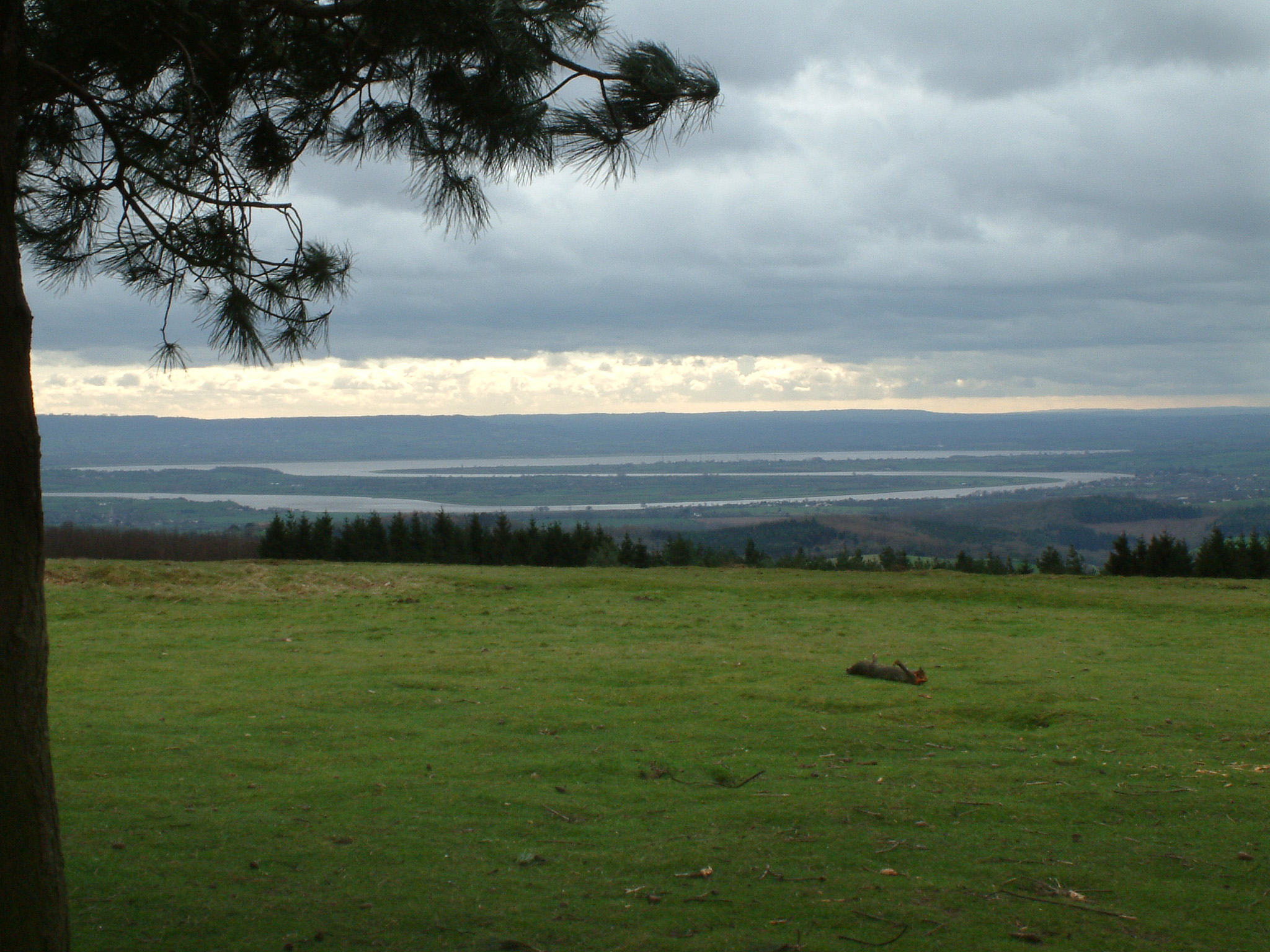
The Severn from May Hill

May Hill forms part of a low range of hills separating the River Severn from the River Wye. The summit is 296 metres (971 ft) above sea level. Among the trees there are several benches from which the views in all directions can be seen. They include views to the Welsh borders, and the lower reaches of the River Severn, bypassed for shipping by the Gloucester and Sharpness Canal.

== Geology ==
May Hill is formed of sandstones and siltstones previously known as the May Hill Sandstone, now split out into the Huntley Hill and Yartleton formations. These rocks date from the Early Silurian period and are formed into a dome, cut through by several faults. The most significant of these is the Blaisdon Fault, which forms the eastern boundary of May Hill and separates it from the younger rocks of the Severn Vale.

== Ecology and SSSI status ==
May Hill
- Site of Special Scientific Interest
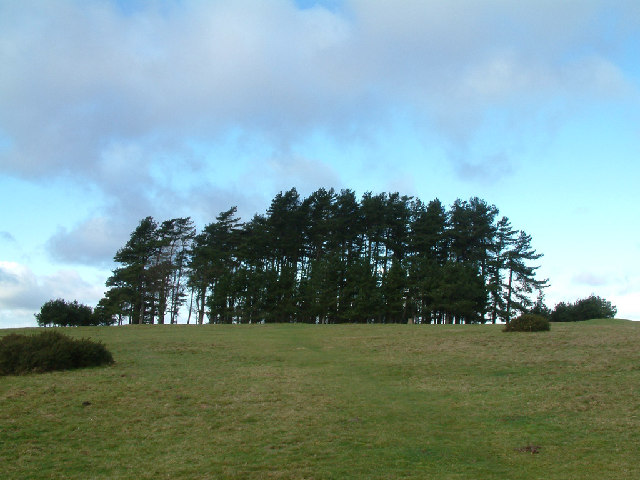
- Trees on the summit of May Hill
- Location of May Hill.
- Area of search: Gloucestershire
- Grid reference: SO695214
- Coordinates: 51.890765°N 2.443869°W
- Interest: Biological/Geological
- Area: 32.6 ha (81 acres)
- Notification date: 1954

The summit of May Hill (grid reference SO695214) is a 32.6-hectare (81-acre) biological and geological Site of Special Scientific Interest in Gloucestershire, notified in 1954.

May Hill is listed in the Forest of Dean Local Plan Review as a Key Wildlife Site (KWS).

Much of May Hill is wooded, both coniferous and deciduous, but the summit area is grassland and heath, with a small amount of heather and gorse. The immediate summit is topped with mature Corsican pines, planted in 1887 to mark Queen Victoria's Golden Jubilee. One very old Scots Pine is a generation older, but which regrettably suffered badly in an ice storm in early 2012. The trees make May Hill an identifiable landmark from many miles away. The younger trees were planted to mark Queen Elizabeth's Silver Jubilee. Early maps and accounts show a clump of trees on the top before these plantings. Birds to be seen on the hill include meadow pipit, tree pipit, common redstart and raven, whilst the woods below have a good population of woodcock.

== History ==
The hill includes a circular trench 100 metres in diameter, thought to be an Iron Age earthwork, surrounding a mound that is probably a round barrow.

There are records of a clump of trees on the summit of May Hill dating back to the later 18th century. The hill was enclosed by an Act of Parliament in 1873. The dwindling clump was replenished in time for the Golden Jubilee of Queen Victoria in 1887, when most of the trees that give the hill its distinctive character today were planted.

An area of 30 ha of the hill passed into the care of the National Trust in 1935, although the summit has remained vested with Longhope Parish Council and registered as a village green.

There was further replenishment of the trees in 1977 for the Silver Jubilee of Elizabeth II. A plaque on the summit commemorating this reads:

This plaque was erected by the parishes of Longhope & Newent as a tribute to a gracious and beloved monarch. God Save the Queen.

The site boundary was amended in 1983.

May Hill used to have a football club, whose biggest honour was winning the George Sandoe Cup in the 1950s. The village no longer has a football team, the closest being Longhope Football Club in the neighbouring village.

== May Hill in cultural life ==
May Hill is associated with the poets Edward Thomas and Robert Frost. John Masefield describes May Hill in his poem "The Everlasting Mercy". Ivor Gurney eulogised "May Hill that Gloucester dwellers 'gainst every sunset see." Composer Gerald Finzi's ashes were scattered on the top in 1973. One of the benches on the summit is dedicated to the Forest of Dean chronicler, Winifred Foley, and her husband, who had moved to the nearby village of Cliffords Mesne in the 1970s. A book of paintings and drawings of May Hill has been published by the artist Valerie McLean.
