= John Kyrle High School =

The John Kyrle High School & Sixth Form Centre

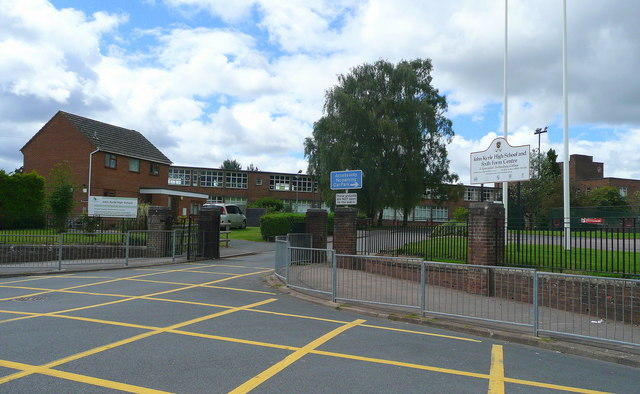

Location
- Ledbury Road; Ross-on-Wye, Herefordshire, HR9 7ET; England; 51.924°N 2.578°W

Information
- Type: Academy
- Motto: Carpe diem (Seize the Day)
- Established: 1953; 73 years ago
- Department for Education URN: 136399 Tables
- Ofsted: Reports
- Head teacher: Dr Luke Moseley
- Gender: Mixed
- Age: 11 to 18
- Enrolment: 1,288
- Colours: Red and black
- Website: www.jkhs.org.uk

John Kyrle High School is a secondary school and sixth form in Ross-on-Wye, Herefordshire, England. It is part of the Heart of Mercia Multi-Academy Trust. The school is named after the philanthropist John Kyrle (1637–1724), known as "The Man of Ross".

The school is a non-selective 11-18 high school with 1,288 students on roll as of September 2025.

== History ==
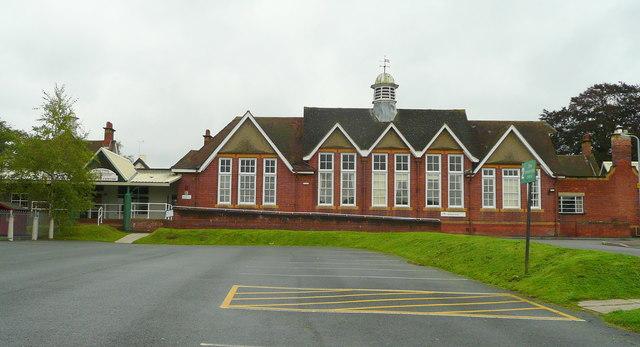
The former Grammar School buildings

The school site was opened in 1953 and was Herefordshire's first secondary modern school. The Ross-on-Wye Grammar School and secondary modern school, Over Ross School, were merged in 1979 to form a single comprehensive school called John Kyrle High School. In August 1979, the Lower School site, the former grammar school, was damaged by fire. This site was closed in 1997.

The school became an academy in 2012.

The site of the current school covers about 15 acres. The building was built during the Second World War and, although planned as a school, it also acted as an emergency hospital in case of severe bombings and the main corridors and rooms off it were built in such a way that it could be used as a hospital. The Ross-on-Wye Secondary Modern opened on the site in 1953 as a boys' school for 500 pupils. At this time there were 14 classrooms, a science room, an art room, two craft rooms, two domestic science rooms, library, two handicraft rooms, gymnasium with changing rooms, entrance and exhibition hall, an assembly hall, administration block, dining room and kitchens.

The cost of the building and grounds to Herefordshire County Council was £122,250 not including equipment.

== Inspection judgements ==
The school's most recent full Ofsted inspection was in September 2024, when the school was judged to be good in all areas.

== Links with Kisiki College ==
John Kyrle High School has had a partnership with Kisiki College in Namutumba, Uganda, for thirty years. The link has enabled numerous activities to take place such as student and staff exchanges from both schools, joint educational projects, and community involvement initiatives.

A key element of the link is in supporting infrastructure development at Kisiki College through fundraising efforts of John Kyrle students. The funds raised have been used for building and renovating classrooms, providing school materials, and improving sanitation facilities.

Students and teachers have participated in exchange visits, shared teaching methodologies, and engaged in collaborative classroom activities.

== Development ==
Over the years there has been much work done to the school, including lifts for disabled access to upper floors, refurbishment of the canteen, a Sixth Form Common Room, an astroturf pitch, a new music block, a gym, an entire maths block and more recently a £2.3 million approved science block, completed in April 2022.

The school holds a career convention.

== Wrongful dismissal case ==
Under previous leadership, In November 2020, an employment tribunal ruled that the academy acted illegally in dismissing a head of department for her union activities.

== High Court Case ==
In 2020 local newspapers reported that the school had spent £187,000 in legal fees opposing the opening of a Sixth Form by Dene Magna School in the neighbouring county of Gloucestershire. John Kyrle High School made an application to the High Court for a judicial review of the decision which the Regional School Commissioner had made about the new sixth form. John Kyrle High School lost the case and was ordered to pay £55,000 to Dene Magna School. John Kyrle High School was criticised by the National Education Union for taking legal action at a time when it had had to make some staff redundant. Following the court case, the school commissioned an external review of governance.
