= Dene Magna School =

Location
- Abenhall Road; Mitcheldean, Gloucestershire, GL17 0DU; England; 51°51′33″N 2°29′03″W

Information
- Type: Academy
- Motto: "That each and every learner shall achieve their maximum potential and enjoy the process."
- Established: 1930 (re-named 1985)
- Department for Education URN: 137387 Tables
- Ofsted: Reports
- Chair: Matthew Reid
- Headteacher: Declan Mooney
- Deputy Headteacher: Fred Mitchell
- Staff: 120
- Gender: Coeducational
- Age: 11 to 18
- Enrolment: 1005
- Capacity: 1125
- Houses: Dowty; Foley; Jenner; Wilson
- Colours: Blue, Yellow and White
- Website: http://www.denemagna.co.uk

Dene Magna School is a secondary school in Mitcheldean, Gloucestershire, England. The school takes both girls and boys, and has 1005 pupils aged between 11 and 18, including a sixth form. In 2005, the school was included on Ofsted's "Honours List" of 234 high-achieving schools, and received further positive Ofsted reports in 2008 and 2012. The headteacher is Declan Mooney, who replaced Stephen Brady in September 2024.

== School history ==
The school was established in 1930 as Abenhall County Secondary School. It became a secondary modern school following the Education Act 1944, and was then known as Abenhall Secondary Modern School. It later became Abenhall Comprehensive School, and was renamed Dene Magna Comprehensive School in 1985.

The school became a Technology College in 1999.

In 2011 the school adopted academy status, allowing governors and school management to take control of financial oversight of the school.

The school's sixth form was established in 2019 and is based at Gloucestershire College. Another school, John Kyrle High School in Herefordshire, had requested judicial review of the decision which the Regional School Commissioner had made about the new sixth form, but lost the case and was ordered to pay £55,000 to Dene Magna School.

== School performance ==
The school has a history of working to improve teaching. In 1993 it set up the Gloucestershire Initial Teacher Education Partnership with Cheltenham and Gloucester College of Higher Education. In 2002 the school was reported as "held in extremely high regard" and as a "leading edge school". In 2005 the school was noted to have observation rooms where teachers could be observed. In 2006 it had a "reflective practitioner programme" which contributed to a "powerful learning environment".

In 2008 and again in 2012 the school was judged Outstanding by Ofsted; as of 2022 the 2012 inspection is the most recent. This is despite a catchment area described as "not ... an advantaged area".

== Health and environmental campaigns ==
In 2000, the school was awarded a certificate by the United Nations for its contribution to environmental education, when a seven-month campaign to reduce the school's waste resulted in a 59% reduction in the volume of rubbish produced. The staff intended to change the menus for the food offered by the school to make the students' diets healthier, responding to the area's status as being the area with the highest incidence of heart disease in the country. The school was quoted as a case study in the White paper on public health.

== School links ==
The school has links with other schools in Kenya, Spain, Qatar and Japan. It achieved the International School Award in 1999.

== Notable former pupils ==
- Natasha Hunt, rugby union player
