= Katherine of Ledbury =

14th-century English anchorite

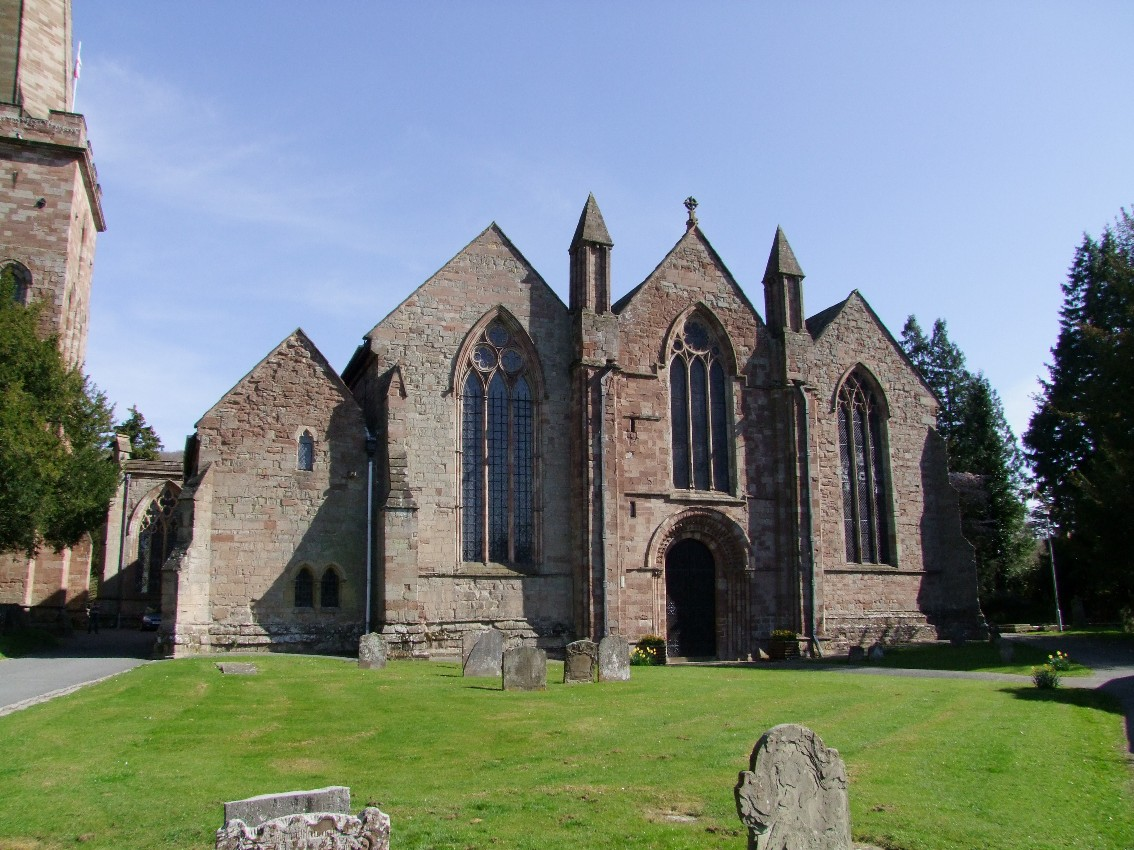
- St Michael and All Angels Church in Ledbury, where Katherine lived as an anchoress.

Anchoress, hermit
- Born: 1271; Brimpsfield, Gloucestershire, England
- Residence: Ledbury, Herefordshire, England
- Died: Sometime after 1326/7
- Major shrine: Possibly the Chapter House, the Church of St Michael and All Angels, Ledbury, Herefordshire, England
- Feast: 7 October (Diocese of Hereford); 25 November, derived from the earlier feast of Catherine of Alexandria
- Attributes: ringing bells, the footprints of her stolen horse, clairvoyance, herbs and milk
- Patronage: Ledbury, Herefordshire, England

Katherine of Ledbury (also known as Katherine de Audley or St Katherine of Ledbury; born 1272) was a Gloucestershire-born noblewoman of the 13-14th centuries who became an anchoress in Ledbury, Herefordshire. Although never officially canonised, Katherine was the subject of William Wordsworth's sonnet, “St. Catherine of Ledbury,” and is remembered as a patron saint of that town. She has often been confused with the 4th-century martyr, Catherine of Alexandria, whose cult in Ledbury preexisted hers.

== Life ==
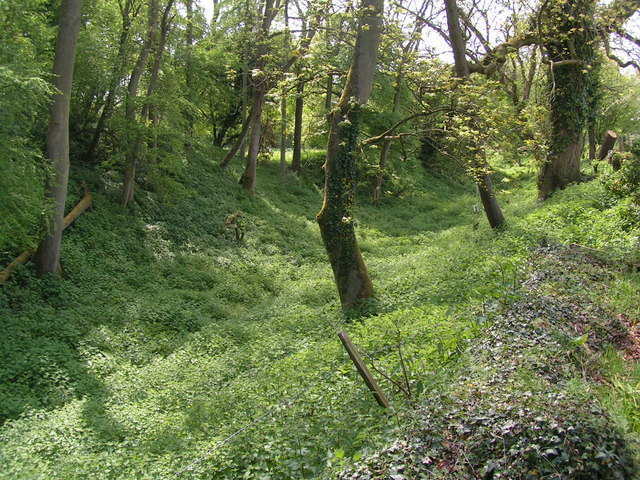
The site of Brimpsfield Castle in Gloucestershire, Katherine's birthplace.

Katherine was born in 1271 in Brimpsfield, Gloucestershire, to John Giffard, 1st Baron Giffard, the owner of Brimpsfield Castle, and Maud de Longspée, a great-granddaughter of King John. In 1287 or 1288, when Katherine was 15 or 16 years old, she married Baron Nicholas de Audley and had two sons and a daughter, the first when she was 17 years old. After both her husband and her father died in 1299, she came into a large inheritance, including lands and property in Carmarthenshire, Shropshire, Staffordshire, and Cheshire.

She later became an anchoress in Ledbury. Various sources suggest she originally went missing on 25 February 1308, the day of King Edward II's coronation, before appearing in Ledbury as a recluse. The scholar Liz Herbert McAvoy has speculated that Katherine's disappearance and reappearance in Ledbury may have been an attempt to avoid being married to another lord after the death of her husband, which McAvoy claimed was common practice at that time. Indeed, McAvoy explained that Katherine must have been "one of the most desirable widows of the [Welsh border] region"; the fact that she didn't immediately remarry would have been unusual at the time, providing "fodder for a future mythologising of her life."

According to the antiquarian Rotha Mary Clay, Katherine gave away part of her maternal inheritance in 1312, and based on the location of the deed, it is likely she was already living in Ledbury and that the bishop had enclosed her as an anchoress in the Church of St Michael and All Angels, Ledbury. John Masefield clarified these claims, stating that in November 1308, Katherine had obtained a license to grant her dower-lands to her son Nicholas in return for an annual payment of £100 for her sustenance. Masefield concluded this may have been "her first step toward withdrawal from the world."

It is not known where Katherine lived between the death of her husband and her appearance in Ledbury. Masefield speculated she may have wandered, looking for a place to rest, as various legends suggest, or she may have taken up residence in one of her properties in Newport, Shropshire, or Llandovery, Carmarthenshire. Masefield claimed she may eventually have moved to the Farm or Mill of the Hazels, which Ledbury folklore identifies as the place she lived before building a hermitage at the parish church:

The lane or path by which [Katherine and her maid Mabel] went to and from the Church was called Mabel's Furlong; much of it is still in use as a road and bears the name on the maps. A field directly to the south of it is called Katherine's Acre.

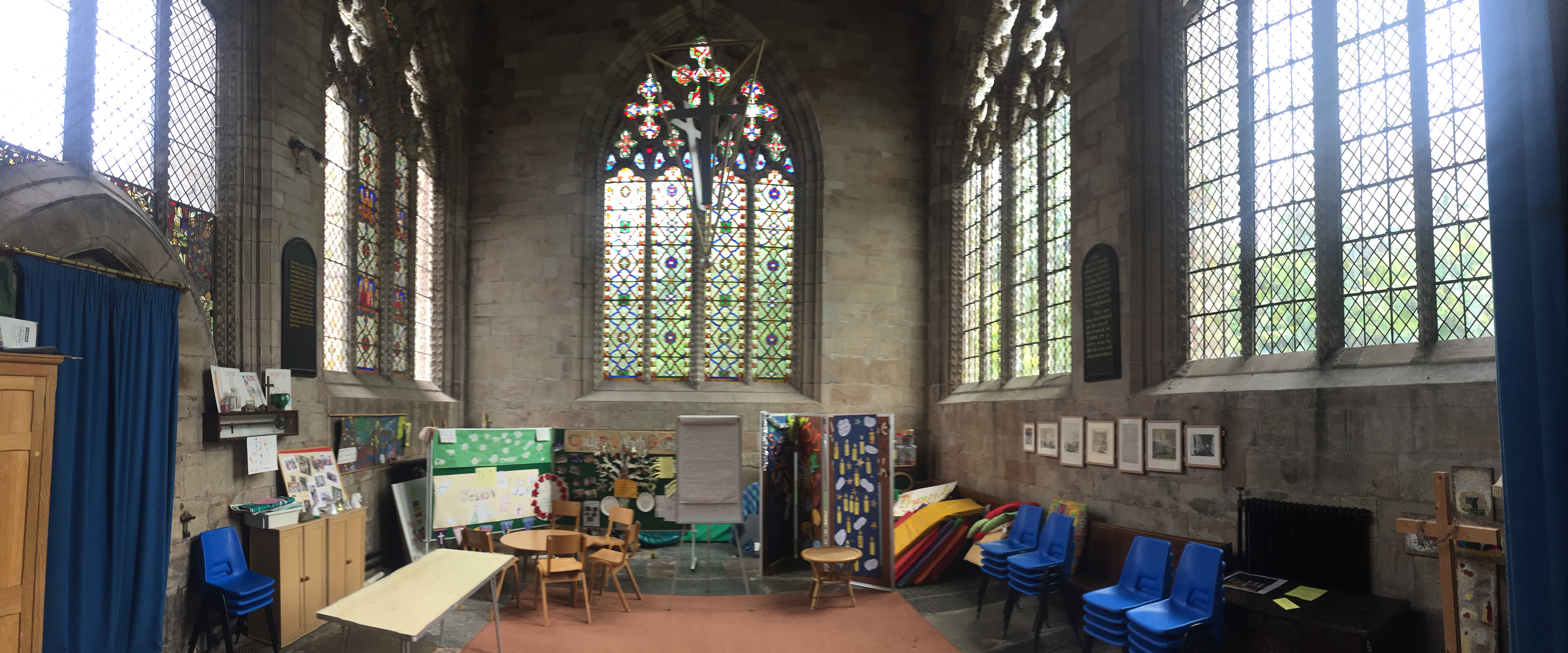
Photograph of the interior of St Katherine's Chapel, also called the Chapter House, in St Michael and All Angels’ Church, which may have been built as a shrine to Katherine in anticipation of a canonisation that never occurred.

Other sources, however, have suggested that Katherine did not live at the farm but sent her maid there to fetch the milk she sometimes drank.

On 7 October 1313 Katherine granted her lands in Carmarthenshire to her daughter and son-in-law. Masefield concluded that at this time, she was living in Ledbury but was not yet a recluse. At some point between then and 1323, her life as an anchoress began: she was first referred to as a "recluse" on a deed dated 1323 in which she was allotted an annuity of £30 through the sheriff of Hereford, “the sums being paid,” according to Clay, “out of lands which were in the custody of her husband's executor.” Clay concluded that Katherine had made arrangements about her property in order to obtain a pension that would fund her life as an anchoress.

During the final years of Katherine's life, the source of funding that supported her anchoritic life was mismanaged, paid haphazardly, and sometimes fraudulently stolen, leading Liz Herbert McAvoy to wonder if she lived her final years as an anchoress in poverty, depending largely on alms from the Ledbury community.

== Veneration ==
=== Legends ===
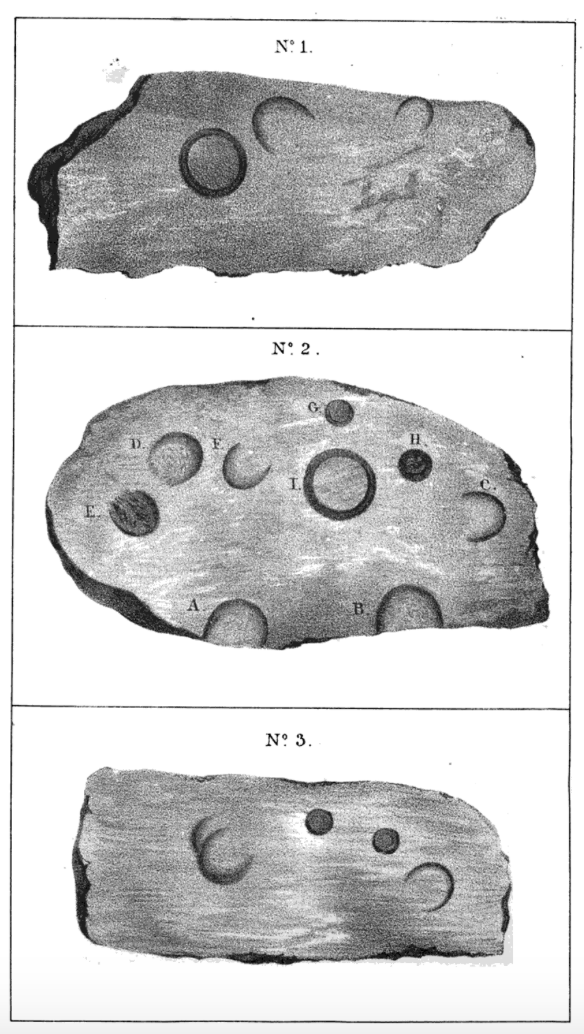
Jabez Allies' 1835 sketch of animal markings found in Whelpley Brook, which legend attributed to Katherine's stolen mare and colt.

Legends have attributed clairvoyance and a miraculous power of prayer to Katherine. One Ledbury legend has it that Katherine chose to come to Ledbury because a vision had shown her she must not rest until she arrived at a place where the church bells rang unaided. According to Rotha Mary Clay, the legend narrates that Katherine and her maid Mabel “wandered from place to place, following out of Worcestershire into Herefordshire the hoof-marks of [Katherine's] mare which had been stolen.” The antiquarian Jabez Allies recounted that, in the version of the legend he'd heard, Katherine had prayed in response to the theft, and both the thief's footprints and the horse's hoof-prints had become "deeply indented, not only in the earth, but also in the stones wherever they trod." The antiquarian later drew a sketch of the supposed marks, which he claimed to have found in the sandstone rocks of Whelpley Brook in Herefordshire and which the locals called the "tracks of St. Catherine's Mare and Colt." He later claimed that local people also said the marks in the stones were a "representation of the loaves which Saint Catherine used to give to the poor." The stones themselves were for many years used by local people as charms or safeguards against robbery, and according to the Saturday Review, people continued to believe the story of Katherine and her mare into the early 19th century.

Having continued her journey and reached the village of Bosbury, Katherine heard the bells ringing and sent Mabel to identify the cause. She said she knew "she was to end her days at some place whose name terminated with bury." When Mabel returned and said the bells were being rung for a wedding, Katherine said this was not the place, and they continued on their journey. It was only upon reaching Ledbury that Katherine finally heard the church bells ringing of their own accord and decided to remain “under the shadow of the bell-tower” as an anchoress. After building a hermitage at the church, she was said to have lived on herbs and milk. The stone upon which Katherine was said to have been sitting when she heard the bells ring, and which was known by locals as Katherine's Stone, could for many years be seen in the area of land near the church known as Katherine's Acre before it was finally removed.

Another legend, repeated in the Worcester News, suggests that the fortunes of the town of Ledbury are linked to a prophecy of Katherine's:

Legend has it that, before her death, [Katherine] declared that the door to the [St Katherine] chapel should never be opened by human hands, but should always be allowed to open by itself. If this direction had been followed, Ledbury would have become "the richest town in England." But drunken revellers disobeyed her instructions, and the town had to make do with a more modest, though not an unprosperous future.

Liz Herbert McAvoy also referred to a legend suggesting that Katherine was "the object of erotic desire for both Edward II and Roger de Mortimer," although she dismissed the truth of this legend as unlikely. The Victorian author Compton Reade mentioned an account of Katherine's life in which she is described as a former "pious superintendent" of St Katherine's Almshouses in Ledbury.

=== Cult ===
Katherine was not formally canonised but was known, according to John Masefield, as "a very good woman." There is, however, speculation that the Chapter House of St Michael and All Angels Church in Ledbury was built as a shrine to Katherine.

The Diocese of Hereford celebrates a memorial of Katherine on October 7 (the day Katherine dispossessed herself of her properties in preparation to become a recluse). The Encyclopædia Britannica Eleventh Edition has also mentioned the following feast day of a "St Catherine Audley": "In Celtic and English martyrologies (November 25) there is also commemorated St Catherine Audley (c. 1400), a recluse of Ledbury, Hereford, who was reputed for piety and clairvoyance." Masefield, however, attributed the existence of this feast day, which he said was mentioned in a book of English saints, to a confusion of Katherine with Catherine of Alexandria, whose much earlier attested feast day is also November 25.

Rotha Mary Clay has suggested that Katherine's sainthood came about as a result of confusion between her identity and that of the earlier Catherine, for whom a chapel, hospital, and almshouse in the town were named many years before Katherine de Audley was born. Masefield has conjectured that Katherine may even have been named after the original St Catherine, "from being born on her Day, or from some vow or other devotion that her parents had made or felt."

Liz Herbert McAvoy has emphasised the "correlation between these two women [St Catherine of Alexandria and Katherine de Audley] in the popular imagination," a correlation she ascribes to the fact that the life of St. Catherine was "deemed eminently suitable for the instruction of young women considering religious enclosure" and that Katherine de Audley was herself enclosed "less than 100 metres from the powerful establishment [St Katherine's Hospital] devoted to her saintly namesake."

== References in literature ==
=== Wordsworth's sonnet ===
In 1827, William Wordsworth wrote the sonnet “St. Catherine of Ledbury” after taking a trip to Ledbury from Brinsop Court in Herefordshire, 20 miles away, where he was staying with his family. According to Liz Herbert McAvoy, Mary and Dorothy Wordsworth, the poet's wife and sister, had been staying near Ledbury for some time before Wordsworth arrived; she therefore speculated that the two women had informed the poet of the local legend of the bells. The poem, published in 1835 and described by Alexandra Walsham of Cambridge University as "a salutary reminder of the role played by poets and scholars in the invention and reinvention of lapsed traditions," immortalised the legend of Katherine and the bells:

ST. CATHERINE OF LEDBURY
When human touch (as monkish books attest)
Nor was applied nor could be, Ledbury bells
Broke forth in concert flung adown the dells,
And upward, high as Malvern's cloudy crest;
Sweet tones, and caught by a noble lady blest
To rapture! Mabel listened at the side
Of her loved mistress; soon the music died.
And Catherine said, Here I set up my rest.
Warned in a dream, the wanderer long had sought
A home that by such miracle of sound
Must be revealed: she heard it now, or felt
The deep, deep joy of a confiding thought;
And there, a saintly anchoress, she dwelt
Till she exchanged for heaven that happy ground.

=== John Masefield's book ===
In 1951, the incumbent Poet Laureate of the United Kingdom, John Masefield, who was also a native of Ledbury, learned that the bells of the local parish church were in need of repair and, as the parish was lacking funds to pay for them, would soon fall silent. Masefield wrote the book St. Katherine of Ledbury and Other Ledbury Papers and offered the money raised to the Ledbury Bell Fund. For the book's epigraph, he gave a Latin phrase often found inscribed on medieval bells, Sum rosa pulsata mundi Katerina vocata, meaning, "When struck, I am the Rose of the World, called Katherine."

Explaining his theory as to the origin of the legend of Katherine and the bells, Masefield pointed out that in the 13th century, village churches would not have been able to afford to house bells in a church tower, meaning it was far more likely Katherine had heard the ringing of a smaller consecration bell, which would have been fixed to a bell-cote outside either the church or the chapel of St Catherine of Alexandria in the town. Masefield pointed out that Ledbury is situated in one of England's only earthquake zones; he therefore believed it was likely that the legend arose from a real historical event: an earthquake had caused the consecration bell to ring without the aid of human hands, and Katherine, perhaps inside the chapel of St Catherine, had witnessed that no bell ringer was ringing the bell and took it as a sign she should remain in Ledbury.

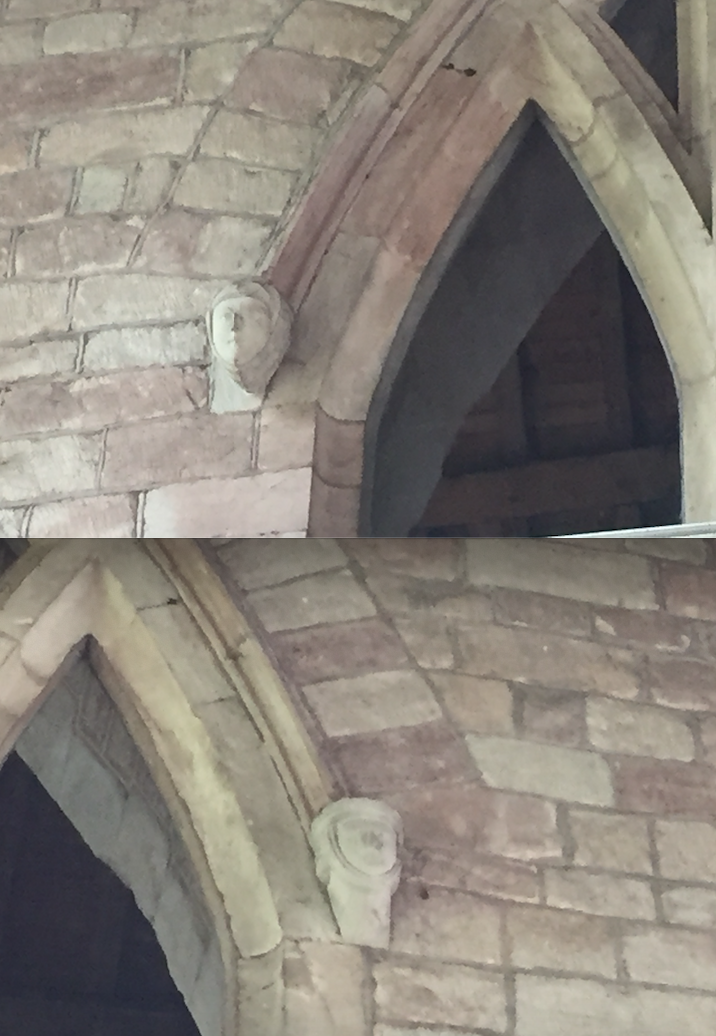
The western and eastern corbels on the archway of St Katherine's Chapel in St Michael and All Angels' Church, Ledbury. John Masefield speculated that the eastern corbel (bottom) depicted Katherine de Audley and that the western depicted her maid Mabel.

Masefield also believed the legendary words Katherine spoke when she heard the bells ring, "Here I set up my rest," reflected a historical reality: at the Ritual of Enclosure when she began her life as an anchoress, according to the Exeter use, Katherine would have said the words, "Be this my rest for ever and ever."

With regard to the side chapel bearing Katherine's name in St Michael and All Angels Church, Masefield believed it was built over the site of her hermitage and tomb. He mentioned that the chapel has no altar and that this might suggest it had been intended as a shrine to Katherine:

There is no altar in the Chapel. I have been told that this is perhaps a sign, that when the Chapel was built there was some talk or thought of canonising her, and that pending the appeal no altar was consecrated there. I know not what evidence there may be of this.

Masefield also mentioned the "harmless pleasure" he took in believing that the heads of two women that can be seen carved into the chapel's arch are portraits of Katherine and her maid Mabel:

In that beautiful Chapel the corbels of the arch under which the visitor enters from the Church's North Aisle, are carved with the heads of women. Both heads seem to me to be portraits. The head upon the western corbel seems that of a visionary; that upon the eastern corbel, though most beautiful and benign, is of one still in the world.

== See also ==
- Anchorite
- Ancrene Wisse
- Petrosomatoglyph
- Tedstone Delamere
