= John Giffard, 1st Baron Giffard =

13th-century English nobleman of the Second Barons' War

John Giffard, Baron Giffard of Brimsfield (1232–1299) was an English nobleman prominent in the Second Barons' War and in Wales. His initial gift of land in Oxford led to the foundation of Gloucester College, Oxford.

== Involvement in military actions ==
Giffard was active in the campaigns against Llywelyn ap Gruffudd in 1257–1258 and 1260–1261. In 1263, with others of Simon de Montfort's party, Giffard besieged the sheriff of Gloucester in Gloucester Castle. Also in that year, with others, he abducted Peter of Aigueblanche, the Bishop of Hereford, confining him to Eardisley Castle.

In 1264 Giffard controlled Kenilworth Castle, and successfully attacked Warwick Castle, occupied by William Maudit, 8th Earl of Warwick. Captured at the Battle of Lewes, he changed sides, and fought for Henry III at the Battle of Evesham in 1265. After Lewes, Giffard joined the retinue of Gilbert de Clare, earl of Gloucester and Hertford, and his association with the powerful Marcher Lord was rewarding in money and property.

Giffard was subsequently a staunch king's man, for Henry and Edward I. He fought at the decisive Battle of Orewin Bridge (1282). Edward granted him Welsh castles, including Carreg Cennen.

== Family ==
Giffard was born on 19 January 1232, the son of Elias Giffard IV of Brimpsfield, Gloucestershire and his second wife, Alice, sister of John Mautravers, of Lytchett Matravers, Dorset.

Giffard married, firstly, Maud de Clifford, daughter of Walter de Clifford, of Clifford, Herefordshire, and widow of William III Longespée. He caused a scandal, for which he was heavily fined, in 1271 when he abducted her while negotiations for the marriage were in progress. Their daughter, Katherine, married Nicholas Audley (1258–1299), son of Ela Longespée and James de Audley. Their daughter Eleanor married Fulk le Strange, 1st Baron Strange of Blackmere.

Giffard married secondly, in 1286, Margaret, widow of John de Neville, of Hallingbury, Essex. Margaret was a granddaughter of Ralph Belet and Sibyl de Cormeilles. Their son John (1287–1322) was executed by Edward II as a rebel, and Brimpsfield Castle was destroyed.

Giffard died at his house at Boyton, Wiltshire, on 29 May 1299 and was buried at Malmesbury Abbey.

== Sources ==
- Crouch, David. "Giffard, John, first Lord Giffard". Oxford Dictionary of National Biography (online ed.). Oxford University Press. doi:10.1093/ref:odnb/10651. (Subscription, Wikipedia Library access or UK public library membership required.)
- Complete Peerage, Volume 5, pp. 639–44

Peerage of England
New creation	Baron Giffard; 1295–1299	Succeeded by John Giffard
