= Osbern Giffard =

Norman landowner

- Born: c. 1020; Longueville-le-Giffard, Duchy of Normandy
- Died: c. 1085; Brimpsfield, Gloucestershire
- Father: Osborn/Osberne/Osborne/Osbern de Bolebec, Lord of Bolebec
- Mother: either Avelina or Wevia (sisters of Gunnor, Duchess of Normandy)
- Occupation: landowner

Osbern (or Osborne) Giffard (c. 1020 – c. 1085) was one of the knights who invaded England in 1066 under William the Conqueror. He was rewarded with holdings throughout Gloucestershire, Hampshire, Wiltshire and Somerset. He settled in Brimpsfield, Gloucestershire, where he built a castle which was destroyed by Edward II in 1322. It is believed that the Gloucestershire village of Stoke Gifford is named after him.

== Family ==
Giffard was a son of Osborn (or Osberne or Osborne or Osbern) de Bolebec, Lord of Longueville-le-Giffard by either Avelina/Aveline, sister of Gunnor, Duchess of Normandy He secondly married Hawsie. One of Giffard's siblings was Walter Giffard, Lord of Longueville.

Giffard's notable descendants include the sons of Hugh Giffard of Boyton in Wiltshire: Walter Giffard and Godfrey Giffard.
