= Ledbury =

Town in Herefordshire, England

Coordinates: 52.0339°N 2.4235°W

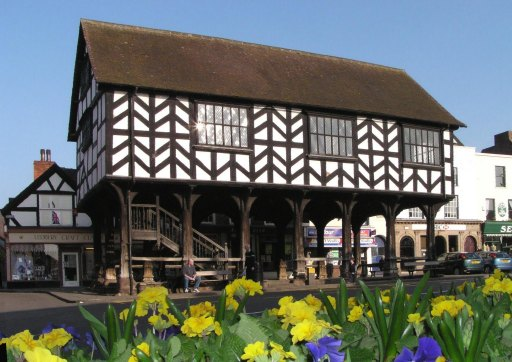
- Ledbury Market Hall

- Location within Herefordshire
- Population: 9,109 (2021)
- OS grid reference: SO710373
- Civil parish: Ledbury
- Unitary authority: Herefordshire
- Ceremonial county: Herefordshire
- Region: West Midlands
- Country: England
- Sovereign state: United Kingdom
- Post town: LEDBURY
- Postcode district: HR8
- Dialling code: 01531
- Police: West Mercia
- Fire: Hereford and Worcester
- Ambulance: West Midlands
- UK Parliament: North Herefordshire

Ledbury is a market town and civil parish in the county of Herefordshire, England, lying east of Hereford, and west of the Malvern Hills. Its population was 9,109 at the 2021 UK census.

It has a significant number of Tudor-style timber-framed structures, in particular along Church Lane and High Street. One of the most outstanding is Ledbury Market Hall, built in 1617, located in the town centre. Other notable buildings include the parish church of St Michael and All Angels, the Painted Room (containing 16th-century frescoes), the Old Grammar School, the Barrett-Browning memorial clock tower (designed by Brightwen Binyon and opened in 1896 to house the library until 2015), nearby Eastnor Castle and the St Katherine's Hospital site. Founded c. 1231, this is a rare surviving example of a hospital complex, with hall, chapel, a Master's House (fully restored and opened in March 2015 to house the Library), almshouses and a timber-framed barn.

== History ==
Ledbury is a borough whose origins date to around AD 690. In the Domesday Book of 1086 it was recorded as Liedeberge. It may take its name from the River Leadon on which it stands. Old English burg (fortified or defended site) has been added to the river name.

As a town it was created on a bishop's manor, probably, like Leominster, Bromyard and Ross-on-Wye, in the episcopate of Bishop Richard de Capella (1121–1127). It returned members to Parliament in the reign of Edward I. The Feathers Hotel was a famous 16th-century drovers' inn. It was not until the reign of Queen Elizabeth I that this 'poor town' became prosperous thanks mainly to three families of clothier merchants, Skynner, Skyppe, and Elton. No less than four battles were fought during the English civil wars, during which it was a bastion of royalism. The arrival of the Martin and Biddulph during the age of aristocracy and into the Victorian era signalled a financial sea-change for the town from these banker landowners; Biddulph was later ennobled.

In April 1645, during the English Civil War, a battle was fought at Ledbury between Royalist forces under Prince Rupert and Roundhead forces under Col Edward Massey, a veteran parliamentarian leader during the Siege of Gloucester. As Prince Rupert’s forces advanced north, towards Leicester, Massey’s forces barricaded the town, but were subsequently routed from Ledbury and pursued for many miles, losing 520 men. It was one of the last royalist victories of the First Civil War, Rupert’s army would later be comprehensively defeated at the Battle of Naseby.

Lord Biddulph lived in the Regency mansion Underdown, built in Ledbury Park by Anthony Keck in about 1780.

Ledbury was home to poet Elizabeth Barrett Browning, who spent her childhood at Hope End. It is also the birthplace of poet laureate John Masefield, after whom the local secondary school is named. William Wordsworth's 1835 sonnet St. Catherine of Ledbury, concerning a local anchoress called Katherine, begins "When ... Ledbury bells broke forth in concert". In 1901 St Katharine's priest was Charles Madison Green, whose wife, Ella, was the eldest sister of author H. Rider Haggard. During the 20th century the population stabilised, hardly growing at all to the Census of 1971. Becoming a prosperous town of small and independent traders, it relied heavily on agricultural industries. With the addition of the by-pass in 1989, the population rapidly expanded to nearly 10,000 in Census 2011.

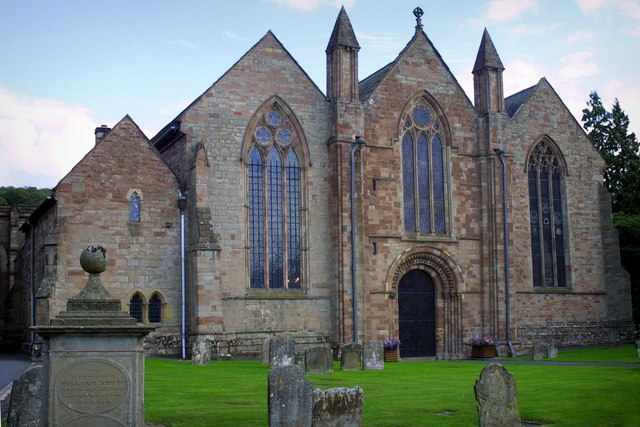
St Michael and All Angels' Church, Ledbury

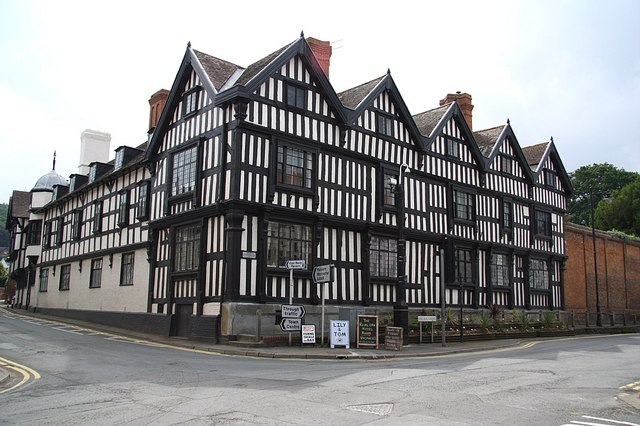
Ledbury Park, built ca. 1600 by the Biddulph family, has been called one of England's finest timber-framed houses

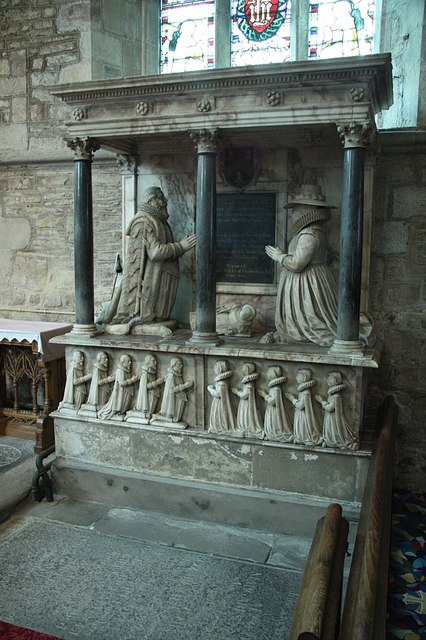
Funerary monument in St Michael and All Angels' Church, Ledbury

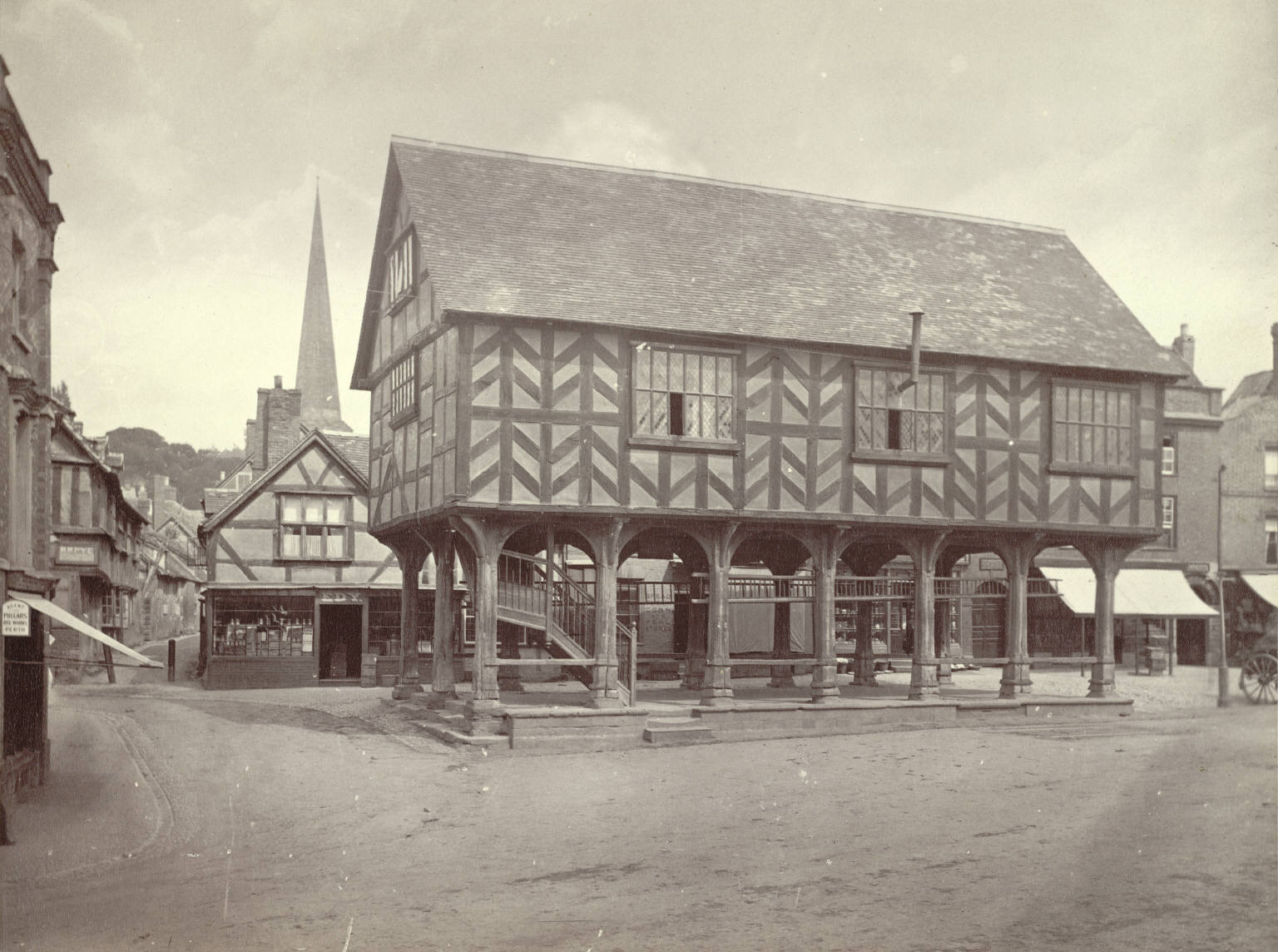
Ledbury Market Hall (3610782139)

The Herefordshire and Gloucestershire Canal, which opened from Gloucester as far as Ledbury in 1798, passed through the lower part of the town with wharves at Bye Street and at what is now the Ross Road near the Full Pitcher public house. After closing in 1885, part of the Ledbury-to-Gloucester section of the canal was used by the Great Western Railway for the Ledbury and Gloucester Railway. The original line of the canal northwards towards Hereford can still be seen, where it went underneath the Ledbury-to-Hereford railway. When the Gloucester railway closed in 1964 as a result of the Beeching cuts it became overgrown, but the route through Ledbury became a footpath. In 1997 a 1.6-mile (2.6 km) section from the bypass/Ross Road roundabout to the railway station was upgraded to a 2-metre (7 ft) wide path with a surface of compacted limestone chippings that could be utilised by cyclists and wheelchair users. Several access points were created, trees thinned out but retained, and the Hereford Road Skew Bridge across the A438 was reopened. The proposed bridge to take the Town Trail (as it is now known) across the B4214 Bromyard Road into the station yard was not built. The Trail ends at the Hereford/Bromyard road junction.

Ledbury Town Halt railway station opened in 1885 and closed in 1959.

== Governance ==
Ledbury forms part of three electoral wards of Herefordshire Council. It has a town council, a town clerk, a mayor and a town crier. The town crier opens events such as the annual Christmas Lights Switch-On. The chair is Cllr Elizabeth Harvey. Ledbury is one of four market towns (the others being Leominster, Bromyard and Kington) in the North Herefordshire parliamentary constituency. Prior to 2010, it was part of the predecessor constituency, Leominster.

== Transport ==
The main roads through the town are the A449 and the A417; the M50 motorway runs to the south.

Ledbury railway station is near the western end of the Cotswold line and offers direct services to Hereford, Worcester, Birmingham, Oxford and London Paddington. Services are operated by West Midlands Railway and Great Western Railway.

Bus services are operated primarily by First Worcester and DRM Bus; routes connect the town with Hereford, Ross-on-Wye and Worcester.

== Media ==
Local news and television programmes are provided by BBC West Midlands and ITV Central. Television signals are received from the Ridge Hill TV transmitter. Local radio stations are BBC Hereford and Worcester, Hits Radio Herefordshire & Worcestershire, Greatest Hits Radio Herefordshire & Worcestershire and Sunshine Radio. The town is served by the local newspaper, Ledbury Reporter which publishes on Fridays.

== Industry ==
For many years the Robertson's factory, a subsidiary of Rank Hovis McDougall, produced jam. Production was moved to Histon in Cambridgeshire in September 2007 following the parent company's acquisition by Premier Foods. The site is now used by Universal Beverages to process fruit for cider producers such as Bulmer's and includes two giant fermentation tanks, each capable of holding 800,000 litres.

Ledbury is home to Amcor's flexible-packaging manufacturing plant. This has been awarded both the 'Carbon Reduction Cost-Saving Award - over 250 employees' and 'Most Promising New Low-Carbon Product / Service Award - over 250 employees' in the West Midlands Low-Carbon-Economy 2010 awards.

Ledbury has an income from tourism, being steeped in history in a rural area, with pubs for visitors and locals alike.

== Recreation ==
The town is the venue for various events including the Ledbury Poetry Festival. The annual Community Day takes place in June each year. The first such event was an Ox Roast on 2 June 2013 to commemorate the diamond jubilee of Queen Elizabeth II's coronation, exactly 60 years after an ox roast that was held in 1953 in Ledbury on Coronation Day.

The Big Chill at nearby Eastnor Castle, which brought thousands of people to the area each year closed after the August 2011 event. Eastnor Castle has provided the backdrop to a number of films, including 1970's One More Time, starring Jerry Lewis and Sammy Davis Jr. BBC television filmed some scenes for The Prince and the Pauper starring Nicholas Lyndhurst in 1976.

The Market Theatre, reputed to be the first in the world to open in the new millennium, is situated near the town centre. It has been built on the site of the former Church Room (a typical 'tin tabernacle' constructed in 1910, which became a theatre in 1956, with a change of name to the Market Theatre in the 1970s). From 1963 (following the demolition of the Kemble Theatre in Hereford, which was named after theatre manager Roger Kemble) until 1979, this little building was the only theatre in Herefordshire. Ledbury Amateur Dramatic Society (LADS) runs the Theatre, mounting several of its own productions a year. They show films and live screenings on a regular basis, and play host to small and mid-scale professional touring shows, including events in the Poetry Festival. There are a number of singing groups, including the Choral Society and the Community Choir the latter with over 60 members. In 2000, Ledbury formed a twinning association with the Swedish^{[28]} town of Strömstad. Since then, several cultural and sporting exchanges have taken place between the two: the junior football club, Ledbury Swifts makes an annual trip there. The hunts (Ledbury, which dates from 1846, and North Ledbury, established in 1905) used to be well supported. The Hunting with Dogs Act 2004 banned the country pursuit, which angered local people, a few of whom joined the Countryside Alliance to register their protest.

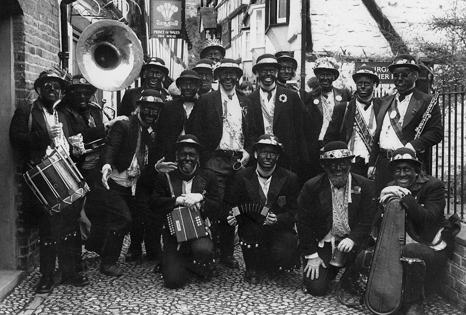
Silurian Border Morrismen in Church Lane

The town is home to the Silurian Border Morrismen.

== Folklore ==
At Tedstone Delamere the Sapey Brook runs its course to Upper Sapey. A story is told of a stolen mare and colt whose hoofprints stopped at the bank of the brook. The owner was Saint Catherine of Ledbury who prayed for their safe return and, upon examining the bed of the brook, saw hoofprints clearly visible in the rocky bottom. These were followed and the thief caught, the horses being safely recovered. A local pastime was once the creation of fake hoofprints for visitors; the original petrosomatoglyphs are visible in the brook to this day, attributed by experts to archaeology.

== Notable people ==
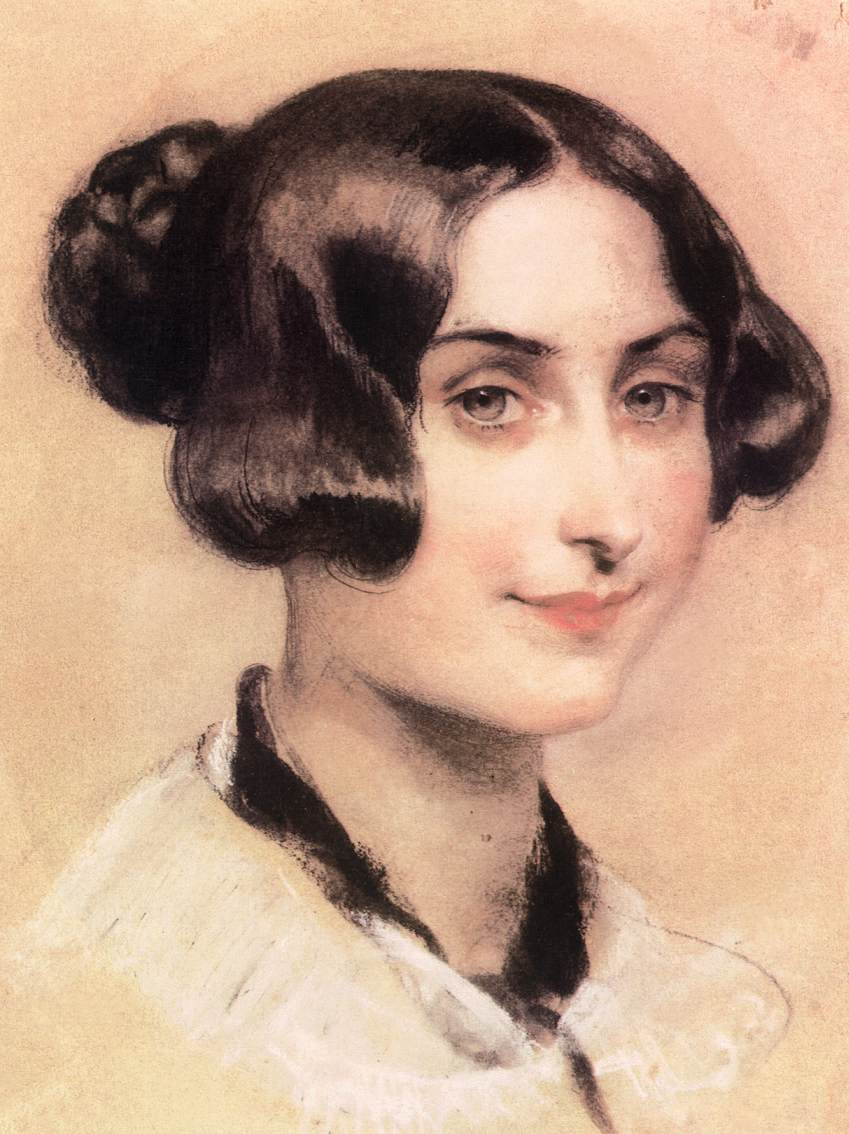
Elizabeth Barrett Browning, ca. 1840

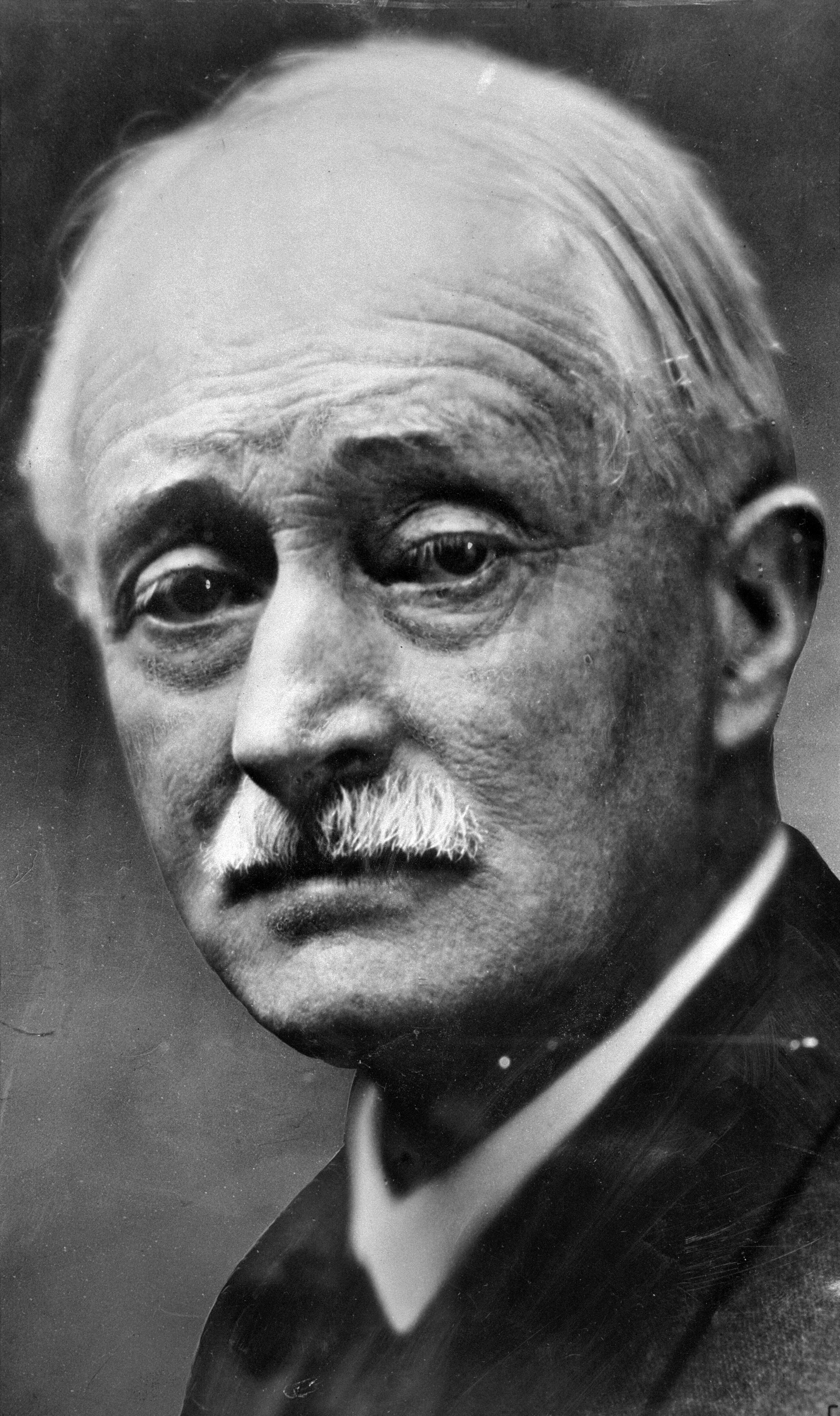
John Masefield, 1936

- Katherine of Ledbury (born 1272), an anchoress (withdrew from secular society)
- William Langland (ca. 1330 – ca. 1386), the presumed author of Piers Plowman
- Robert Biddulph (1801–1864), politician, MP for Hereford, 1832 to 1837
- Elizabeth Barrett Browning (1806–1861), poet, lived locally as a child.
- John Henry Wood (1841–1914), an English entomologist
- Major-General Sir Elliott Wood (1844–1931), Army officer, who served in the Anglo-Egyptian War, the Sudan Campaign and the Second Boer War
- Henry Scott Holland (1847–1918), professor of divinity, theologian and preacher
- John Masefield (1878–1967), Poet Laureate from 1930 to 1967
- George Barrett (1888–1917), anarchist writer, public speaker, newspaper editor and journalist
- Terrick V. H. FitzHugh (1907–1990), film producer and genealogist from Much Marcle
- Conroy Maddox (1912–2005), surrealist painter, collagist, writer and lecturer
- Paul Stoddart (born 1955), Australian businessman, airline owner and former Minardi F1 team boss worked locally.
- Elizabeth Hurley (born 1965), actress and model, bought Donnington Hall, in 2012.
- Richard Ashcroft (born 1971), musician, lead singer of the Verve
- Melissa Johns (born 1990), actress, disability activist, played Imogen Pascoe on Coronation Street.
- Will Merrick (born 1993), screen and stage actor, played Alo Creevey in the E4 TV series Skins.

=== Sport ===
- James Crosbie Smith (1894–1980), cricketer, played 16 First-class cricket matches for Worcestershire.
- Mary Duggan (1925–1973), cricketer, played 17 Women's Test cricket matches, died locally in Colwall.
- Robin Gardner (1934–2023), cricketer, played 126 First-class cricket matches for Leicestershire.
- Steve Emery (born 1956), footballer who played over 370 games including 204 for Hereford United
- Terry Jenkins (born 1963), darts player, nicknamed the Bull
- Mary McAteer (born 2004), footballer who has played over 50 games and 7 for Wales women

== See also ==
- Ledbury Town F.C. - football club
- Ledbury Signal Box
