= Church of St Michael and All Angels, Ledbury =

Church of St Michael and All Angels
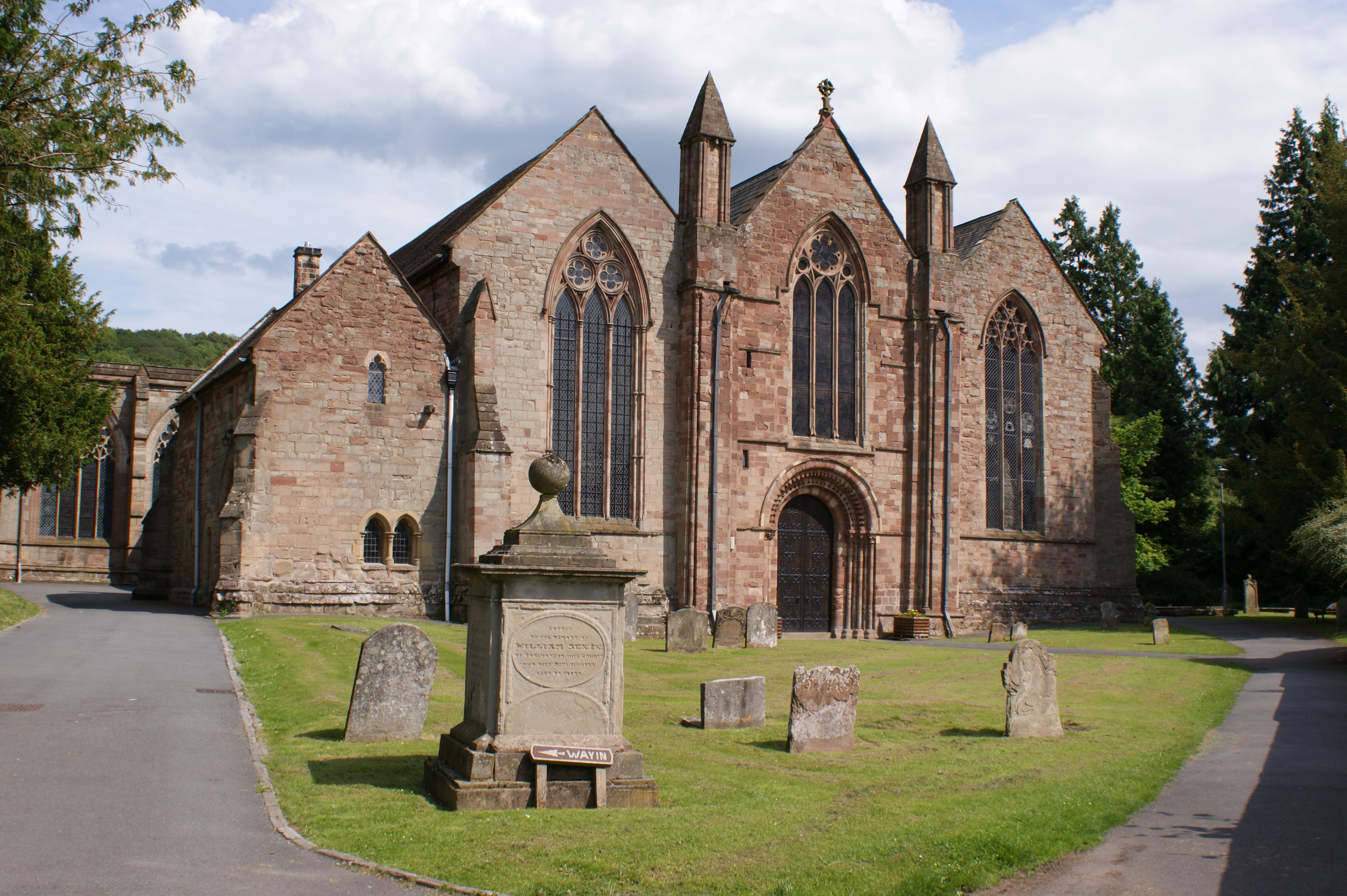
- Viewed from the west
- Church of St Michael and All Angels
- 52°2′13″N 2°25′12″W
- OS grid reference: SO 71281 37697
- Location: Ledbury, Herefordshire
- Country: England
- Denomination: Church of England

Architecture
- Heritage designation: Grade I
- Designated: 18 September 1953

Administration
- Province: Canterbury
- Diocese: Hereford
- Archdeaconry: Hereford
- Deanery: Ledbury
- Parish: Ledbury

The Church of St Michael and All Angels is an Anglican church in Ledbury, in Herefordshire, England. The oldest parts date from the 12th century, and most of the building is of the 13th and 14th centuries. It is Grade I listed, described in the listing text as "one of the finest churches in Herefordshire".

== Description ==
The Domesday Book of 1086 records a minster church in Ledbury, in a period before there were parish churches in villages. The oldest part of the present church, dating from the 12th century, are the centre of the west front including the door surround, and the chancel. High on the walls of the chancel are circular windows, once part of a clerestory above low aisles in the original building, now seen from within high aisles.

The north aisle is of the 13th century; bases of pillars in the north arcade at the west end are thought to date from the earlier Norman church. The south aisle and arcade are of the 14th century.

The chapter house, north of the north aisle and facing the chancel, was built about 1320. It may have been built as a shrine to Katherine of Ledbury and was formerly called the Chapel of St Katherine.

Restoration in the 19th century included installation of stained glass windows, and replacement of the pews.

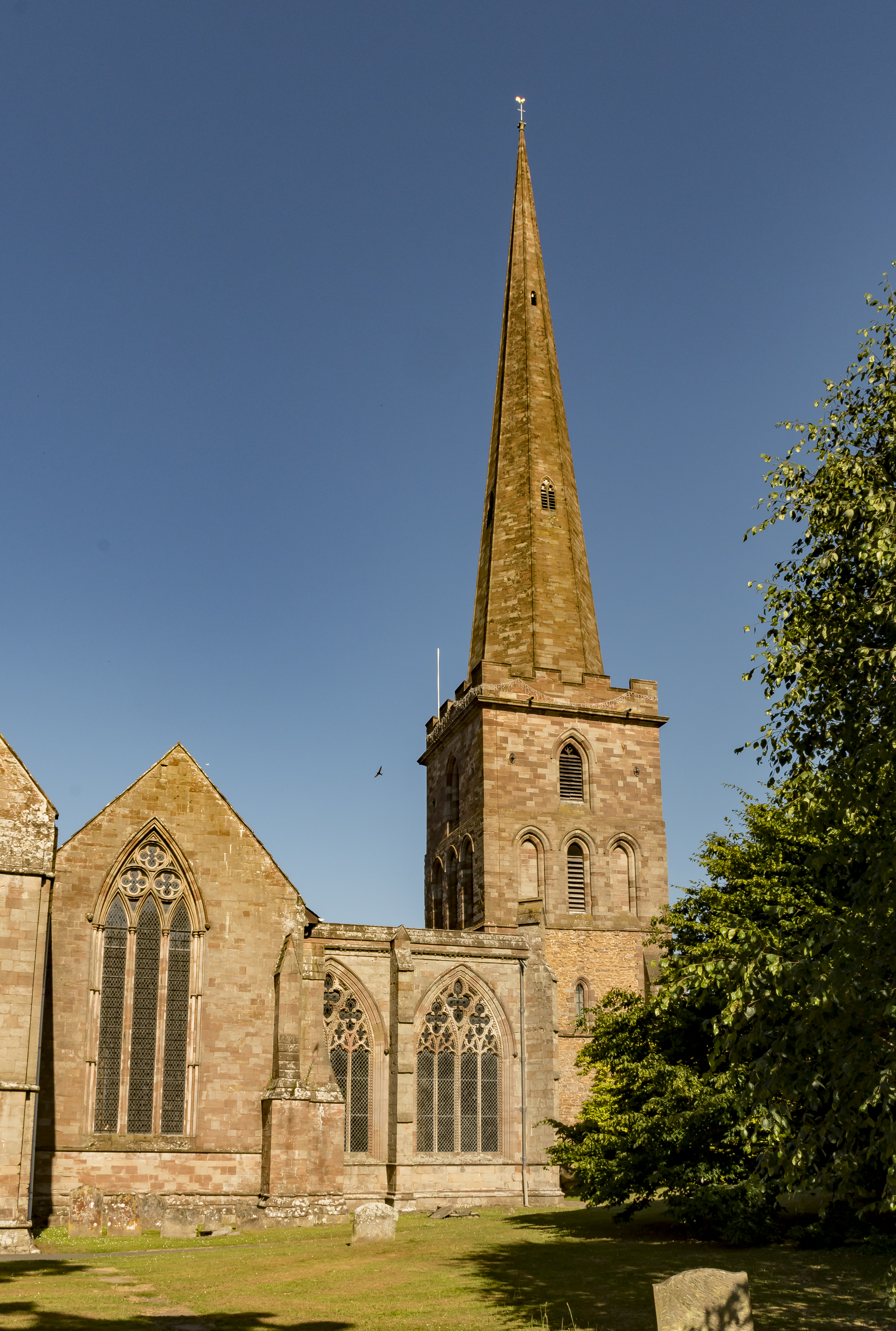
View from the east, showing the tower, chapter house and part of the east front

=== Tower ===
The tower, north of the church, is separate from the rest of the building, perhaps because a stream running under the church made the foundations not firm enough for a tower at the west end. It dates from about 1230 for three stages; a top stage with a single light on each side and battlements, and an octagonal stone spire, were built in 1732 by Nathaniel Wilkinson of Worcester, who rebuilt several church spires in nearby counties.

=== Memorials ===
The memorials inside the church include monuments to Daniel Ellis Saunders (died 1825) and Robert Myddelton Biddulph (1761–1814), both by Richard Westmacott; William Miles (died 1803) by John Flaxman; and Anthony Biddulph (died 1718) and his wife Constance (died 1706). On the south wall near the altar there is a 17th-century canopied monument to Edward and Elizabeth Skynner. The couple are shown kneeling, and a baby between them is a child who died young; below them are shown their five sons and five daughters who survived to adulthood.

== Organ ==
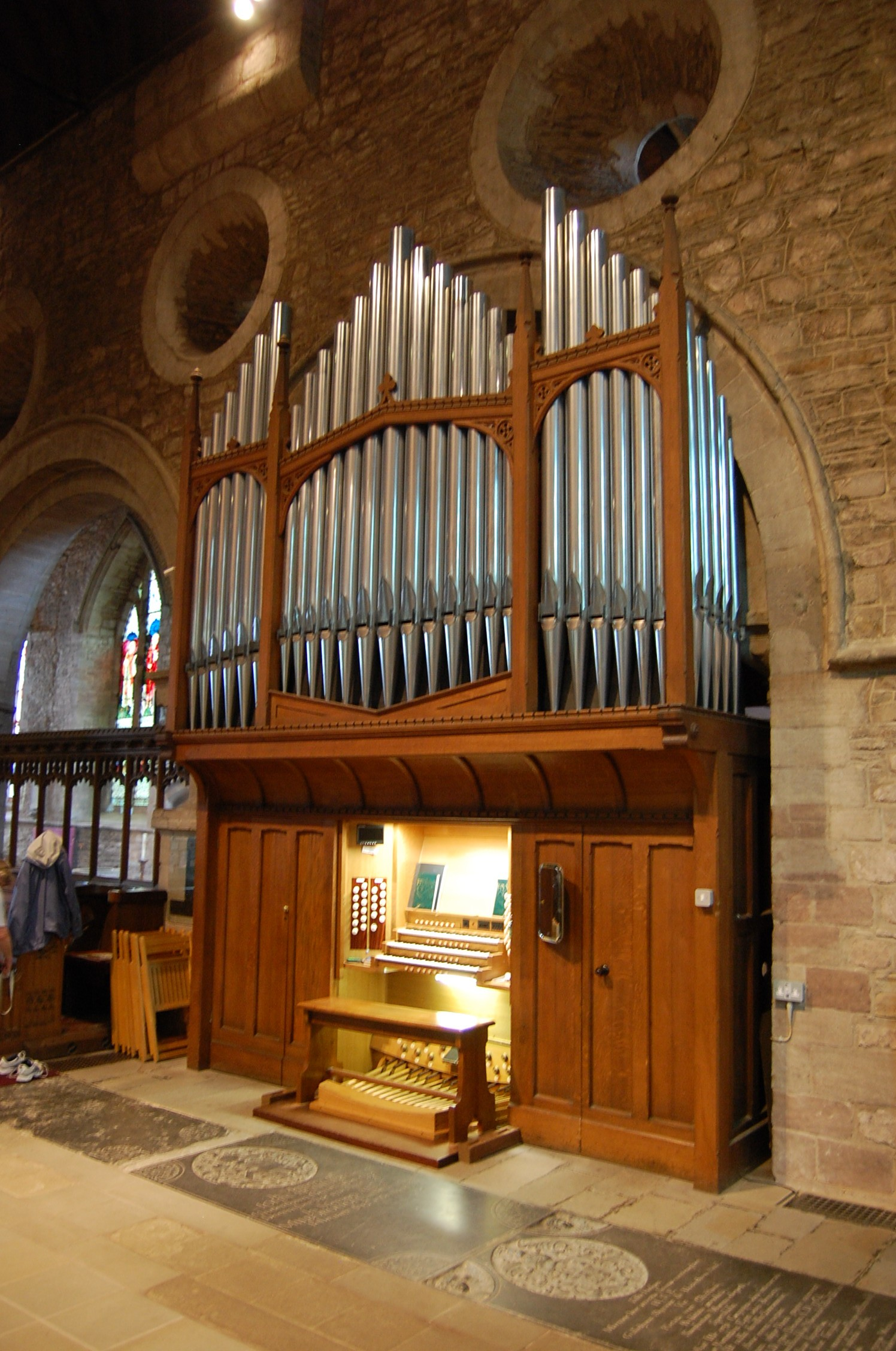
The organ in 2011

The church installed an organ by Thomas Elliot in 1820. This was substantially rebuilt and enlarged in 1863 by Nicholson & Co retaining only 6 ranks of pipe from the Elliot instrument on the Great manual. Later rebuilds were undertaken by Nicholson in 1970. The instrument now contains 3 manual and pedals with 39 speaking stops. It was renovated by Percy Daniel & Co of Clevedon in 2000.

== Bells ==
The tower contains a ring of 10 bells. Previously a ring of 8, it was expanded to 10 in 2020 with the addition of 2 bells by Westley Group. The tenor dating from 1736 by Abel Rudhall has a weight of 2,218 pounds (1,006 kg). The oldest bell is the 5th from 1705 by Abraham I Rudhall.

== The Last Supper ==
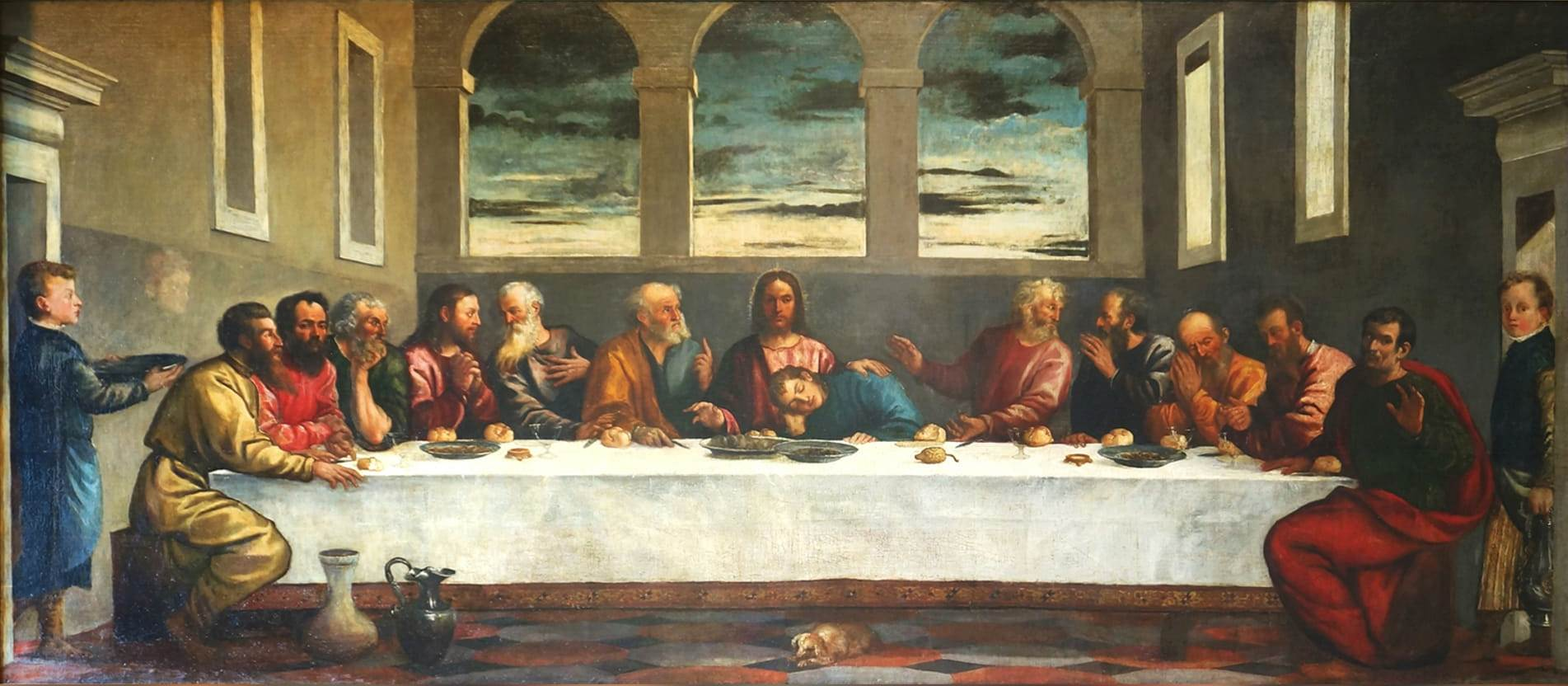
Titian and his workshop - Last Supper

The church contains a painting of the Last Supper probably dating from 1560 to 1580 which is the work of more than one Venetian artist including Titian. Ultra-violet light revealed the lettering TITIANVS.
