= Robin Gardner =

English cricketer and footballer

Personal information
- Full name: Leslie Robin Gardner
- Born: 23 February 1934; Ledbury, Herefordshire, England
- Died: 30 September 2023 (aged 89)
- Batting: Right-handed
- Bowling: Right-arm medium

Domestic team information
- Years: Team
- 1964–1966: Hertfordshire
- 1954–1962: Leicestershire

Career statistics
Competition	First-class	List A
Matches	126	2
Runs scored	4,119	16
Batting average	19.80	8.00
100s/50s	2/15	0/0
Top score	102*	14
Balls bowled	334	–
Wickets	5	–
Bowling average	39.80	–
5 wickets in innings	–	–
10 wickets in match	–	–
Best bowling	3/54	–
Catches/stumpings	63/–	1/–
- Source: Cricinfo, 29 November 2011

Leslie Robin Gardner (23 February 1934 – 30 September 2023) was an English cricketer and footballer. In cricket, Gardner was a right-handed batsman who bowled right-arm medium pace. He was born in Ledbury, Herefordshire.

Gardner made his first-class debut for Leicestershire against Cambridge University in 1954. In first-class cricket, Gardner appeared 126 times for Leicestershire between 1954 and 1962. In these 126 matches, he scored 4,119 runs at a batting average of 19.80, with a high score of 102 not out. This score was one of two centuries he made, with his 102 not out coming against the touring Australians in 1961. An inconsistent batsman, his most successful season was in 1959 when he made exactly 1,000 runs. Between the 1957 and 1960 seasons, he played 20 matches or more in each, passing 650 runs in each season. An able fielder, he took 63 catches. He left Leicestershire at the end of the 1962 season.

He joined Hertfordshire in 1964, making his debut for the county against Norfolk in the Minor Counties Championship. He played Minor counties cricket for Hertfordshire from 1964 to 1965, making sixteen appearances. He also made two List A appearances for the county, against Durham in the 1964 Gillette Cup and Berkshire in the 1966 Gillette Cup.

Outside of cricket, Gardner played football for Hereford United. He died in September 2023, aged 89.
