= James Crosbie Smith =

English cricketer (1894–1980)

James Smith
Personal information
- Born: September 26, 1894
- Died: February 19, 1980 (aged 85)
- Batting: Left-handed

Career statistics
| Competition | First-class |
|---|---|
| Matches | 16 |
| Runs scored | 313 |
| Batting average | 12.03 |
| 100s/50s | 0/1 |
| Top score | 70 |
| Catches/stumpings | 15/– |
- Source: CricketArchive, 10 October 2022

James Crosbie Smith (26 September 1894 – 19 February 1980) was an English first-class cricketer who played in 16 matches for Worcestershire in the 1920s.

In July 1924 at Kettering he and number 11 Harry Rogers put on 65 for the last wicket in Worcestershire's second innings against Northamptonshire. This proved vital as Worcestershire ran out winners by 25 runs. Smith's highest score of 70 had come earlier in his career, against Nottinghamshire at Amblecote in June 1923, but on that occasion his efforts had not affected the result of this game, with Worcestershire falling to a heavy defeat.

Smith was born in Ledbury, Herefordshire and died in the same town at the age of 85.
