= Brimpsfield Castle =

Castle in Brimpsfield, Gloucestershire, England

- Brimpsfield, Gloucestershire
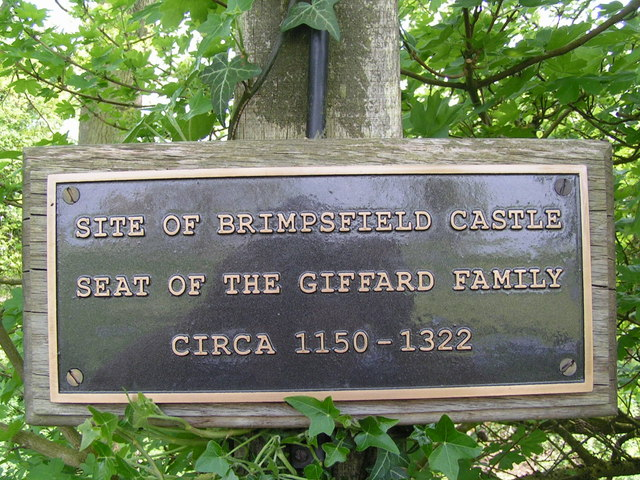
- Site of Brimpsfield Castle

Site information
- Type: Motte Castle
- Open to the public: Public footpaths cross the site

Scheduled monument
- Official name: Brimpsfield Castle Mound
- Designated: 17 August 1948
- Reference no.: 1003343
- Condition: Demolished, only earthworks remain

Location
- Coordinates: 51°48′50″N 2°5′10″W

Site history
- Built: 11th Century and rebuilt in stone in the mid 12th Century
- Demolished: 1322
- Battles/wars: Despenser War

Garrison information
- Past commanders: John Giffard, 2nd Lord of Brimpsfield (d.1322)

Brimpsfield Castle was a castle in the village of Brimpsfield in the county of Gloucestershire, England, between Gloucester and Cirencester.

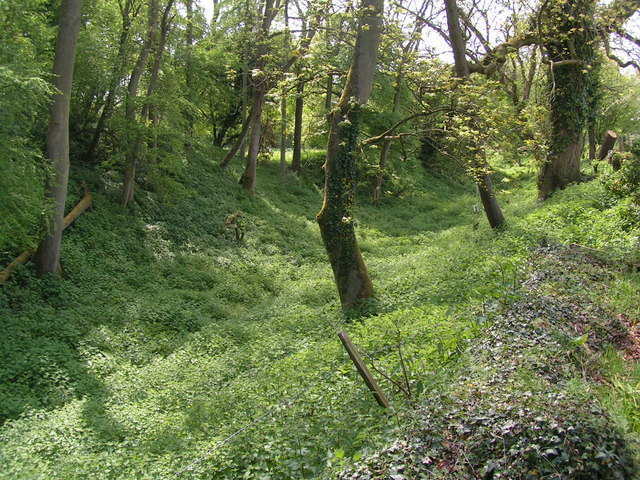
Brimpsfield Castle today

It is likely that the first castle was built after the Norman invasion. Then, in the 12th or 13th century, it was rebuilt in stone. The owner, John Giffard, 2nd Lord of Brimpsfield, rebelled against King Edward II and was executed in 1322. The castle was then slighted (partially destroyed).

Today the remains consist of a mound with an outer bank and ditch and the foundations of a gatehouse.

== See also ==
- Castles in Great Britain and Ireland
- List of castles in England
