= Brimpsfield =

Village in Gloucestershire, England

Coordinates: 51.80°N 02.10°W

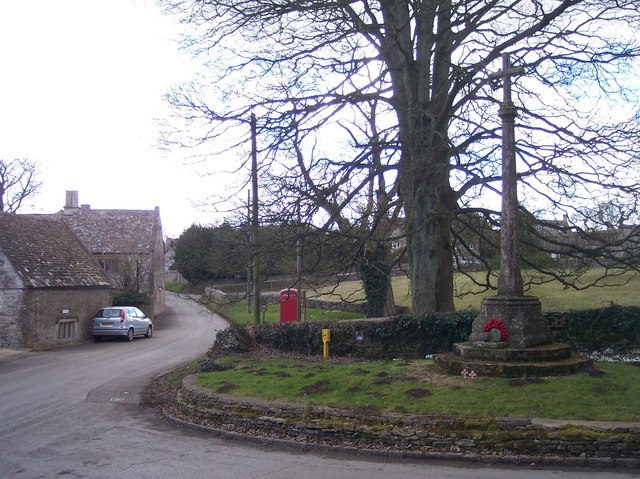
- Centre of Brimpsfield village

- Location within Gloucestershire
- Population: 310 (2021)
- OS grid reference: SO9312
- Shire county: Gloucestershire
- Region: South West
- Country: England
- Sovereign state: United Kingdom
- Post town: Gloucester
- Postcode district: GL4
- Police: Gloucestershire
- Fire: Gloucestershire
- Ambulance: South Western
- UK Parliament: North Cotswolds
- Website: Brimpsfield Parish Council

Brimpsfield is a village and civil parish in the Cotswold district, in the county of Gloucestershire, England.

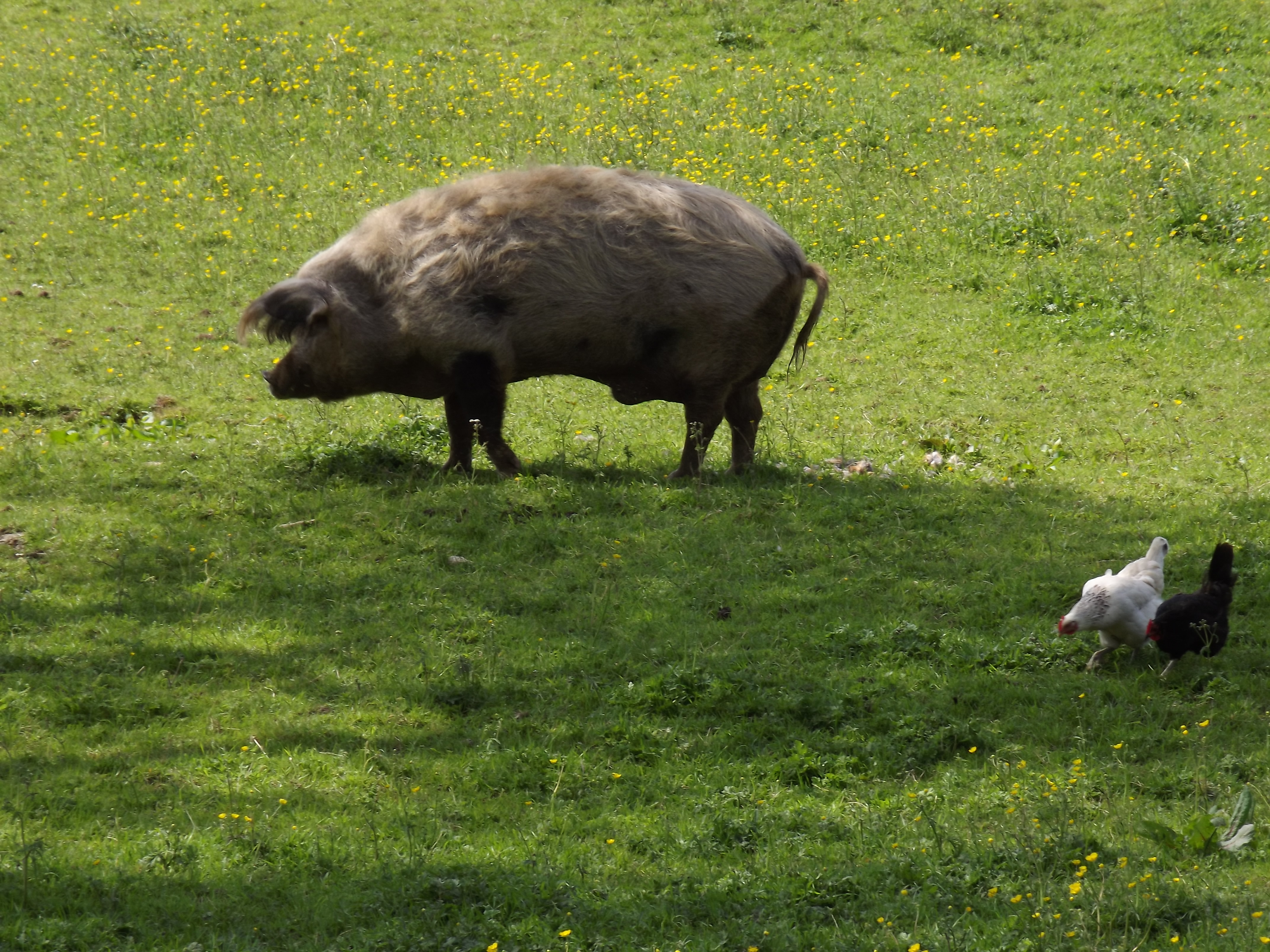
Livestock on Brimpsfield village green

The village is recorded in Domesday Book as Brimesfelde. Brimpsfield Castle was built in the village during the Norman period. The manor of Brimpsfield was granted to Maurice de Berkeley in 1339 by King Edward III.

The Church of St Michael was built in the 12th century. It is a grade I listed building.

A fictional Brimpsfield is the home village of Peter and Abby Grant in the 1970s BBC TV series Survivors; it is shown to have a railway connection to London.
