= List of preserved historic blast furnaces =

This list of preserved historic blast furnaces contains decommissioned blast furnaces, of which substantial remains survive. The furnaces are preserved in a park or museum, or as a site otherwise open to visitors, or intended to become such.

While pre-20th-century blast furnaces already have a long history of monument preservation, the perception of 20th century mass production blast furnace installations as industrial heritage is a comparably new trend. For a long time, it has been normal procedure for such a blast furnace to be demolished after being decommissioned and either be replaced with a newer, improved one, or to have the entire site demolished to make room for follow-up use of the area. It has only been in recent years that numerous countries have realized the value of blast furnaces as a part of their industrial history.

Historically, the first such blast furnace not to be demolished stands in Starachowice, Poland (decommissioned in 1968), followed by the last blast furnace of Yahata Steel Works in Yahatahigashi-ku, Kitakyūshū, Japan (decommissioned in 1972) and the "Carrie Furnaces" in Homestead, Pennsylvania in the United States (decommissioned in 1978). One of the two blast furnaces in Neunkirchen in Germany (decommissioned in 1982) was the first blast furnace worldwide to be not just preserved, but actively refurbished for the purpose of preservation.

For 20th-century mass production blast furnaces, the degree of accurate preservation versus integration into new structures, or even re-purposing, differs between the various sites. Colorful illumination installations at night are common.

== Historic pre-mass production ==
=== Australia ===
City and state	Name of location	Current purpose, preserved installations and public attractions	Photo	Official website
Lal Lal, Victoria	Lal Lal Iron Company	Furnace built in 1880, operated until 1884. Now part of the Lal Lal-Bungal Historic Area.		Parks Victoria
Beaconsfield, Tasmania	Ilfracombe Iron Company	Furnace built in 1873, abandoned from 1874. The furnace ruin exists on private property.		None
Bookham, New South Wales	Bogolong iron mine and blast furnace	Furnace built in 1873–1874, operated briefly in 1874. The blast furnace ruin exists on private property but is partially visible from public land adjoining Ilalong Road.		NSW Heritage Database

=== Austria ===
City	Name of location	Current purpose, preserved installations and public attractions	Photo	Official website
Thomatal, Tamsweg, Salzburg	Bergbaumuseum Hochofen Bundschuh (decommissioned in 1903, opened to the public in 1984)	The blast furnace (built in 1867) is now a museum.		

=== Brazil ===
City	Name of location	Current purpose, preserved installations and public attractions	Photo	Official website
Ipanema, Iperó, Sao Paulo	Fábrica de Ferro de São João do Ipanema (decommissioned in 1926, opened to the public in 1994)	Three blast furnaces, two built in 1817 and one in 1884, are now with Floresta Nacional de Ipanema.		

=== Finland ===
City	Name of location	Current purpose, preserved installations and public attractions	Photo	Official website
Karkkila	Högforsin ruukki	Blast furnace built 1820-1822. Decommissioned in 1916		Museovirasto

=== Germany ===
City	Name of location	Current purpose, preserved installations and public attractions	Photo	Official website
Between Grünebach and Alsdorf, Rhineland-Palatinate	Neugrünebacher Hütte (decommissioned in 1963)	The historic blast furnace has been put under monument conservation in 1983.		
Wenden, Sauerland, North Rhine-Westphalia	Wendener Hütte (decommissioned in 1866)	The casthouse, which contains the blast furnace, is now a museum.		
Balve, Sauerland, North Rhine-Westphalia	Luisenhütte Wocklum (decommissioned in 1865)	The casthouse, which contains the oldest completely preserved blast furnace in Germany, was declared a technical cultural monument 1950. Following an extensive two-year renovation, it was reopened as a museum in 2006.		
Bockenem-Bornum, Ambergau, Lower Saxony	Wilhelmshütte (decommissioned in 1966, opened to the public in 1982)	The historic blast furnace (built in 1783) is now a museum.		

=== Norway ===
City	Name of location	Current purpose, preserved installations and public attractions	Photo	Official website
Holt, Tvedestrand, Agder	Næs jernverk was in operation until 1959, when the waterworks were destroyed by a flood.	Næs jernverk is a museum since 1977 and guided tours of the ironworks and the blast furnace are provided for visitors.		

=== Poland ===
City	Name of location	Current purpose, preserved installations and public attractions	Photo	Official website
Chlewiska, Gmina Chlewiska, Szydłowiec County, Mazowieckie Voivodeship	Iron Works in Chlewiska (built between 1882 and 1892, decommissioned in 1940)	Chlewiska Iron Works is now part of the Museum of Technology and is opened for tourists.		
Kuźniaki, Gmina Strawczyn, Kielce County, Świętokrzyskie Voivodeship	Metallurgical Furnace in Kuźniaki (decommissioned in 1897)	The casthouse, which contains the blast furnace, has been declared a historical monument and is open to visitors.		
Samsonów, Gmina Zagnańsk, Kielce County, Świętokrzyskie Voivodeship	Huta Józef (decommissioned in 1866)	Installation was declared as a historical monument in 1967 and opened to visitors in 1983.		

=== Romania ===
City	Name of location	Current purpose, preserved installations and public attractions	Photo	Official website
Govăjdia, Hunedoara County	Blast Furnace in Govăjdia built between 1806 and 1810 on the site of an old iron working workshop called "Old Limpert", the furnace's capacity is 43,9 cubic meters and it operated with charcoal brought from Vadu Dobrii and the iron ore mined and brought from the iron ore mines at Ghelari via narrow-gauge railway. It was decommissioned in 1924 after the start of the ironworks at Hunedoara in 1884. This blast furnace is famous for providing iron for the steel of the Eiffel Tower in Paris, Some of the iron parts for the tower were made here.	The casthouse, which contains the blast furnace, has been declared a historical monument since 2000 and is open to visitors since 2007		

=== Slovakia ===
County	Name of location	Current purpose, preserved installations and public attractions	Photo	Official website
Zvolen, near village Osrblie	Tri vody (Three Waters)	The oldest blast furnace in the former Kingdom of Hungary. The blast furnace was built in 1795, and burnt charcoal as fuel. Fire in the 1882 destroyed the manufacture. Casing, which is 8.5 m long, is still preserved.		
Spiš	Jakubany	Jakubany (49°13’02’’N; 20°40’56’’E), Jakubján, Szépesjakobfalva, Jakobsau, Spiš county. The first director of copper smeltery “Nicolaus” in Slovinky near Krompachy Probstner leased and bought after the time primarily exchequer ironworks with Slovak furnace (since 1760) and blast furnace (since 1776) in 1820s. The pig iron was refined in three hearts. The part of the plant was hammer in near Nová Ľubovňa and the rolling mill in Jakubany since 1855. The work became extinct in the 1860s. The blast furnace (inaccessible in consequence of irregular ownerships between state and restitutors at the present time) is in fairish condition. (Moravčíková et al., 2004; Petrík 2010). Moravčíková, Ľ., Petrík, J. and Mihok, Ľ. (2004) Analysis of remnants from blast furnace in Jakubany, 18th - 19th centuries. Acta Metallurgica Slovaca. Vol. 10, pp. 672–676. Petrík, J. (2010) The metallurgy in Spiš county. Carpatica - Karpatika, Vol. 39, Užgorod, UNU, pp. 171–184.		
Spiš	Krompachy	Krompachy (48°55’18’’N; 20°53’23’’E), Korompa, Krompach, Spiš county. The slag is product of older iron works in locality "Maša". The first blast furnace was built there in 1831. Its owner were noble family Gundelfinger, later Pohornádska Company and since 1900 Rimavsko – Muráňská Company. It built new ironworks with coke blast furnaces and Siemens-Martin steel works on the new site near the railway station. The plant was demolished after 1921. The copper smelter was built in its place in the 1930s. Smelted iron ore was mined in Folkmár, Žakarovce/Klippenberg and Helcmanovce. Petrík, J. (2010) The metallurgy in Spiš county. Carpatica - Karpatika, Vol. 39, Užgorod, UNU, pp. 171–184.		
Gemer-Malohont	Nižná Slaná	Nižná Slaná (48°44’20’’N; 20°25’03’’E), Alsósajó, Gemer-Malohont county. The slag is product of blast furnace blown between 1867 and 1907. The family of Counts Andrássy was the owner of the plant. The smelted iron ore was mined in surroundings - Gompel, mine Manó (Nižná Slaná) and mine Ignác (Gočovo). Mihok, Ľ., Petrík, J., Štefanča, P. and Hlobil, J. (2009a) Die Eisenhüttenwerke der Familie Andrássy. Montánna história Vol. 2, Limbach LC s.r.o, pp.208-245. (in Slovak). Petrík, J., Mihok, Ľ. and Moravčíková, Ľ. (2005c) Charcoal blast furnaces situated in localities by the river Slaná. Proceedings of the 35th Meeting of National Technical Museum - History of metallurgy, Prague, Czech Republic, pp. 111-120. (in Slovak)		
Orava	Podbiel	Podbiel (49°17’58’’N; 19°30’02’’E), Podbjel, Orava/Arva county. The slag P 291 is product of blast furnace, a part of the ironworks “Františkova Huta“. The furnace was blown in at 1836 and blown out at 1862. The “Oravský Komposesorát”(árvai uradalom, the consortium of landlords, successors of Count Thurzo) was the owner of the plant. The smelted iron ore was mined in surroundings (Oravské hámre, Ústie nad Priehradou). Mihok, Ľ. and Petrík, J. (2007b) Charcoal furnaces in Podbiel and Píla. Proceedings of the 37th Meeting of National Technical Museum - History of metallurgy, Prague, Czech republic, pp. 39-46. (in Slovak) Mihok, Ľ., Petrík, J. and Moravčíková, Ľ. (2009b) Die Holzkohleöfen im Gebiert der nördlichen und nordöstlichen Slowakei. Montánna história Vol. 2, Limbach LC s.r.o, pp.298-314. (in Slovak).		
Gemer-Malohont	Sirk, local part Červeňany	Sirk, local part Červeňany (48°36’15.09’’N; 20°06’31.54’’E) Szirk, Gemer-malohont county. Blast furnace owned by Hrlicko – tapolcsánska company was in operation between 1871 and 1903. The shaft of the furnace, blown out in 1903 was renovated in 1970s. Sources of iron ore are Železník, Sirk, Rákoš and Nandráž. Petrík, J., Mihok, Ľ. and Fröhlich, L. (2002a): The production of iron in Červeňany and Tri Vody. Proceedings of the 31st Meeting of National Technical Museum - History of metallurgy, Prague, Czech republic, pp. 35-39. (in Slovak)		
Gemer-Malohont	Vlachovo	Vlachovo (48°47’48’’N; 20°23’05’’E), Oláhpatak, Gemer-malohont county. The slag is product of blast furnace blown in at 1843 and blown out at 1907. The shaft of the furace exists on the present. The family of Counts Andrássy was the owner of the plant. The smelted iron ore was mined in Dobšiná, Mlynky, Rejdová (Romolová and Radzim - Kupferberg). (Petrík et al., 2005c; Mihok et al., 2009a). Petrík, J., Mihok, Ľ. and Moravčíková, Ľ. (2005c) Charcoal blast furnaces situated in localities by the river Slaná. Proceedings of the 35th Meeting of National Technical Museum - History of metallurgy, Prague, Czech Republic, pp. 111-120. (in Slovak) Mihok, Ľ., Petrík, J., Štefanča, P. and Hlobil, J. (2009a) Die Eisenhüttenwerke der Familie Andrássy. Montánna história Vol. 2, Limbach LC s.r.o, pp.208-245. (in Slovak).		
Zemplín	Zemplínske Hámre	Zemplínske Hámre (48°56’58.25’’ N; 22°09’18.89’’ E), Josefsthal, until 1960 part of the town Snina, Szinna, Zemplín/Zemplén county. Noble family Rholl von Udvarnok and Count Csaky established ironworks with the blast furnace in 1815. The blast furnace was blown – out in 1873. Only crucible of the original furnace can be seen at the present time. The model of the furnace was built in conformity with documentation in 2015. The ore, smelted in the plant was mined in Zamutov and Hermanovce (Petrík et al., 2002b; Petrík et al., 2002c; Mihok et al., 2009b). Petrík, J. and Mihok, Ľ. (2002b): The archaeometallurgical analysis of the slags from extinct blast furnace plants. Carpatica – Karpatika, Vol. 15, Užgorod, UNU, pp. 250-260. Petrík, J., Mihok, Ľ. and Fröhlich, L. (2002c) Analysis of ironwork slag from the vicinity of the town of Snina. Proceedings of the 13th Meeting Archaeologia technica, Brno, Czech Republic, pp. 23-27. (in Slovak) Mihok, Ľ., Petrík, J. and Moravčíková, Ľ. (2009b) Die Holzkohleöfen im Gebiert der nördlichen und nordöstlichen Slowakei. Montánna história Vol. 2, Limbach LC s.r.o, pp.298-314. (in Slovak).		

=== Ukraine ===
County	Name of location	Current purpose, preserved installations and public attractions	Photo	Official website
Between villages of Yasen’ and Hryn’kiw, Kalush Raion, Ivano-Frankivsk Oblast.		A charcoal blast furnace built in 1810. It was built by wizards who was Boykos. Operated until 1818, using iron ore from neighbourhood. There was casthouse and forge there. Today it is may be oldest historical blast furnace in Ukraine.		
Village Maidan, Drohobych Raion, Lviv oblast		A charcoal blast furnace built in 1814. It was of 9,48 m high.		
Village Mihove, Vyzhnytsia Raion, Chernivtsi Oblast		A charcoal blast furnace built in 1835. It was of 14 m high.		

=== United Kingdom ===
==== England ====
County	Name of location	Current purpose, preserved installations and public attractions	Photo	Official website
Cumbria	Newland Furnace	A charcoal blast furnace built in 1747. Operated by Harrison Ainslie until 1891. Open on heritage open days and by appointment.		
Cumbria	Backbarrow Furnace	Built as a charcoal blast furnace in 1711. Operated by Harrison Ainslie from 1818 until 1914. Closed 1966. On private land but visible from the road		
Broughton-in-Furness, Cumbria	Duddon furnace	A charcoal blast furnace, operating 1736–1867. Managed by Cumbria Tourist Board		
Telford, Shropshire	Blists Hill	The remains of three 19th-century blast furnaces stand with the Blists Hill site of Ironbridge Gorge Museum Trust. Madeley Wood Company built these in 1832. They worked until 1912.		IGMT
Telford, Shropshire	Coalbrookdale	Originally a charcoal furnace, the old blast furnace at Coalbrookdale was leased in 1709 by Abraham Darby I, who used it to make coke pig iron and created the first long-term business to do so. The furnace remained in use until the 19th century and now forms part of the Ironbridge Gorge Museum Trust's Museum of Iron.		IGMT
Telford, Shropshire	Madeley Wood or Bedlam	Two blast furnaces standing beside the road near river Severn, built in 1756 by Madeley Wood Company, and taken over by the Coalbrookdale Company in 1776. Further furnaces were built in the 19th century and operated until 1912. The first two furnaces were blown using water wheels using pumped by steam engines. The site is owned by Ironbridge Gorge Museum Trust		
The Forest of Dean, Gloucestershire	Darkhill Ironworks	Internationally important remains associated with the development of the iron and steel industry. Built in 1818 by David Mushet and later managed by his son Robert Mushet; the site of several key advances in iron and steel production.		
The Forest of Dean, Gloucestershire	Whitecliff Ironworks	Industrial remains of a coke-fired furnace, built at Coleford in 1798 and associated with the development of the iron industry in the Forest of Dean.		
The Forest of Dean, Gloucestershire	Parkend Ironworks	Was a coke-fired furnace built in 1799. Most of the ironworks were demolished between 1890 and 1908, but the engine house survived and is arguably the best preserved example of its kind to be found in the UK.		

==== Scotland ====
County	Name of location	Current purpose, preserved installations and public attractions	Photo	Official website
Argyllshire	Bonawe or Lorn Furnace	A charcoal furnace operating 1753–1876, owned by the Newland Company from Furness and using iron ore from there. Much of the ironworks is preserved, including the lade, although not all the structures are complete. It is now managed and conserved by Historic Environment Scotland		
Argyllshire	Argyll or Craleckan or Goatfield Furnace, Furnace	A charcoal furnace operating 1755–1812, belonging to Kendall & Co., owners of Duddon furnace in Cumbria and other ironworks, using iron ore from Cumbria and local charcoal. The furnace building stands beside the road in the village of Furnace and can be viewed from the road: no public access.		

==== Wales ====
County	Name of location	Current purpose, preserved installations and public attractions	Photo	Official website
Ceredigion	Dyfi Furnace	A charcoal blast furnace close to the west coast of Wales, built in 1755 and long worked by Kendall & Co., it operated until 1805. Now preserved by Cadw.		
Monmouthshire	Tintern Furnace	The excavated site of a charcoal blast furnace on the Angidy Brook is displayed as a tourist attraction. This was part of a series of ironworks (including finery forges and wireworks which existed in the valley, originally established by the Company of Mineral and Battery Works and its farmers. It is maintained by Monmouthshire County Council		
Torfaen	Blaenavon Ironworks	An integrated coke-fired ironworks operating 1789–1903. Now preserved by Cadw and designated a World Heritage Site		
Neath Port Talbot	Neath Abbey Ironworks	Remains of two furnaces built in 1792.		

=== United States ===
City and state	Name of location	Current purpose, preserved installations and public attractions	Photo	Official website
Cartersville, Georgia	Cooper Iron Works	Built by Mark Anthony Cooper in 1847		Cooper's Furnace
Clifton Forge, Alleghany County, Virginia	Clifton Furnace	Site was operational from around 1825. The existing charcoal cold-blast furnace built in 1846 and operated until 1854, renovated in 1874 and abandoned in 1877.		
Saugus, Massachusetts	Saugus ironworks	An early integrated ironworks from the 17th century, excavated and reconstructed in the 1950s. A National Historic Site managed by National Park Service		NPS
Fayette, Michigan	Jackson Iron Company	Charcoal blast furnace operating 1867–1891, now part of Fayette Historic State Park and listed on the National Register of Historic Places		Fayette Historic State Park
Cornwall, Pennsylvania	Cornwall Iron Furnace	Charcoal blast furnace operating 1742–1883, preserved since 1932 by Pennsylvania Historical and Museum Commission		Cornwall Iron Furnace
Elverson, Pennsylvania	Hopewell Furnace	Charcoal-fired cold-blast furnace operating c. 1771–1883. A National Historic Site surrounded by French Creek State Park on three sides. Visitor center, seasonal molding & casting demonstrations, running water-powered blast machinery, charcoal making.		Hopewell Furnace NHS
Robeson Twp., Pennsylvania	Joanna Furnace	Operated 1791–1898, charcoal fired, water powered until the late 1850s, then steam powered Weimar engine. Demos of hand casting, sawmill, line shaft machine shop. Annual Festivals.		www.haycreek.org
Rosiclare, Illinois	Illinois Iron Furnace	Operated 1838-1861 and from 1868 to 1883. The furnace was used to smelt locally mined iron ore; the resulting iron pigs were transported to Elizabethtown, Illinois, where they were shipped elsewhere along the Ohio River. The surrounding area is a picnic site and visitor information center narrating the history of the furnace and Illinois' iron industry.		Shawnee National Forest web site

== Industrial mass production ==
These installations all date from the 20th century. They are supported by outer frames made of metal, were supplied with pre-heated blast air from external Cowper stoves, were typically part of large industrial compounds where, at one point, multiple blast furnaces were typically standing and operating side by side for efficiency reasons, raw materials were delivered by external elevating mechanisms, and the entire site was accessible by freight trains which delivered the raw materials and carried off the freshly smelted pig iron in ladles.

In many cases, the preserved sites have been deliberately stripped down to minimize maintenance costs; namely, some blast furnaces and related installations have been demolished. The goal was to only retain one or two blast furnaces including the relevant related installations (such as Cowper stoves, cast house, winch house etc.), which are considered sufficient to explain the blast furnace process and all related functions to visitors.

The first such decommissioned blast furnace that wasn't demolished and has been preserved to this very day stands in Starachowice, Poland, and has ceased operation as early as 1968.

=== Czech Republic ===
City	Name of location	Current purpose, preserved installations and public attractions	Photo	Official website
Ostrava-Vítkovice, Moravian-Silesian Region	Vítkovice Area (formerly Vítkovice Iron and Steel Works, or Vítkovické železárny, decommissioned in 1998)	The site has been declared an industrial heritage site and is currently in the process of being rebuilt for further use, but is already open to visitors upon reservation. Three blast furnaces have been preserved, including cowper stoves and cast houses. A light installation illuminates the entire plant at nighttime. An application to declare the entire site a UNESCO World Heritage Site is currently pending.		

=== Belgium ===
City	Name of location	Current purpose, preserved installations and public attractions	Photo	Official website
Seraing, Liège Province	Haut Fourneau d'Ougrée (HFB, operated 1962-2011 by Cockerill)	The site is not yet open to the public, but a project is supported by the municipal authorities.		

=== France ===
City	Name of location	Current purpose, preserved installations and public attractions	Photo	Official website
Uckange, Moselle, Lorraine	Parc du Haut-Fourneau (last operated by Lorfonte, decommissioned in 1991, opened to the public in 2007)	The site is open to the public as part of a park. One blast furnace (U4) has been preserved, including cowper stoves. A colorful light installation illuminates the entire plant at nighttime.		

=== Germany ===
City and region	Name of location	Current purpose, preserved installations and public attractions	Photo	Official website
Dortmund, Ruhr, North Rhine-Westphalia	Phoenix-West (formerly Hoerder Verein, last operated by Friedrich Krupp AG Hoesch-Krupp, decommissioned in 1998)	The area is currently in the process of being turned into a modern technology plant. Some of the remaining structures of the ironworks are intended to be incorporated into the new facilities, while others are supposed to be turned into a museum site. One blast furnace has been preserved, a second one has been mostly dismantled, only the outer frame, the Cowper stoves and the lower portion of the furnace itself remain. The site is currently only accessible to the public as part of guided tours along a walkway called the "Skywalk Dortmund", although the top platform of blast furnace 6 is not accessible to the public yet. However, unlike other sites in Germany, the inside of the remains of blast furnace 6 is accessible to the public. The outer frame of blast furnace 6 is considered for a re-purposed use, but there are no concrete plans yet. A colorful light installation illuminates the plant at special occasions in the summer.		
Duisburg, Ruhr, North Rhine-Westphalia	Landschaftspark Duisburg-Nord (formerly Thyssen-Hüttenwerk Meiderich, decommissioned in 1985, opened to the public in 1994)	The ironworks site has been integrated into a public park that tries to re-purpose existing structures with minimal modifications. Three complete blast furnaces have been preserved, including outer frames, furnaces, Cowper stoves, winch houses, and casthouses. The cowper stoves of blast furnace 5 are rust-free due to a zinc layer added during construction. The casthouse of blast furnace 1 has been turned into a multi-purpose hall including a newly added tribune which is used as a movie theater in the summer. The casthouse of blast furnace 2 has been turned into a climbing garden (primarily for children) which is only accessible upon reservation. Blast furnace 5, including winch house and cast house, has been turned into an observation platform that is open to the public, featuring information plates for the function of the blast furnace's individual components. A colorful light installation designed by Jonathan Park illuminates the entire plant at nighttime during the weekends, with a stripped-down version used on regular weekdays.		
Hattingen, Ruhr, North Rhine-Westphalia	Henrichshütte (last operated by Thyssen Stahl AG, decommissioned in 1987, opened to the public in 2000)	The ironworks site has been turned into a museum (part of the LWL-Industriemuseum). One complete blast furnace has been preserved, including the outer frame, furnace, Cowper stoves, winch house, and casthouse. A protective paint coating minimizes the rusting effects on the blast furnace's outer frame. Two of the Cowper stoves are also rust-free due to a zinc layer added during construction. Blast furnace 3, including the cast house, is one of the main components of the museum and features numerous information plates, exhibition pieces and documentary films on monitors. The blast furnace also serves as an observation platform. An elevator has been installed. A colorful light installation illuminates the blast furnace at night.		
Neunkirchen, Saarland	Altes Hüttenareal Neunkirchen (formerly Neunkircher Eisenwerk, last operated by ARBED, decommissioned in 1982, opened to the public in 1993)	The remains of the ironworks site have been integrated into a public park. New structures, such as pubs, a movie theater and a multi-purpose event hall, have been built around the remaining installations. A shopping mall is located adjacent to the park. Two blast furnaces have been preserved, including outer frames, furnaces and Cowper stoves. A protective paint coating minimizes the rusting effects on the blast furnaces. Blast furnace 6 is accessible to the public as part of guided tours. A colorful light installation illuminates the entire area at nighttime.		
Sulzbach-Rosenberg, Bavaria	Maxhütte (last operated by NMH Stahlwerke GmbH, decommissioned in 2002)	Formerly an integrated steel mill, a large number of installations are currently in the process of demolition. Only a small core area, including the blast furnace itself, is intended for preservation. The site is currently not open to the public. One blast furnace remains, including cowper stoves.		
Völklingen, Saarland	Völklingen Ironworks (Völklinger Hütte, last used by ARBED Saarstahl GmbH, decommissioned in 1986, put under monument conservation in 1992)	The ironworks site has been turned into a museum (declared UNESCO World Heritage Site in 1994). Six blast furnaces have been preserved, including outer frames, furnaces, Cowper stoves, and casthouses. As part of the museum site, the combined blast furnaces also serve as an observation platform, with the highest point being on top of a group of Cowper stoves. A colorful light installation designed by Hans Peter Kuhn illuminates the entire plant at nighttime.		

=== Japan ===
City and prefecture	Name of location	Current purpose, preserved installations and public attractions	Photo	Official website
Yahatahigashi-ku, Kitakyūshū, Fukuoka Prefecture, Kyūshū Island	Higashida Blast Furnace Memorial Square (formerly Yahata Steel Works, decommissioned in 1972, opened to the public in 1997)	The site is now a museum. The inside of the blast furnace is accessible to the public. One blast furnace has been preserved, including outer frame, furnace, cowper stoves and casthouse. A protective paint coating minimizes the rusting effects on the blast furnace. A light installation illuminates the site at nighttime.		

=== Luxembourg ===
City	Name of location	Current purpose, preserved installations and public attractions	Photo	Official website
Esch-sur-Alzette	Esch Belval (last operated by ARBED, decommissioned in 1997)	The site is currently in the process of being converted into a multi-purpose area. Two blast furnaces have been preserved.		

=== Mexico ===
City and country	Name of location	Current purpose, preserved installations and public attractions	Photo	Official website
Monterrey	Fundidora Park (Parque Fundidora, previously operated by Monterrey Steel Foundry Company, decommissioned in 1986, opened to the public in 1988)	The steel mill has been integrated into a public park, with a blast furnace serving as a museum. Two blast furnaces have been preserved, including cowper stoves. Blast furnace 3 is a museum and serves as an observation platform. An elevator has been installed. The entire plant is illuminated at night. An application to declare blast furnaces 1 and 3 UNESCO World Heritage Sites is currently pending.		

=== Poland ===
City and province	Name of location	Current purpose, preserved installations and public attractions	Photo	Official website
Starachowice, Świętokrzyskie Voivodeship	Museum of Nature and Technology Ekomuseum Jana Pazdura (Muzeum Przyrody i Techniki Ekomuzeum im. Jana Pazdura, last operated by Star, decommissioned in 1968, opened to the public in 2000)	One blast furnace has been preserved, including cowper stoves.		

=== Romania ===
City	Name of location	Current purpose, preserved installations and public attractions	Photo	Official website
Reșița, Caraș-Severin County,	Inside TMK Reșița, near the continuous casting plant. The number 2 blast furnace with a 700-cubic-meter capacity, built between 1959 and 1962, and it was permanently shut down in 1991.	There were two same type, Soviet-model blast furnaces and shared the same casthouse. The number 1 blast furnace was demolished between 2001 and 2002. The second blast furnace with its three Cowper type preheating stoves, smokestack, raw materials silos and plumbing are declared as historical monument since 2003. The furnace can't be visited because it is located inside the yard of an active steel mill, but can be seen very well from outside.		

=== Russian Federation ===
City and province	Name of location	Current purpose, preserved installations and public attractions	Photo	Official website
Nizhny Tagil, Sverdlovsk Oblast	Nizhny Tagil Museum-Reserve of Mining and Metallurgy of the Middle Urals (previously Nizhny Tagil Metallurgical Combine/Kuibyshev Metallurgical Plant, decommissioned in 1987, integrated into the museum in 1992)	The steel mill has been turned into a museum. Two blast furnaces have been preserved, including cowper stoves.		
Polevskoy, Sverdlovsk Oblast	Museum Complex "Seversky Blast Furnace" owned by Seversky Tube Works (TMK Group).	The decommissioned blast furnace built in 1860, rebuild in 1896 and has been turned into a museum in 1980-s.		

=== Spain ===
Place and province	Name of location	Current purpose, preserved installations and public attractions	Photo	Official website
Puerto de Sagunto, Sagunto, Camp de Morvedre, Valencia	Altos Hornos del Mediterráneo (decommissioned in 1984)	One blast furnace has been preserved, including the outer frame. The blast furnace is currently intended to be turned into a museum site following the examples of Völklingen Ironworks and Fundidora Park.		
Sestao, Biscay, Basque Country	Altos Hornos de Vizcaya (decommissioned in 1996)	One blast furnace has been preserved, including the outer frame, winch house and cowper stoves.		

=== United States ===
City and country	Name of location	Current purpose, preserved installations and public attractions	Photo	Official website
Bethlehem, Pennsylvania	Bethlehem Steel (decommissioned in 1995)	The site is now the location of the Wind Creek Bethlehem casino hotel. Five blast furnaces were left standing, including cowper stoves. The plant was intended to be incorporated into The National Museum of Industrial History, however the bankruptcy of Bethlehem Steel and the sale of assets to ISG put that on hold. The blast furnaces are now the property of the Sands Casino Resort Bethlehem, as are other remaining structures intended for the NMIH.		
Rankin, Pennsylvania	Carrie Furnace (last operated by U.S. Steel Homestead Steel Works, decommissioned in 1978)	Two blast furnaces have been preserved, including cowper stoves. The site is open to the public as part of guided tours and is currently planned to be incorporated into a Homestead Works National Park.		
Birmingham, Alabama	Sloss Furnaces (decommissioned in 1971)	Pig iron-producing blast furnace from 1882 to 1971. Two blast furnaces have been preserved, including cowper stoves. Designated a National Historic Landmark in 1981, the site currently serves as an interpretive museum of industry and hosts a nationally recognized metal arts program. It also serves as a concert and festival venue.		
