= Forest of Dean Coalfield =

Coal mining region in Gloucestershire, England

Coordinates: 51.7891°N 2.5432°W

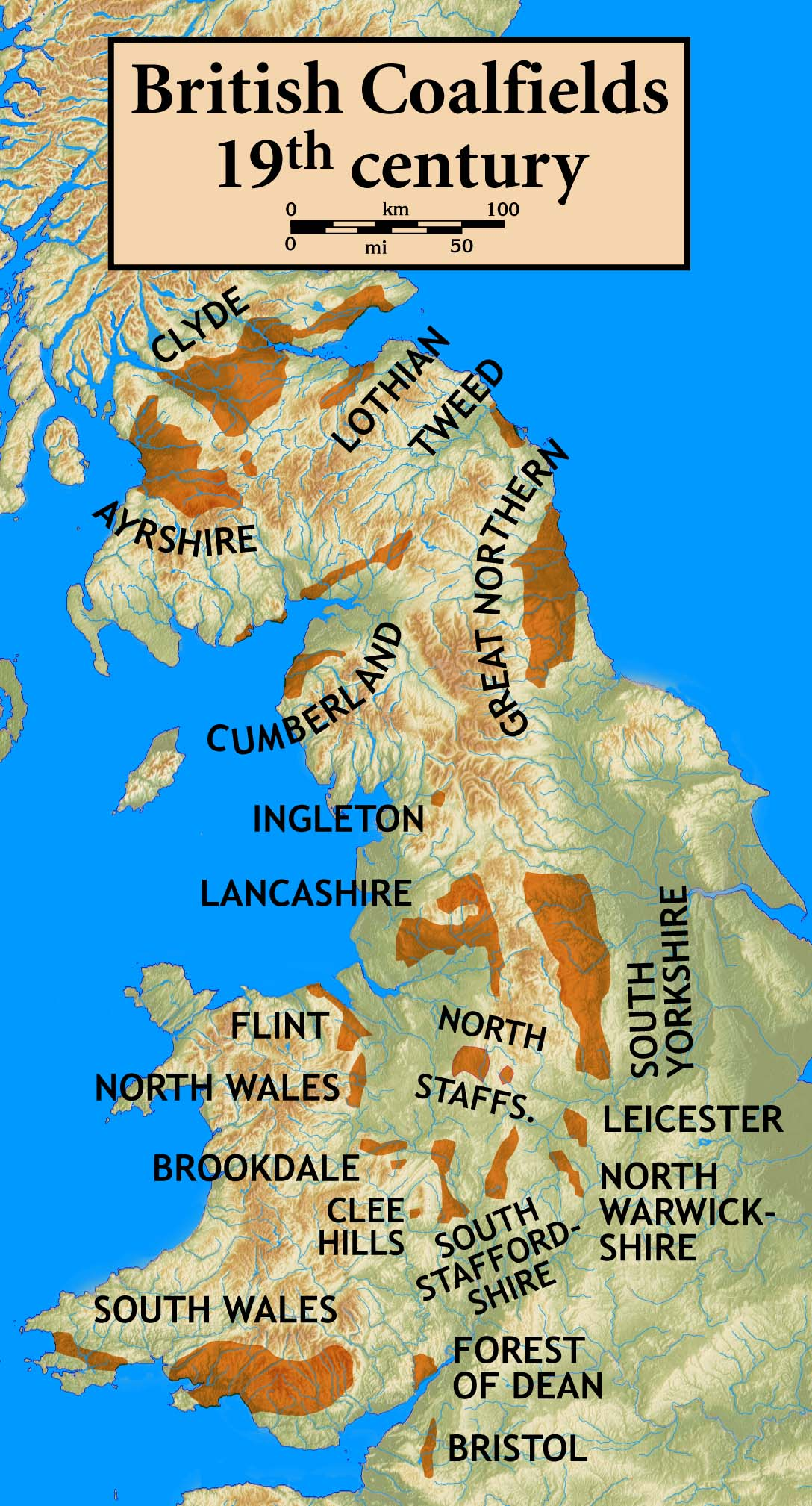

The Forest of Dean Coalfield, underlying the Forest of Dean, in west Gloucestershire, is one of the smaller coalfields in the British Isles, although intensive mining during the 19th and 20th centuries has had enormous influence on the landscape, history, culture, and economy of the area.

For hundreds of years, mining in the Forest of Dean Coalfield has been regulated through a system of freemining, in which individuals who qualify are granted leases to mine specified areas, known as gales. The Coal Industry Nationalisation Act 1946 exempted the Forest of Dean because of its unique form of ownership and history, allowing the unique privilege to continue intact.

The last of the big gales closed in 1965 and today only a few small collieries are still operating.

== Geology and hydrology ==
The Forest of Dean Coalfield formed during Upper Carboniferous times, when the area was a nearshore-intertidal environment of semi-marine estuaries and swamps. The area today is a raised basin plateau of Paleozoic rocks folded in the Variscan Orogeny. It occurs in a raised asymmetrical syncline with a steeper eastern limb that surfaces in the area of Staple Edge and the Soudley Valley producing the steeply dipping strata. An unusual feature of the Forest of Dean Coalfield is that its edges are almost entirely exposed at the surface.

Geological cross section (west to east), showing the major structural features of the Forest of Dean

Mining in the coalfield has always been hampered by the excessive amount of water encountered underground - trapped by the basin-shaped strata. Water drains into the basin by general percolation and, more directly, via surface watercourses. For much of their length, streams in the area run over impervious clay deposits, but, where valleys cut through the rim of the basin, carboniferous limestone and sandstone are exposed, allowing water to penetrate underground via swallow holes, cracks, and fissures. Water also enters the basin through geological faults.

In an attempt to reduce the pumping requirement, many mine owners 'waterproofed' the beds of watercourses with conduits or channels, wherever water loss was thought likely to occur. These artificial drainage features can be seen, at some point or other, on almost every watercourse within the mining area.

== Freemining ==
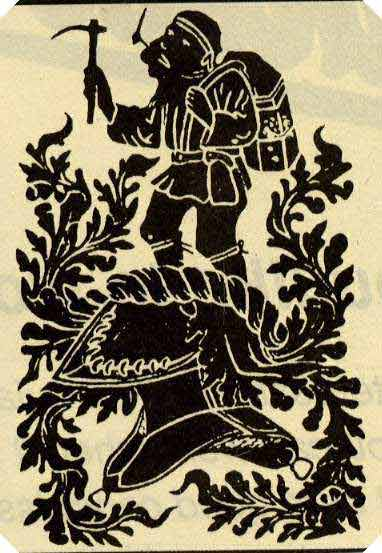
The 'Freeminer Brass': a symbol of the freeminers' authority above the Crown

And be it enacted, that all Male Persons born or hereafter to be born and abiding within the said Hundred of Saint Briavels, of the Age of Twenty-one Years and upwards, who shall have worked a Year and a Day in a Coal or Iron Mine within the said Hundred of Saint Briavels, shall be deemed and taken to be Free Miners for the Purposes of this Act.

— The Dean Forest (Mines) Act 1838.

For hundreds of years, mining in the Forest of Dean Coalfield has been regulated through a system of freemining; where individuals, if they qualify, can lease a specified area in which to mine. Freeminers were instrumental in recapturing Berwick upon Tweed several times (1296, 1305, and 1315) and it is thought that freemining rights were granted by Edward I as a reward for their endeavours. The Free Miner's Mine Law Court sat at the Speech House from 1682 and the earliest known existing copy of Dean Miners Laws and Privilege's, known locally as the Book of Dennis, dates from 1610, but the copy contains references to much earlier origins.

Towards the end of the 18th century, as the Industrial Revolution took hold, increasing demand for coal and iron led to conflicting mining interests and the court became bogged down with disputes. Deep coal and iron reserves could not be mined without substantial investment and the Crown became determined to introduce the free market into the Forest. The Mine Law Court was outlawed in 1777 and all its documents were confiscated by Crown Officials.

A Royal Commission was appointed in 1831 to inquire into the nature of the mineral interests and freemining customs in the Forest of Dean, leading to the passing of the Dean Forest Mines Act 1838, which forms the basis of freemining law. It confirmed the freeminers' exclusive right to the minerals of the Forest of Dean, but also allowed freeminers to sell their gales to a non-freeminers; further opening up the Forest to outside industrialists.

As of 2010 the gender requirement was recognised as archaic, and women are now allowed to become freeminers.

== Exploitation of the coalfield ==
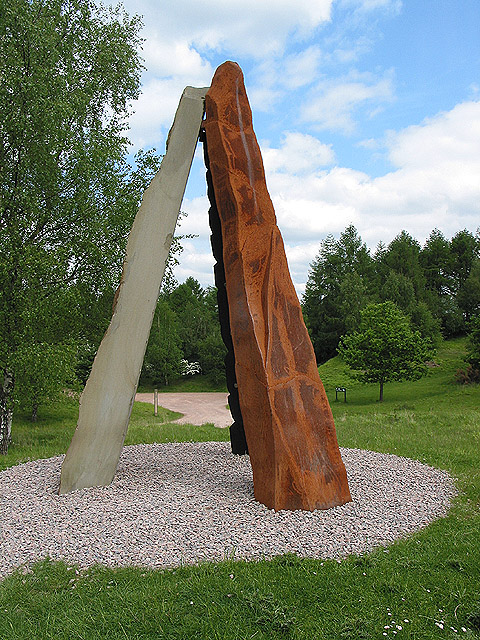
The Roll of Honour sculpture at New Fancy, commemorating miners who were killed or injured in the mines and quarries of the Forest of Dean

Coal mining, on a small scale, began before Roman times. The small mines were widespread but as iron mining was of greater importance, mining coal was possibly a by-product. Edward Terringham, a Gentleman of the Bedchamber in the court of Charles I was granted a monopoly to mine coal in the Forest, infringing the rights of freeminers and leading to widespread and sometimes violent confrontation. To improve production and enable year-round working, Terringham built a drainage sough and brought in labour from Staffordshire. He abandoned the lease to Sir John Winter for an annuity in 1640. Disafforestation took place but Winter was deprived of his rights during the Protectorate and after the Restoration gave up the lease. At this time the coal, which amounted to about 25,000 tons in 1680, was shipped out of the area via the River Wye.

The coalfield was not exploited to any great degree until the Industrial Revolution, when coke-fired ironworks were built in the Forest. Initially, it proved impossible to produce coke from local coal that was ideal for smelting which was a major factor in the failure of three early furnaces within a decade of them opening. Around 1820 Moses Teague, whilst borrowing the cupola furnace at Darkhill Ironworks, discovered a way to make good iron from local coke, greatly advancing the iron and coal industries of the Forest of Dean.

By the mid-19th century, there were more than 300 gales or coal workings and it was said there were more men working below ground than there were working above.

The Coal Industry Nationalisation Act, of 1946 exempted the Forest of Dean, due to its unique form of ownership and history, allowing freemining privileges to continue intact. Some large colliery gales were subsequently compulsorily purchased by the National Coal Board (NCB), but remained under the freemining system and a royalty was paid to the freeminers by the NCB as a share of the minerals extracted.

In 1945 half the male population of the Forest were employed in coal mining. The last of the NCB gales closed in 1965, but freemining continues to be an important aspect of Forest of Dean culture and there are probably still around 150 freeminers, although only a small number of collieries are still operating.

== Collieries ==
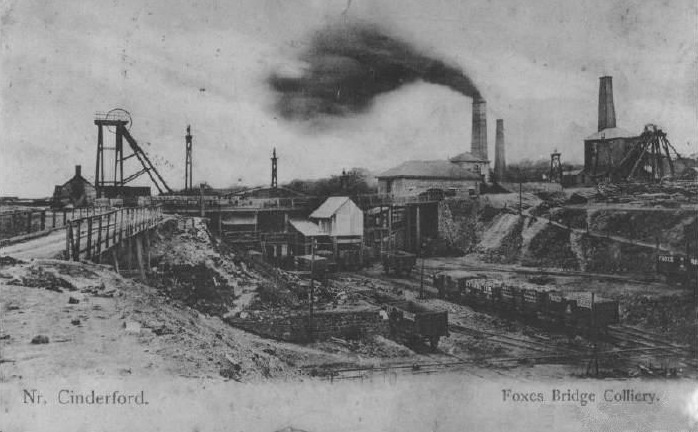
Foxes Bridge Colliery, ca. 1900

The collieries or gales, most of which were small, were given "imaginative" somewhat unusual names, such as Strip and At It, Gentleman Colliers or Rain Proof. They took coal from seams or delfs named Rocky, Lowery, and Starkey. Child labour was used extensively underground to drag loads of coal up to 1842 when it was made illegal.

In 1904 some gales were amalgamated into seven groups in order to mine on a larger scale from deeper seams and the output reached one million tons annually. Output declined after World War II and the last big pit closed in 1965 and the area was subject to opencast working. Coal is still mined on a very small scale.

- Arthur and Edward near Lydbrook was also known as Waterloo. (NCB) The pit had a Cornish pumping engine until the early 1860s. In 1949 the pit was flooded by an inrush of water from the old East Slade Pit but one miner knew a way out through old workings and led his four colleagues to safety at Pludds Colliery.
- Bilson produced 4,482 tons of coal in 1880.
- Cannop (NCB)
- Crump Meadow produced 75,173 tons of coal in 1880. It had a Cornish engine house for pumping water and another for winding. It was sunk in 1824 and had a 105-year life span.
- Eastern United (NCB)
- East Slade close to Ruardean Woodside closed in 1910.
- Flour Mill
- Foxes Bridge produced 126,978 tons of coal in 1880. It was operated by Henry Crawshay and Company and closed in 1930.

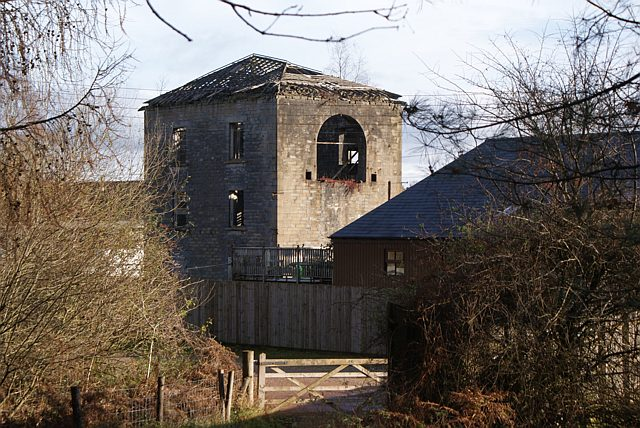
Lightmoor Colliery's engine house

- Lightmoor produced 60 tons of coal in 1880. The colliery belonged to Henry Crawshaw and Company and had lasted for a century when it closed in 1940. Its shaft which reached the Brazilly seam at 936 feet intersected 18 coal seams, but not all were workable.
- New Fancy produced 8,382 tons of coal in 1880. It worked the Coleford High Delf seam and closed in 1944.
- Norchard (NCB)
- Northern United (NCB) owned by Henry Crawshay and Company opened in 1933 and closed in 1965. It accessed the Coleford High Delf seam at a depth of 700 feet.
- Parkend produced 8,093 tons of coal in 1880.
- Princess Royal (NCB) produced 2,665 tons of coal in 1880.
- Speculation produced 18,694 tons of coal in 1880.
- Speech House
- Trafalgar produced 88,794 tons of coal in 1880.

== See also ==
- List of coalfields (Great Britain)
- Forest of Dean Miners' Association
- Cinderford Ironworks
- Whitecliff Ironworks
- Parkend Ironworks
