= Eric F. W. Powell =

British naturopath

- Born: Eric Frederick William Powell; 28 August 1899; Cinderford
- Died: 8 December 1989 (aged 90)
- Occupation: Naturopath

Eric Frederick William Powell (28 August 1899 – 8 December 1989) was a British herbalist, homeopath and naturopath.

Powell was born in Cinderford in 1899. He was educated at Cinderford Grammar School. He married Irene Sharp and resided in Harpenden. Powell wrote many books, also under the pseudonym Peter Rusholm. He was the first to define phytotherapy in 1934.

Powell was a vegetarian in his personal life. He lectured throughout the United Kingdom on correct breathing techniques, exercise, and vegetarianism. Powell argued that humans were designed by nature to be vegetarians and that meat-eating was "corpse eating".

He was on the editorial board of Homoeopathic World. He died in 1989.

== Selected publications ==
- Cell Nutrition (1934)
- Health Secrets of all Ages (1935)
- A Simple Way to Successful Living (1951)
- Kelp: The Health Giver (1957)
- Health from the Kitchen (1959)
- Building a Healthy Heart (1961)
- The Natural Home Physician (1962)
- Health from the Earth (1970)
- About Dandelions (1972)
- A Home Course in Nutrition (1978)
