= Cinderford =

Town in Gloucestershire, England

Coordinates: 51.8225°N 2.4989°W

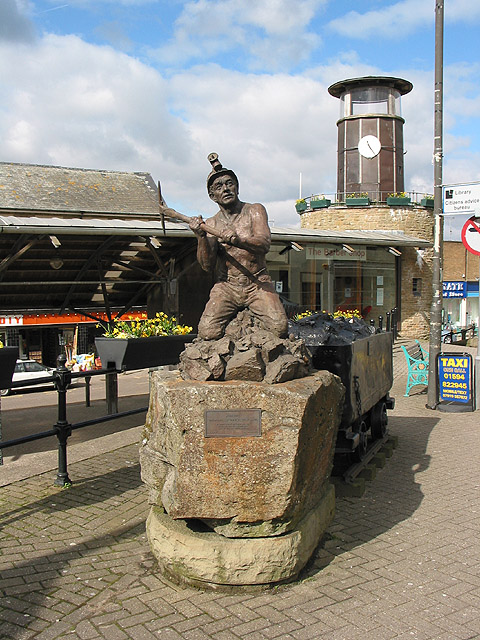
- Miners' Tribute, by Antony Dufort

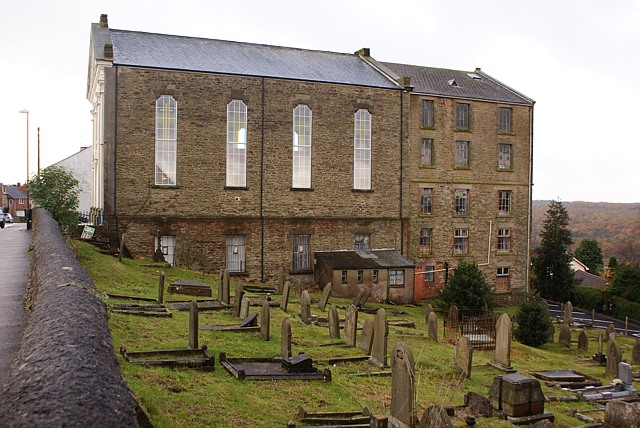
- Cinderford Baptist Chapel

- Location within Gloucestershire
- Population: 8,777 (2021 Census)
- OS grid reference: SO6513
- Civil parish: Cinderford
- District: Forest of Dean
- Shire county: Gloucestershire
- Region: South West
- Country: England
- Sovereign state: United Kingdom
- Post town: Cinderford
- Postcode district: GL14
- Dialling code: 01594
- Police: Gloucestershire
- Fire: Gloucestershire
- Ambulance: South Western
- UK Parliament: Forest of Dean

Cinderford is a town and civil parish on the eastern fringe of the Forest of Dean in Gloucestershire, England. The population was 8,777 at the 2021 Census.

The town came into existence in the 19th century, following the rapid expansion of the Forest of Dean Coalfield and the construction of Cinderford Ironworks. Its origins can be seen in the style and layout of the town, with long rows of identical terraced housing similar to those found in the mining villages of the South Wales Valleys. The decline of the coal industry in the 1950s and 1960s significantly affected the town, as most of the male population was employed in mining.

== History ==
The name Cinderford, used for a crossing-point, is recorded as early as 1258. The name reflects the site of early ironmaking which created deposits of cinders (clinker), sometimes in large mounds.

Following the construction of Cinderford Ironworks in the late 1790s, and the opening of large mines nearby, the town was laid out on a fairly conventional urban plan. In 1841 there were two inns and at least ten beerhouses in and around Cinderford. A new church was consecrated at Cinderford in 1844 and dedicated to St. John the Evangelist. By 1843 Cinderford also had a Baptist church which became by far the largest Baptist meeting in the Forest of Dean. Methodists and Primitive Methodists also had chapels in the area, and there was even an iron building which became known as the Ark, which was registered in 1886 by a group called the Blue Ribbon Gospel Army.

A coke-fired furnace was established in around 1797. It was situated 800 metres north of Cinderford bridge and used coke brought from Broadmoor, to the north, by a short canal. The furnace struggled to compete with iron furnaces elsewhere, and fell idle ten years later. It was revived in 1829 when new works on the old site were established by the Forest of Dean Iron Company, and in 1841 there were three furnaces producing 12,000 tons of iron a year and employing 100 men and boys. Only one furnace at the works was in blast in 1890 and the works closed in 1894.

By the 1840s Cinderford had a number of foundries and small engineering firms supplying the mining industry with machine parts, and it remained a centre for metal industries in the early 20th century.

For many years coal mining was the principal industry in the area. Lightmoor coal mine was being deepened in the late 1830s. Trafalgar colliery which was in production in 1860, was the only large mine in the coalfield run by freeminers in the later 19th century. Trafalgar closed in 1925. A deep mine, called Northern United, was begun north-west of Cinderford in 1933, but Lightmoor, with a workforce of 600 in 1934, was the main colliery in the Cinderford area until it closed in 1940. There were still many smaller collieries in the Forest of Dean, employing 84.5 per cent of the adult male population in the Cinderford area, until the industry declined in the 1960s.

Iron ore mines were also worked near the town in the 19th century until the closure of the Cinderford ironworks led to the abandonment of Buckshaft and other ore mines near the town in 1899.

On 26 April 1889, four Frenchmen and their two tame bears were making their way to Ruardean, having performed in Cinderford. They were attacked by a mob, enraged by claims that the bears had killed a child and injured a woman. The bears were killed and the Frenchmen badly beaten. It soon became clear that the bears had not attacked anyone. Police proceedings followed, and 13 colliers and labourers appeared before magistrates at Littledean a week later, charged with ill-treating and killing the bears, and assaulting the Frenchmen. All but two were found guilty on one or more charges, with another convicted a week later. A total of £85 (equivalent to £9,444 in 2025) was paid in fines. A subscription was also launched which generously compensated the Frenchmen. The question "Who killed the bears?" was used for many years as an insult, directed particularly towards the people of Ruardean, despite the fact that all those convicted were from Cinderford.

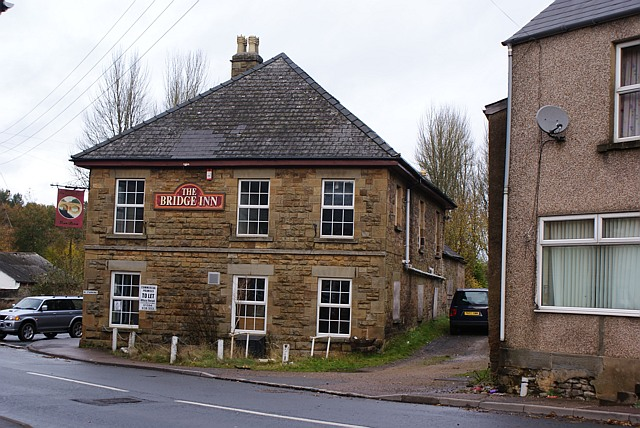
The Bridge Inn, Cinderford, now closed and demolished.

Cinderford Town Trail has been created and researched by school pupils to celebrate the history of the town.

== Governance ==
There are two electoral wards in Cinderford.

== Education ==
=== Primary ===
Cinderford has three primary schools; Steam Mills Primary School, on Steam Mills Road, St. White's Primary School, on St. Whites Road, and Forest View Primary School based on Latimer Road. Forest View Primary School is an amalgamation of the Latimer Junior School and the Bilson Infants' School (formerly on Station Street).

=== Secondary ===
Cinderford has a single, relatively small secondary school on Causeway Road, currently called The Forest High School but previously known as Heywood Community School. The school existed as Double View Secondary Modern School on a previous campus, on Woodville Road, but moved to the Causeway Road campus, in the early-mid-1970s. Until 1979 it was split between the two sites; in the mid-1980s it changed its name from Double View to Heywood Community School, and in 2012 it became an academy called Forest E-ACT Academy. The name changed again to Forest Academy in 2014 and to the current name in 2015.

=== Tertiary ===
Opened in 2018, Gloucestershire College is situated beside the Forest Vale Industrial Estate.

== Transport ==
Cinderford's High Street and Belle Vue Road lie on the A4151, which links with the A48 (Gloucester-Chepstow road) to the east.

In former times, Cinderford had a railway station that was opened by the Severn and Wye Railway and later run by the Great Western Railway and Midland Railway as Cinderford Joint railway station, but this was axed in 1958.

Cinderford is served by a regular bus service to Gloucester and Coleford; the bus station was dismantled in the late 1980s and no longer exists.

The closest airports are in Staverton (between Gloucester and Cheltenham), as well as Bristol Airport and Cardiff Airport.

== Religion ==
The Church of England Benefice of Cinderford with Littledean consists of three parish churches. The parish church of St Stephen's covers the central town and northern parts of Cinderford. The parish church of St John the Evangelist covers the south of Cinderford, Ruspidge and Soudley. The parish church of St Ethelbert's Littledean is further down the hill and serves the community there.

== Media ==
Dean Radio is a community station that broadcasts from the town.

The town is served by the local newspaper, The Forester.

== Sports clubs ==
- Cinderford Town A.F.C. - Local Non-League football team
- Cinderford R.F.C. - Local Rugby Team

== Notable people ==
- Dame Muriel Betty Powell (1914–1978), Chief Nursing Officer (CNO) for the Scottish Home and Health Department, was born in Cinderford.
- Jimmy Young (1921–2016), a BBC Radio 1 and BBC Radio 2 DJ, was born in Cinderford.
- John McAfee (1945 – 2021), computer programmer, businessman, and two-time U.S. presidential candidate, was born in Cinderford.
- Leonard Clark (1905 - 1981) Poet, writer, editor and educator.
- Alternative rock band EMF was formed in Cinderford in 1989.
