= Darkhill Ironworks =

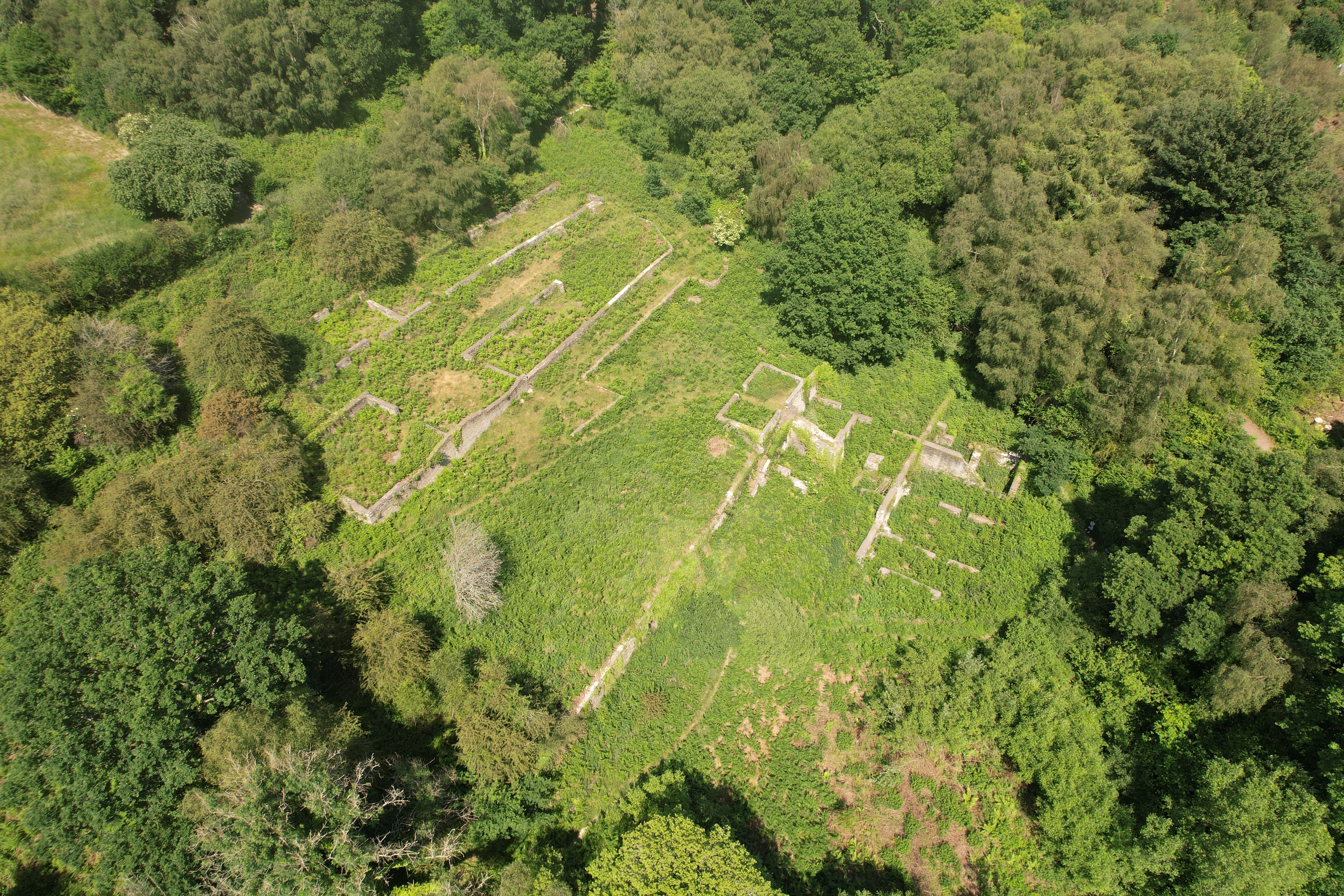
- Remains in 2023

- Location in Gloucestershire
- 51.776265°N 2.595434°W
- Location: Gloucestershire, England, UK
- OS grid reference: SO587085

Darkhill Ironworks, and the neighbouring Titanic Steelworks, are internationally important industrial remains associated with the development of the iron and steel industries in the 19th century. Both are scheduled monuments. They are located on the edge of a small hamlet called Gorsty Knoll, just to the west of Parkend, in the Forest of Dean, Gloucestershire, England. Historically, Darkhill was sometimes written Dark Hill.

== History ==
The noted Scottish metallurgist David Mushet moved to the Forest of Dean in February 1810 to take up full-time management of Whitecliff Ironworks in Coleford – although he quickly disengaged himself from the business for reasons that are not known.

In 1818/19 he built a coke-fired 'experimental furnace' at Darkhill, marking the start of industrial activity on the site. Although he did produce significant quantities of iron for sale, the larger part of the works was given over to research and experimental production.

In 1845 David retired to Monmouth and conveyed Darkhill to his three sons, with the youngest, Robert Mushet, becoming the manager. The sons constantly quarrelled and just six weeks after their father’s death they attempted to sell Darkhill, and other works bequeathed to them, at auction in July 1847. Either there were no takers, or as seems more likely, it was withdrawn from sale. In September 1847 the brothers agreed to dissolve their partnership and the main furnace was probably never again in blast.

Robert, now free of family ties, went into partnership with a Birmingham merchant named Thomas Deykin Clare. Trading as R Mushet & Co., they opened a 'small experimental steelworks' on the upper terrace of Darkhill in 1848, called the Forest Steel Works.

Robert produced some steel here, and some finished tools, but more importantly he made great progress in his experiments with steel alloys and it became clear that a new operation would be required to facilitate production. The alloy for which Robert held most aspiration was one using titanium; so he named the new company The Titanic Steelworks and Iron Works Co. Ltd., known as The Titanic Steelworks. It opened in October 1862, less than 250 yards from the old works of Darkhill. Three hundred men were employed there, but demand for the new alloys, and profits, did not meet expectations. Robert returned to his experiments and in 1868 he invented 'R Mushet's Special Steel' (R.M.S.).

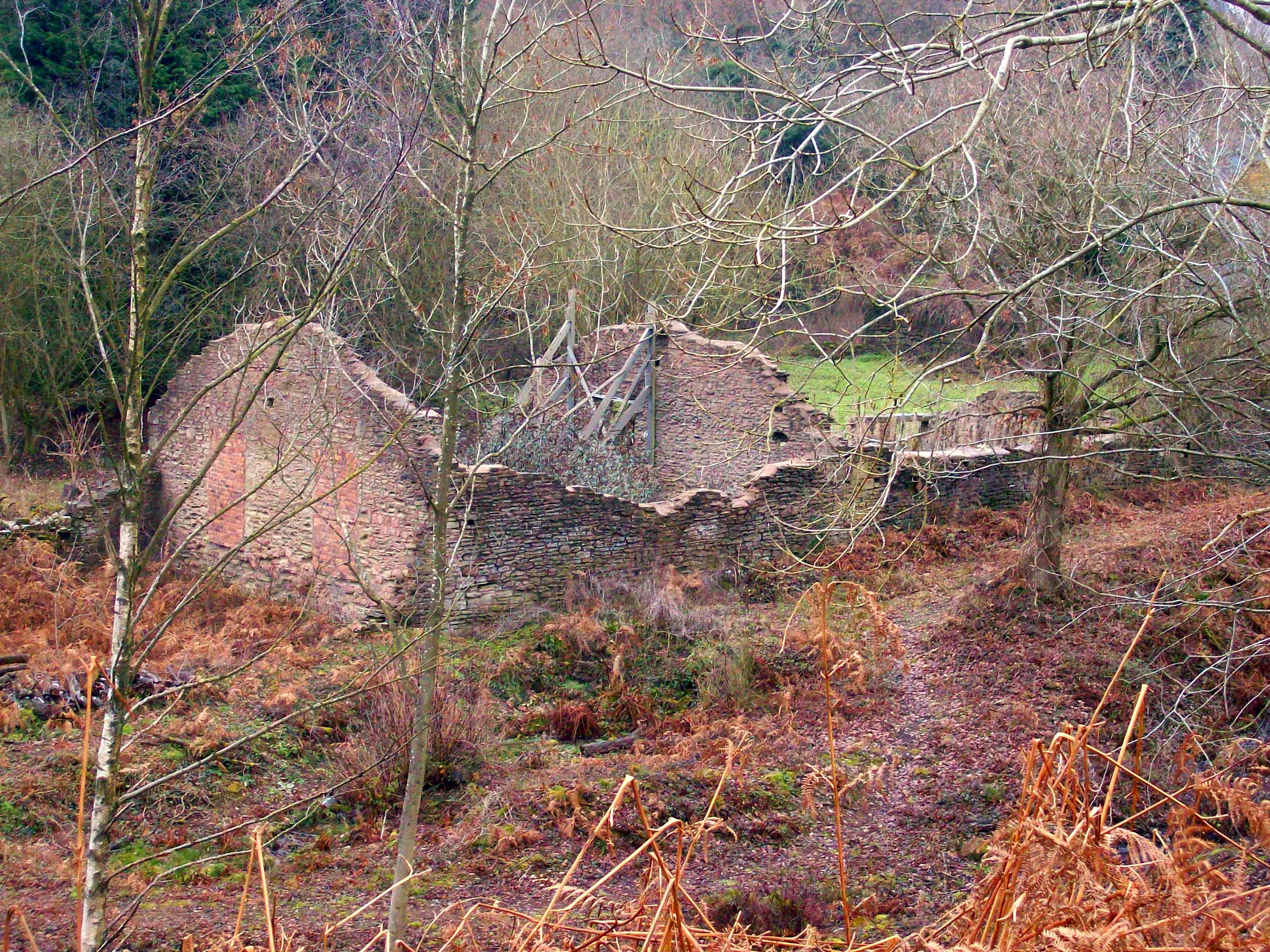
Very little of the Titanic Steelworks now survive.

In 1870 Mushet met Samuel Osborn, a Sheffield steelmaker, who persuaded him that the future of steel production lay the rapidly expanding industrial centre of Sheffield. In 1871 the Titanic works were closed down and Mushet entered into a new agreement with Samuel Osborn. The agreement was straightforward, Osborn was given the sole right to manufacture R.M.S. and Mushet was to receive a royalty on every ton sold. To ensure secrecy some of the specialised processes were still carried out in the Forest of Dean, overseen by Mushet himself, while Mushet's two sons Henry and Edward moved to Sheffield to oversee its manufacture. Samuel Osborn & Company went on to become the second largest steel firm in Sheffield.

The Titanic company was wound up in 1874. By the 1960s the buildings had lost their roofs and many were bulldozed – the material being used as hardcore in the construction of the Severn Bridge.

Darkhill Ironworks was finally sold by the brothers in 1864, to Samuel Morgan. By 1874 it was owned by the Severn & Wye Railway & Canal Co, who used part of the site to run their new railway across. In 1981 Darkhill was sold back to the Crown.

== Significance and legacy ==
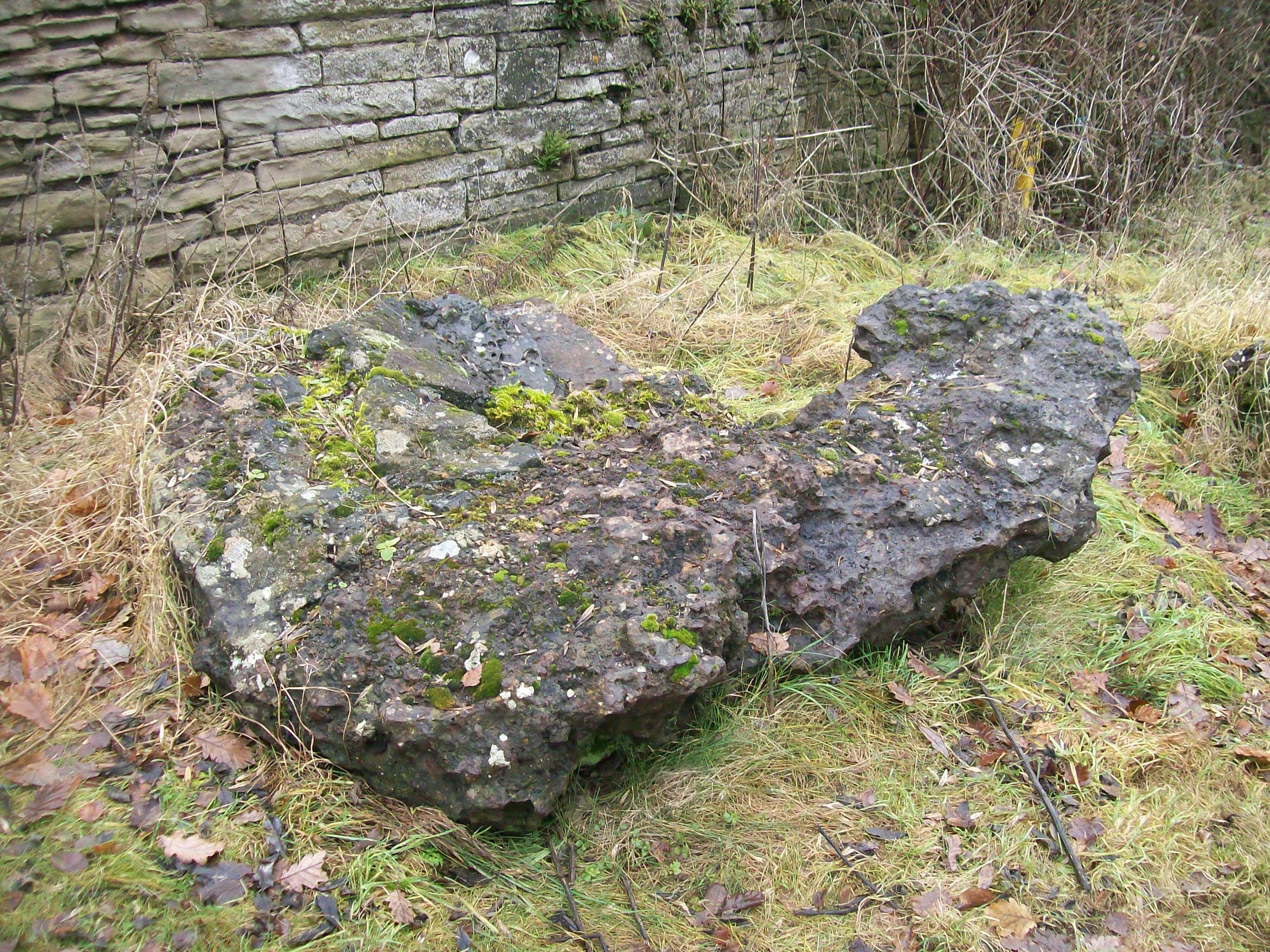
Clinker which remains on site

The first coke-fired blast furnace had been constructed in 1709, at Coalbrookdale in Shropshire, but it was almost a century later before they began to make an appearance in the Forest of Dean. Despite the presence of both extensive iron-ore reserves and coal measures, Forest of Dean coal did not produce coke which was ideal for smelting and local ironmasters were reluctant to invest in the new technology. Around 1820, however, Moses Teague, whilst borrowing the cupola furnace at Darkhill Ironworks, discovered a way to make good iron from local coke. To exploit his discovery, he re-opened Parkend Ironworks in 1824 and Cinderford Ironworks in 1829, greatly advancing the Forest of Dean iron industry.

While it could be argued that David Mushet's most important contributions to metallurgy were made prior to 1818, credit must be given to him for laying the foundations at Darkhill, both literal and metaphorical, upon which the achievements of his son Robert were built. Both men were great experimenters, with Robert carrying out over ten thousand experiments in just ten years, during his time at the Forest Steel Works. Robert took out fifty four patents on his work, but a lack of income and commercial acumen meant that he was never to receive full recognition, financial or personal, for his achievements.

Robert Mushet's first major contribution to metallurgy came in 1856 when perfected the Bessemer Process by discovering the solution to early quality problems which beset the process. Mushet patented his method, but it was allowed to lapse. Later, Bessemer claimed to have independently stumbled across the same solution. and Mushet, without a valid patent, received little credit. Whether or not the patents could have been sustained is not known, but the value of Mushet's procedure was shown by its near universal adoption in conjunction with the Bessemer Process.

In 1857, steel for the first steel railway lines was made at Darkhill and rolled at the Ebbw Vale Iron Company's works. They were laid near Derby railway station, on a heavily used section of track, where the Midland Railway had been replacing the iron rails every three to five months. After ten years of use, Robert Mushet's new rails showed no sign of wear. Aware of their historic importance, Robert Mushet made repeated requests for their return once they reached the end of their usable life – but they were scrapped in 1873.

In a second key advance in metallurgy Mushet invented 'R Mushet's Special Steel' (R.M.S.) in 1868. It was both the first true tool steel and the first air-hardening steel. It revolutionised the design of machine tools and the progress of industrial metalworking, and was the forerunner of High speed steel.

Darkhill Ironworks and the Titanic Steelworks were scheduled in November 2002. Included within the scheduled area are a section of tram-road, built to serve the furnaces, and a large lump of clinker, known as 'the bear'. The site is now preserved as an industrial archaeological site of international importance and is open to the public.

== See also ==
- Whitecliff Ironworks
- Parkend Ironworks
- Cinderford Ironworks
- Crucible steel
- Forest of Dean Coalfield
