= Cinderford Ironworks =

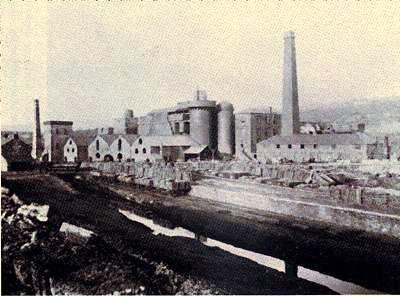
- c1890. Cinderford Ironworks

- Location in Gloucestershire
- 51.813727°N 2.508579°W
- Location: Gloucestershire, England, UK
- OS grid reference: SO 65036 12910

Cinderford Ironworks, also known as Cinderford Furnace, was a coke-fired blast furnace, built in 1795, just west of Cinderford, in the Forest of Dean, Gloucestershire, England.

== Background ==
The Forest of Dean, with its huge iron-ore reserves and ready supply of timber, had been an area of national importance in the production of iron, using charcoal, for hundreds of years. Even the name Cinderford is thought to have derived from the term sinders meaning clinker, that was left behind by early Roman ironworks (ford probably refers to the crossing over the Cinderford Brook). The first coke-fired blast furnace was constructed in 1709 at Coalbrookdale, in Shropshire. However, despite there also being extensive coal measures in the Forest of Dean, local coal did not produce coke that was ideal for smelting and the ironmasters were reluctant to invest in the new technology. It was not until the last decade of the 18th century that coke-fired furnaces began to make an appearance, with Cinderford, Whitecliff and Parkend Ironworks being built almost simultaneously.

== History ==
Work began on the ironworks in 1795; it was the first coke-fired blast furnace to be built in the Forest of Dean and probably came into blast in 1797, or possibly as late as 1798. It was built principally at the instigation of Thomas Teague, although it is unknown who the financial backers were. Coal was brought in by boat, along the Cinderford Canal from Broadmoor, just to the north. Iron-ore was brought in by mule, from Edge Hill and other mines.

It was working in 1806, but like Parkend Ironworks, probably ceased production around 1807. The reasons are not certain, but output had not reached 20 tons a week, which was exceptionally low. The difficulties may have been due to poor technical expertise, the unsuitability of the local coke, or perhaps both.

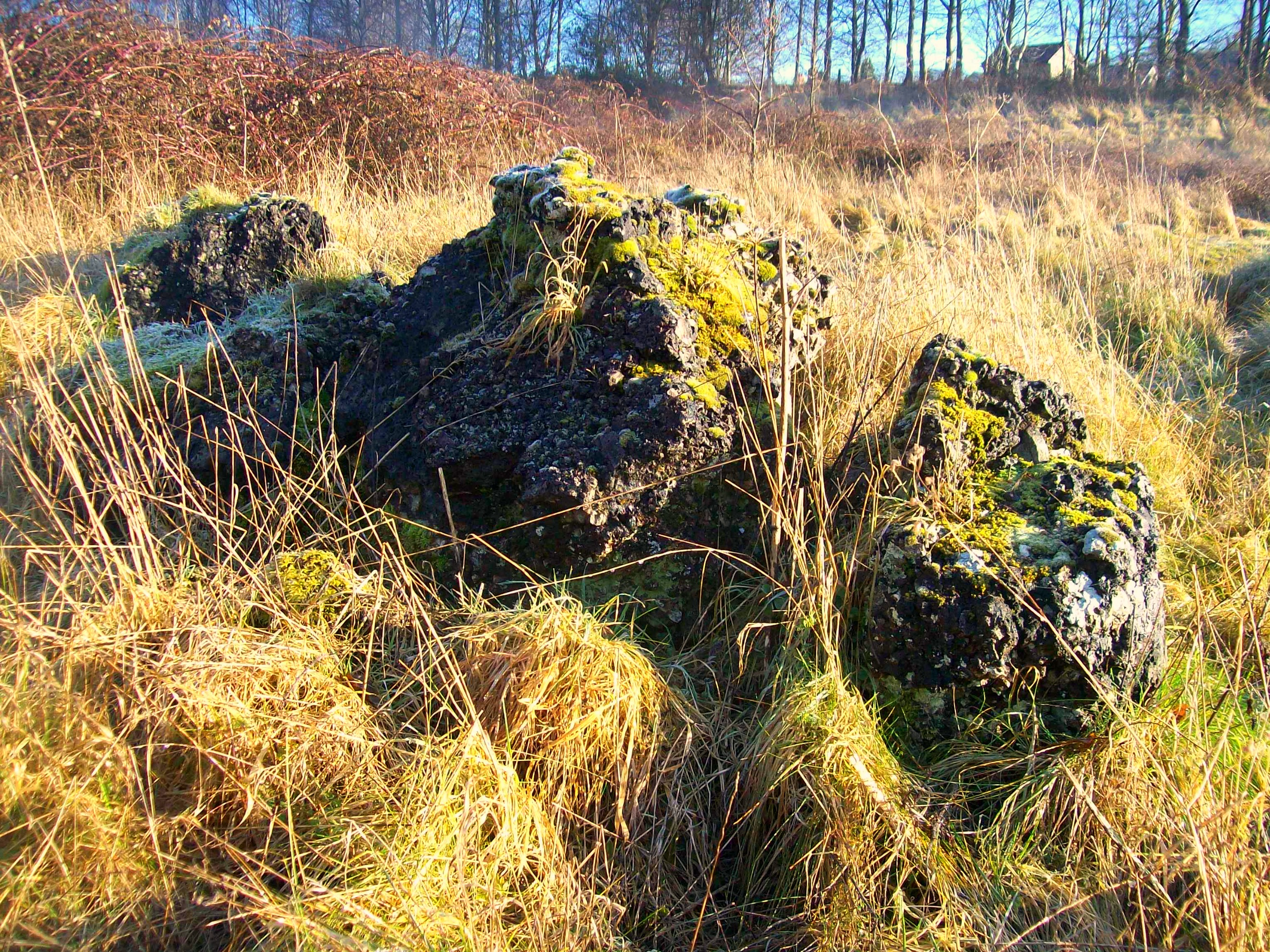
A large amount of clinker still exists at the site, but no other surface remains are visible.

Around 1820, Moses Teague, working at Darkhill Ironworks, discovered a way to make good iron from local coke. To exploit his discovery he re-opened Parkend Ironworks in 1824 and Cinderford Ironworks in 1829.

Activity ceased again in 1832, during an economic slump, but resumed in 1835 with financial help from William Crawshay, a Welsh ironmaster, of the Cyfarthfa Ironworks in Merthyr Tydfil. The Ironworks prospered for the next forty years; A second furnace was added around 1835 and in 1841 there were three furnaces producing 12,000 tons of iron a year. A fourth furnace was added sometime before 1855. Crawshay's son Henry, who ran the works from 1847, bought out the only other partner, Stephen Allaway, in 1862.

By the late 1870s, however, the iron trade went into recession and only two furnaces were in production at that time. Two new furnaces were built in 1880, but by 1890 only one was in blast. Cinderford Ironworks closed in 1894 and demolition was completed by 1901.

Today, very little remains are visible above ground.

== See also ==
- Whitecliff Ironworks
- Parkend Ironworks
- Darkhill Ironworks
