= Parkend Ironworks =

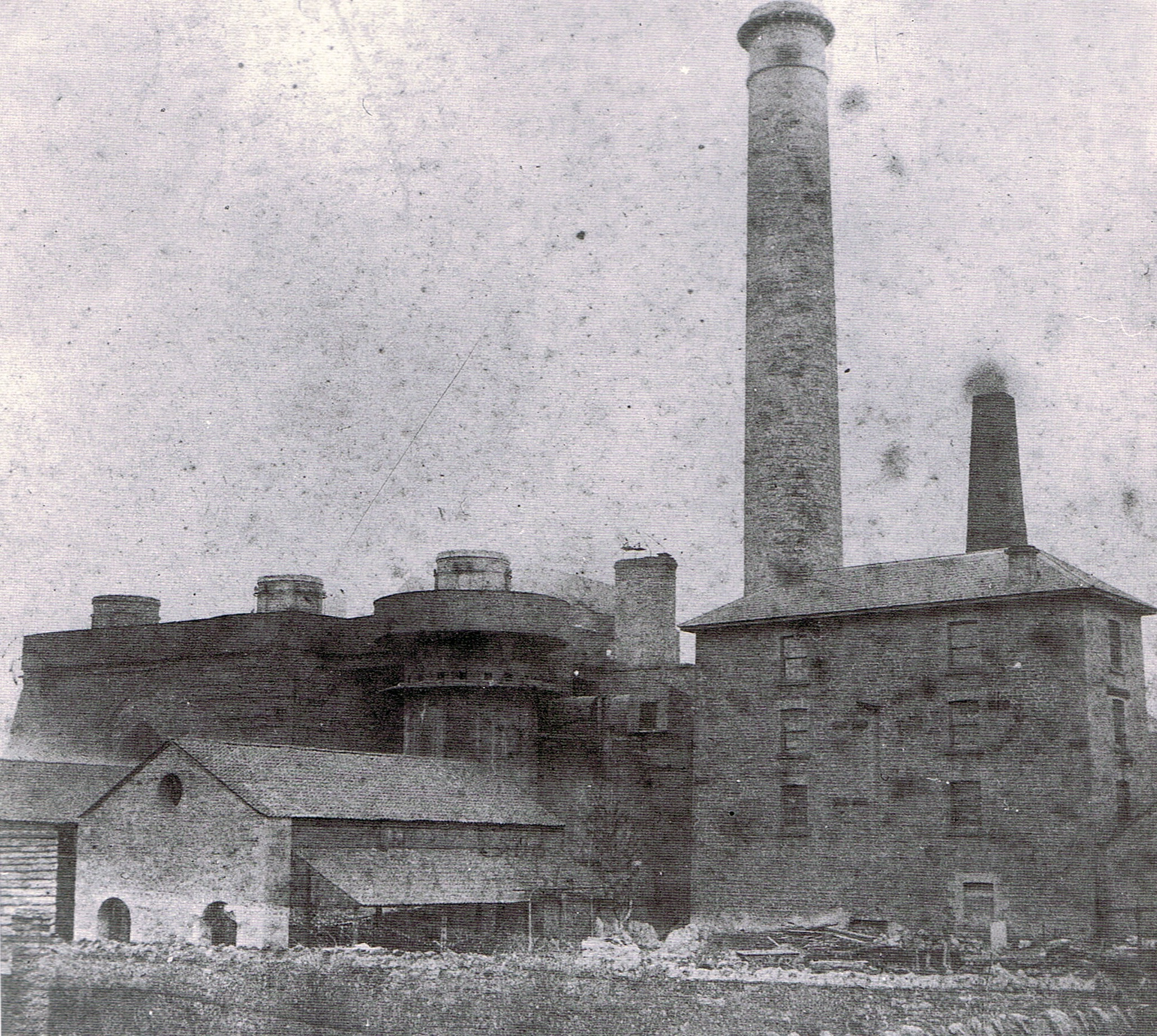
- c. 1880. Awaiting Demolition; the three furnaces can be seen on the left. The building to the right is the engine house which has survived.

- Location in Gloucestershire
- 51.768553°N 2.557111°W
- Location: Gloucestershire, England, UK
- OS grid reference: SO6168007887

Parkend Ironworks, also known as Parkend Furnace, in the village of Parkend, in the Forest of Dean, Gloucestershire, England, was a coke-fired furnace built in 1799. Most of the works were demolished between 1890 and 1908, but the engine house survived and is arguably the best preserved example of its kind to be found in the United Kingdom.

== Background ==
During the 17th century Parkend had been, at different times, the location of two charcoal-fired Crown furnaces, known as the King's Ironworks; In 1612 James I contracted the Earl of Pembroke to build and run a blast furnace and forge at ‘Parke End’, bringing with it the first real settlement at what was to become the village of Parkend. The furnace was destroyed on the orders of Parliament, during the Civil War, in 1644. After the war, in 1653, Parliament instructed that another furnace should be built, a short distance downstream from the first. Being located in a royal forest, control of the furnace returned to the Crown after the restoration of the monarchy in 1660. It ceased production, and was demolished, in 1674.

Iron was first successfully smelted with coke in 1709 at Coalbrookdale, in Shropshire. Despite there being extensive coal measures in the Forest of Dean, local coal did not produce coke that was ideal for smelting and Forest ironmasters were reluctant to invest in the new technology. It was not until the last decade of the 18th century that coke-fired furnaces began to make an appearance, with Parkend, and its many coalmines, once again considered an ideal location for iron production. It was one of three coke-fired ironworks, Cinderford and Whitecliff being the others, that were built almost simultaneously in the Forest.

== History ==
Work commenced on Parkend Ironworks in 1799. It was the third coke-fired ironworks to be built in the Forest of Dean, but was beset by technical problems and ceased production around 1807. Around 1820, Moses Teague discovered a way to make good iron from local coke, while working at Darkhill Ironworks. To exploit his discovery he formed the 'Forest of Dean Iron Co' and re-opened Parkend Ironworks in 1824.

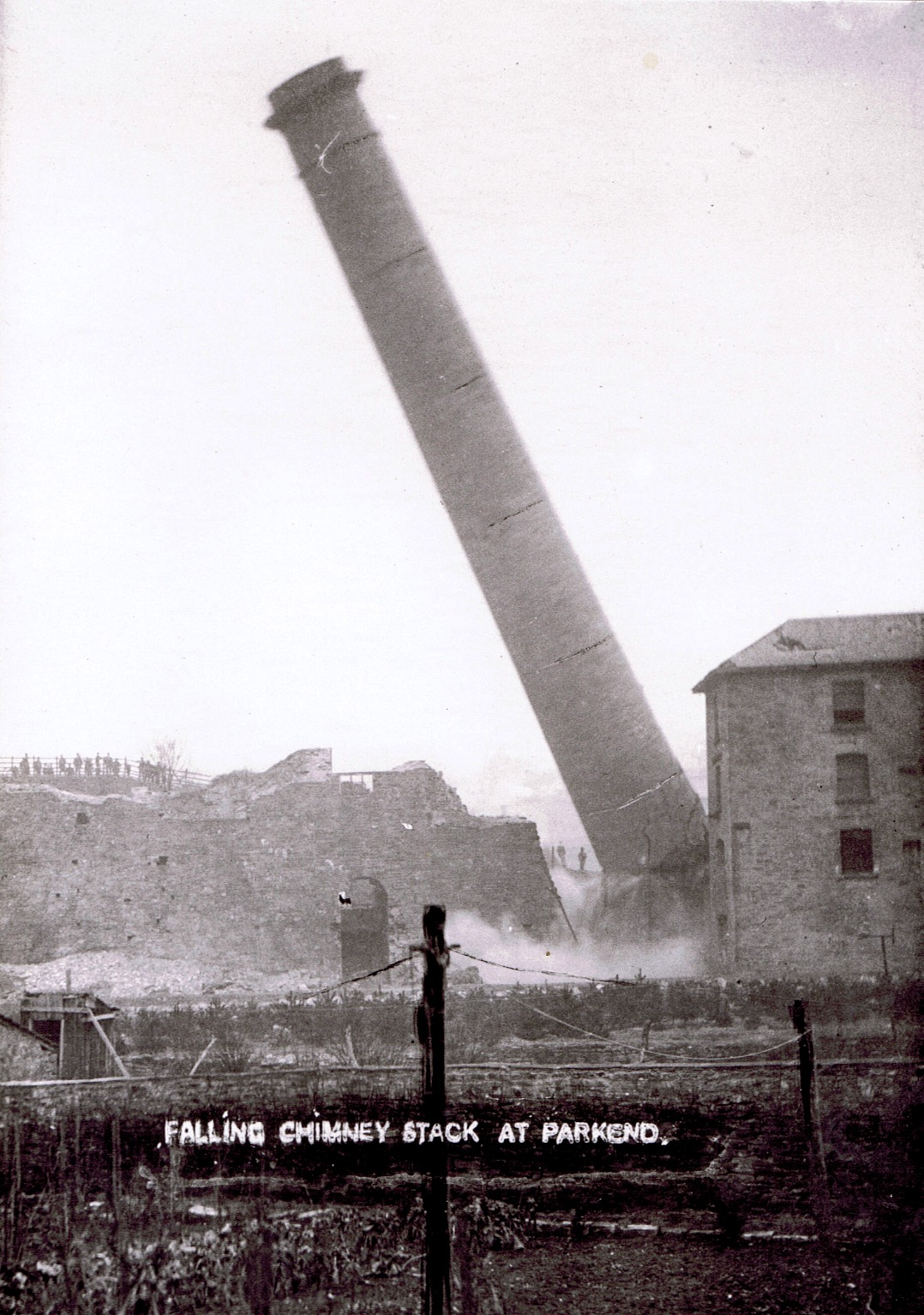
The chimney stack being felled in 1908.

The lower pond at Cannop was built in 1825 to provide a constant supply of water, and a 1.5 mile long leat constructed to transfer water to the top of a waterwheel, which was installed in 1827 to supply power for the blast. It was 51 ft in diameter and weighed 60 tons – reputedly the largest in Britain at that time. A second furnace was also erected in 1827. Despite the enormous effort expended in creating the supply of water, it proved inadequate and in 1828 a 90 horsepower steam engine and engine house were constructed alongside the works. A year later, a second pond at Cannop was also built to boost the water supply.

By 1835 the site had grown to include workers’ cottages, casting houses, blacksmith’s and carpenter’s sheds, a counting house, offices, a beerhouse, and many other ancillary buildings. In 1849 a second steam engine was added.

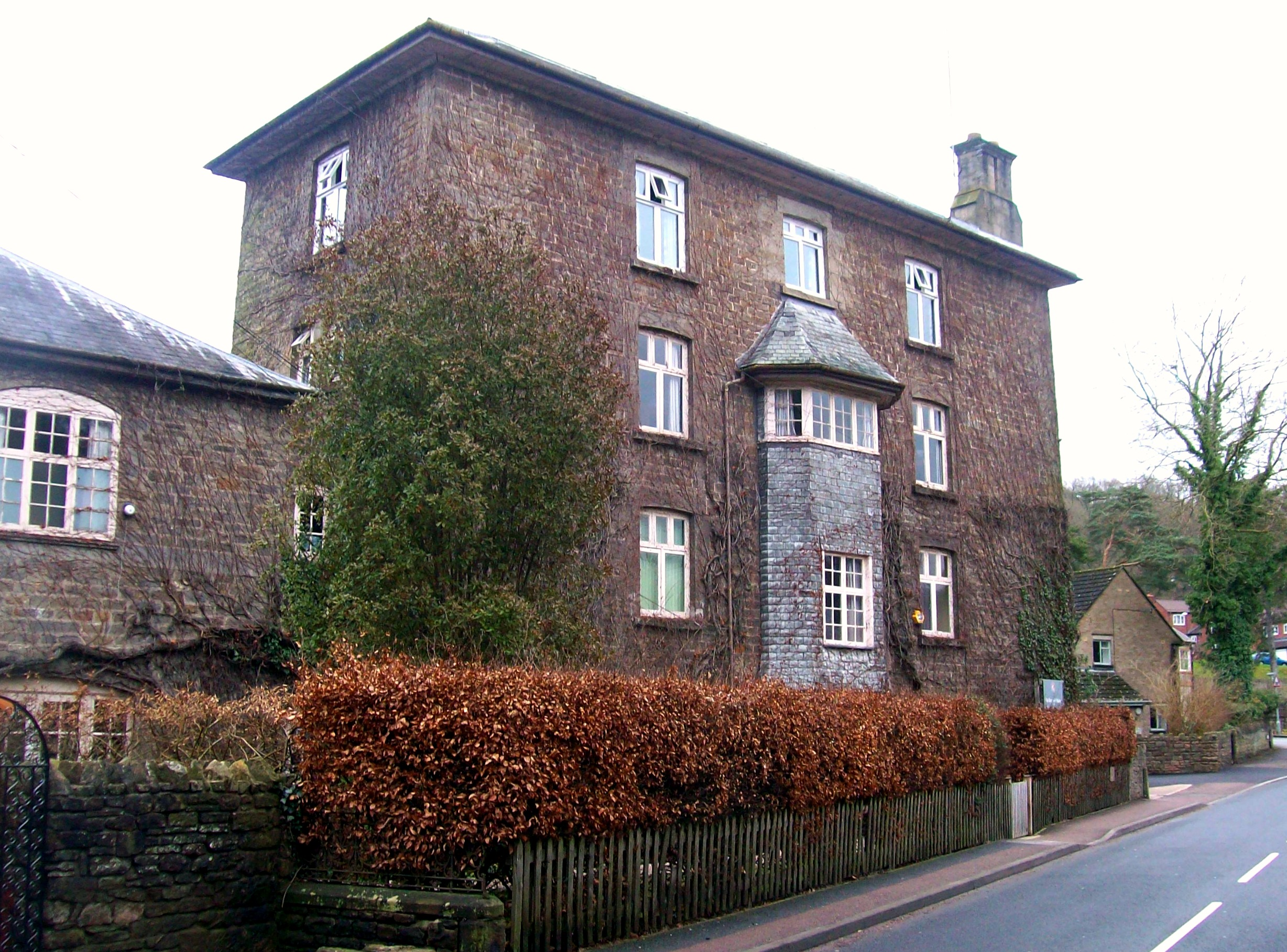
The 'engine house', as it is today

Business was booming and in 1871 a third furnace was also added; a ‘hot blast’ design which was the very latest technology at that time. Just four years later, however, the iron trade went into recession and the ironworks closed in 1877.

Most of the works were demolished between 1890 and 1908, but the engine house and some ancillary buildings survived to become the country’s first Forester Training School in 1910. During the Second World War, it was used by the American army as a barracks. In 1971 it was sold to Avon County Council and became the Dean Field Studies centre, now known as the Deanfield Outdoor Centre. In 1984 it was afforded Grade II Listed Building protection. The building is not open to the public, but can be viewed from the roadside.

== See also ==
- Cinderford Ironworks
- Whitecliff Ironworks
- Darkhill Ironworks

== Sources ==
- Anstis, Ralph (2009). The Story of Parkend. ISBN 978-1-899889-04-4.
