= Coleford, Gloucestershire =

Market town in Gloucestershire, England

Coordinates: 51.7910°N 2.6162°W

Coleford
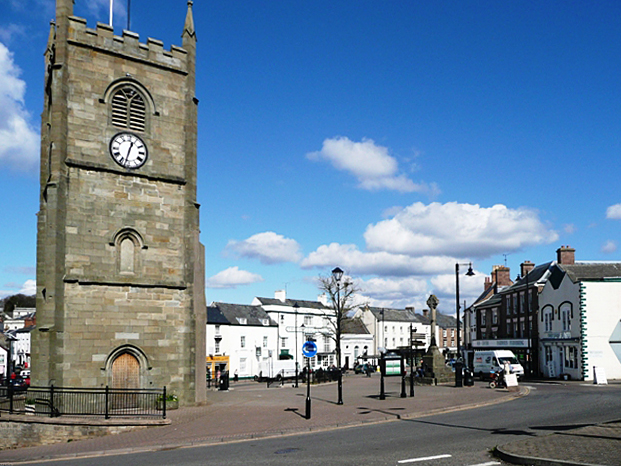
- Coleford Market Place

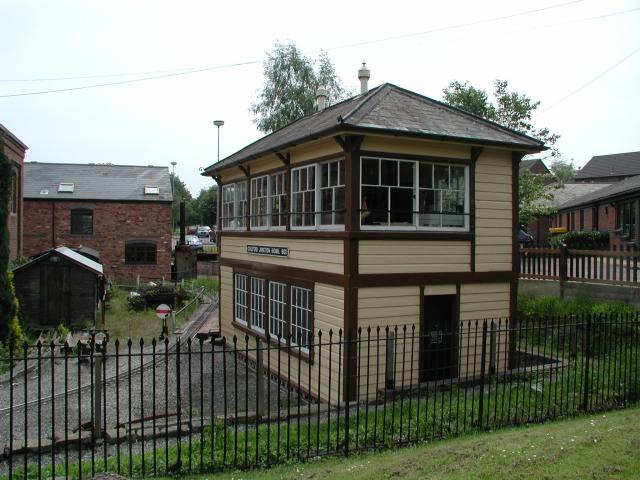
- Coleford Railway Museum

- Location within Gloucestershire
- Population: 9,273 (2021 Census)
- OS grid reference: SO5710
- District: Forest of Dean
- Shire county: Gloucestershire
- Region: South West
- Country: England
- Sovereign state: United Kingdom
- Post town: COLEFORD
- Postcode district: GL16
- Dialling code: 01594
- Police: Gloucestershire
- Fire: Gloucestershire
- Ambulance: South Western
- UK Parliament: Forest of Dean

Coleford is a market town in the west of the Forest of Dean, Gloucestershire, England, two miles (3 km) east of the Welsh border and close to the Wye Valley. It is the administrative centre of the Forest of Dean district. The combined population of the town's two electoral wards at the 2011 census was 8,359. The population of the town's parish was 9,273 in the 2021 Census. The parish includes the village of Baker's Hill.

== History ==
Coleford was originally a tithing in the north-east corner of Newland parish. The settlement arose at a ford through which charcoal and iron ore were probably carried. By the mid-14th century, hamlets called Coleford and Whitecliff had grown up in the valley of Thurstan's Brook. Coleford had eight or more houses in 1349 and was described as a street in 1364. It had a place of worship by 1489. In 1642 the commander of a parliamentary garrison in Coleford started a market in the town, as the nearest chartered market in Monmouth was under royalist control.

Coleford soon saw some action in the English Civil War. On 20 February 1643, Lord Herbert, the Earl of Worcester's eldest son and the King's Lieutenant-General of South Wales, marched through Coleford heading for Gloucester, at the head of an army of 500 horse and 1500 foot. At Coleford their progress was impeded by a troop of Parliamentarians under Colonel Berrowe, aided by a disorderly group of country people. A skirmish ensued, in which the market-house was burnt and Major-General Lawday, who commanded the foot, and two other officers were shot dead from a window. Colonel Brett was then put in command of the foot, Lord John Somerset continuing at the head of the horse. The Royalists forced a passage through, after capturing Lieutenant-Colonel Winter, together with some other officers and soldiers, and so putting the Parliamentarians to flight. They then marched unimpeded to Gloucester.

After the Restoration, a market was granted in 1661 and a new market house built in 1679. Much building took place in the town, which was thought by 1710 to have 160 houses. Of the older surviving buildings in the market place, the Old White Hart Inn dates from the 17th century. In the late 18th century and early 19th, the town expanded along its other streets and most of its older houses were rebuilt. The Angel Inn, which had opened by the 1650s, was re-fronted or rebuilt around 1800. For many years it housed an excise office. In the mid-18th century it was the town's principal coaching inn and used for public meetings and assemblies. The number of public houses increased as the town grew in importance. By 1830 there were seven or eight, most of them in the market place, and also a larger number of beerhouses.

The market house (or town hall) was rebuilt on a larger scale in 1866. Also in the market place was the church, which was rebuilt on an octagonal plan in 1820, but proved too small for the growing congregation and was pulled down in 1882, its tower being retained for a clock tower. A much larger church, St John the Evangelist's, was built on a hillside overlooking the town. This church was closed in 2016 and its building put up for sale. Expansion continued in piecemeal fashion throughout the 20th century, through both council and private development. Traffic congestion in the market place was eased by demolition of the town hall in 1968 and the introduction of a gyro system around the clock tower.

=== Industry ===
Iron production in Coleford dates back to the Middle Ages. This produced large quantities of waste material or cinders. Some formed prominent mounds, which by the late 17th century were reworked to provide iron ore for the furnaces, which had become more efficient by then. The medieval ironworks were moveable forges operating on the royal demesne woodland of the Forest of Dean. An ore smithy or furnace was operating at Whitecliff in 1361, and the hamlet had several in the 15th and 16th centuries. In the later Middle Ages, iron was also worked in Coleford town, where there was a furnace next to the chapel in 1539.

There was coalmining to the north and east of Coleford from the 16th century. Limestone was also quarried at the south-west end of Whitecliff before the 17th century. Lime kilns operated at Whitecliff, and Scowles, which supplied much lime to Monmouthshire.

In 1798, work began on Whitecliff Ironworks on the south-western edge of Coleford. The furnace there probably began firing in 1801 or 1802, and a second one beside it before 1808. The output was limited by the quality of coke required. In 1809 David Mushet, a noted metallurgist, was employed to increase productivity, but the works remained unprofitable and Mushet withdrew from the venture after a few months. The furnaces were abandoned several years later, perhaps by 1812 and certainly by 1816. The surviving ruins can be viewed by the public.

=== Transport ===
Coleford was on the route of a tramway that opened in 1812 to link mines in the Forest with the River Wye at Redbrook and Monmouth. This continued in use until its track east of Coleford was lifted in the late 1870s.

The first railway to reach Coleford, a branch line from Parkend, was opened by the Severn and Wye Railway Company in 1875. It ran through Milkwall to a station on the south-east side of the town. A second railway, the Coleford Railway from Monmouth, used parts of the old tramway route and was completed in 1883. It included a short tunnel at Whitecliff and crossed the Newland road to reach a station next to that of the Severn & Wye Co. A junction was made between the two railways in 1884, after the Monmouth line was taken over by the Great Western Railway. The Severn and Wye line ceased passenger services in 1929. And was then closed in 1967. The track between Whitecliff and Parkend was removed by 1971. Some railway buildings at Coleford, including a goods shed, were incorporated in the Coleford Great Western Railway Museum that opened in 1988.

The nearest railway station today is Lydney (8 miles, 13 km).

=== Churches ===
The Anglican Holy Trinity Church near the centre of Coleford was built in 1831. It has services on Sunday and Wednesday. Coleford Baptist Church has a Sunday service, as does the town's Pentecostal Church. Both have Facebook pages.

== Today ==
Coleford adapted more ably to the mine closures of the 1950s than its neighbour, Cinderford. Their prime location in the heart of the Forest make them popular with walkers and cyclists and the local council has made moves to encourage further visitors. The large factory in the town, originally called Carters, then Beechams, then GlaxoSmithKline, is now owned by the Japanese firm Suntory. It is the sole production facility for Ribena and Lucozade. One surviving building is the former goods shed for the defunct railway line to Monmouth. This now houses the Coleford GWR Museum.

SPP Pumps Ltd, Britain's leading pump manufacturer has its main UK manufacturing site at Coleford, where it employs over 300 people. It mainly caters to the industrial and offshore firefighting oil and gas markets, and to the UK municipal water market.

== Media ==
Local news and television programmes are provided by BBC West and ITV West Country. Television signals are received from the Mendip and the local relay transmitters.

Local radio stations are BBC Radio Gloucestershire, Heart West, Greatest Hits Radio South West, and Dean Radio, a community based radio station.

The town is served by the local newspaper, The Forester.

== Noted inhabitants ==
- Olly Alexander (born 1990), singer and actor
- Alan Cornwall (1898–1984), county cricketer and Marlborough College schoolmaster
- Paul Groves (living), poet and schoolteacher, lived locally from 1971 to 1996.
- Edna Healey (1918–2010), author and wife of Denis Healey (1917–2015), was born in the Forest and lived in Coleford.
- Mary Howitt (1799–1888), author of over 200 books, was born here.
- Alex McLean (born 1975), electronic musician
- David Mushet (1772–1847), Scottish metallurgist who pioneered techniques for iron production, lived in Coleford from 1810 to 1844.
- Dennis Potter, author and playwright who frequently used the region as a setting in his work, was born near Coleford.
- Shoo Rayner (born 1956), children's writer and illustrator
- Andrew Taylor (born 1951), author

== Gallery ==
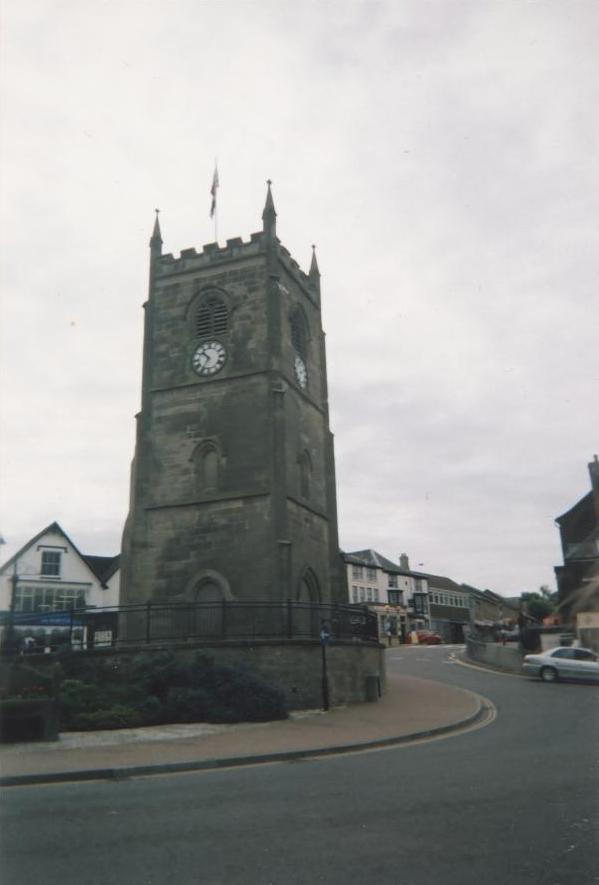
Coleford clock tower

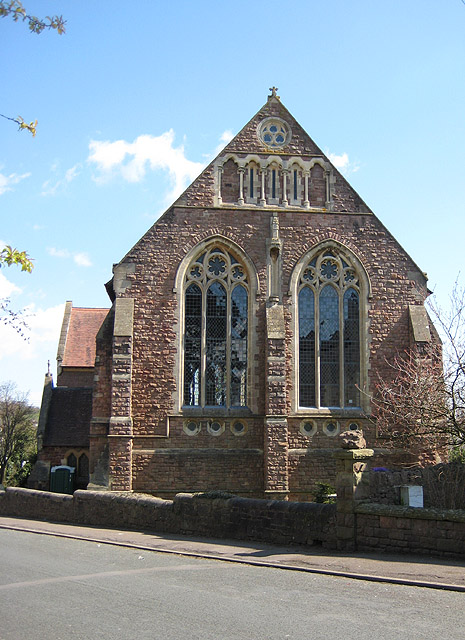
The Parish Church of Coleford, St John the Evangelist

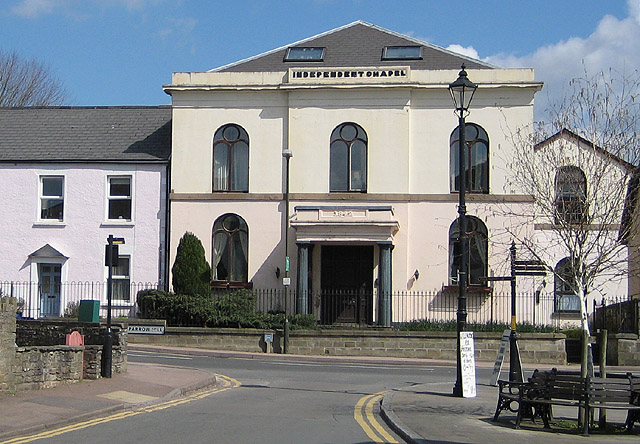
Former Independent Chapel

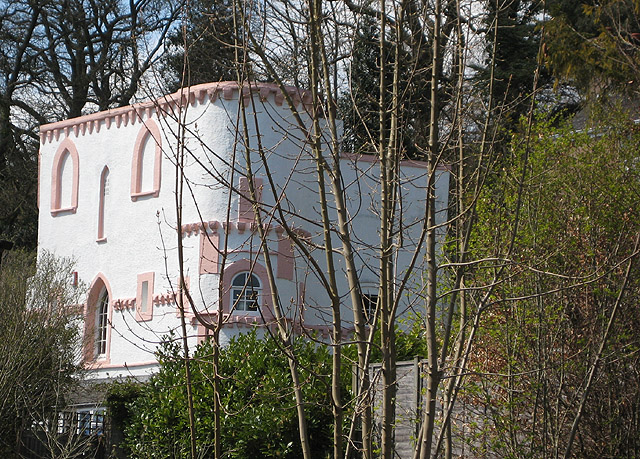
A pink and white house (Rock Castle Dental Practice)

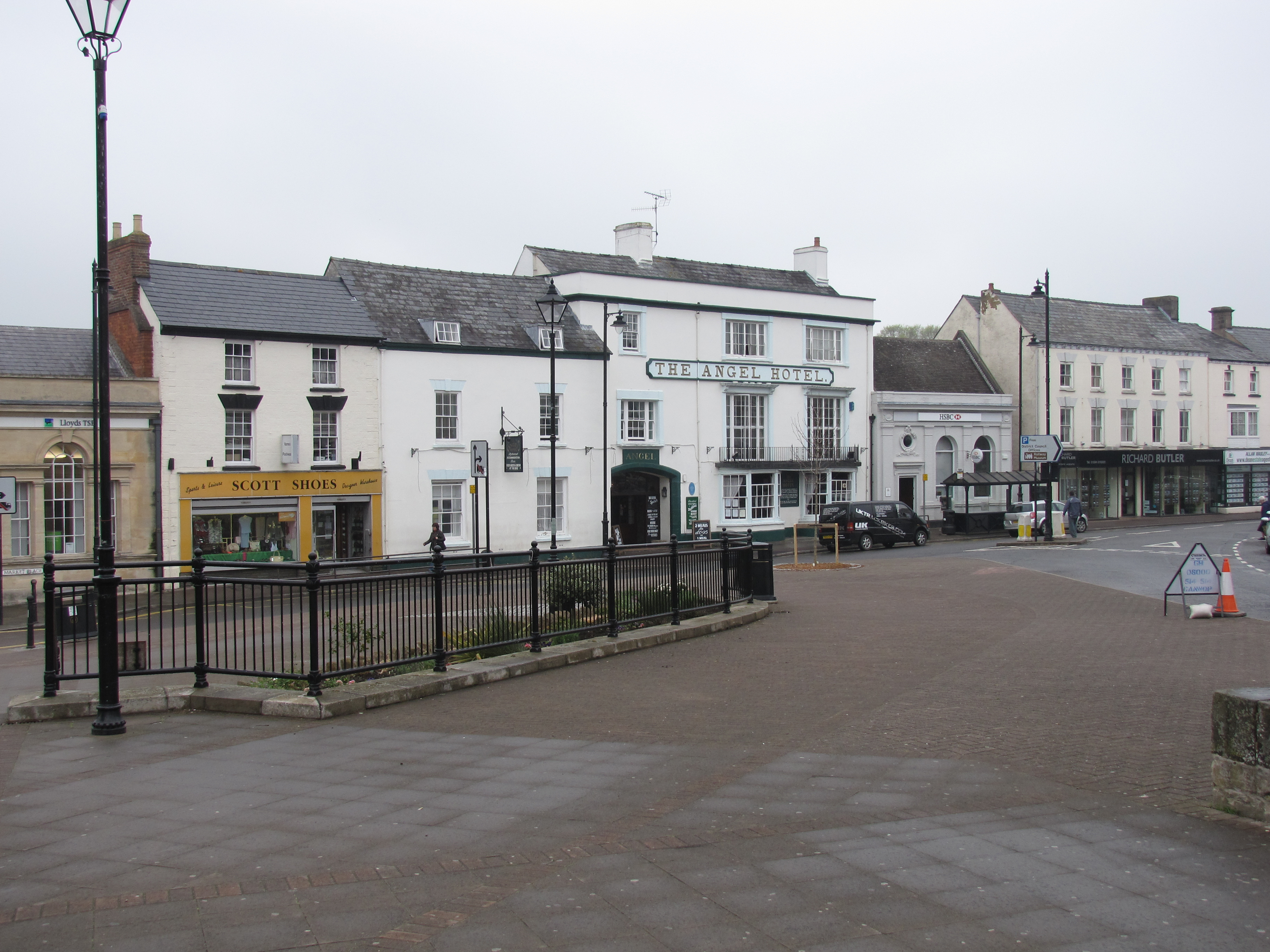
The Angel Hotel, behind the site of the old Market Hall

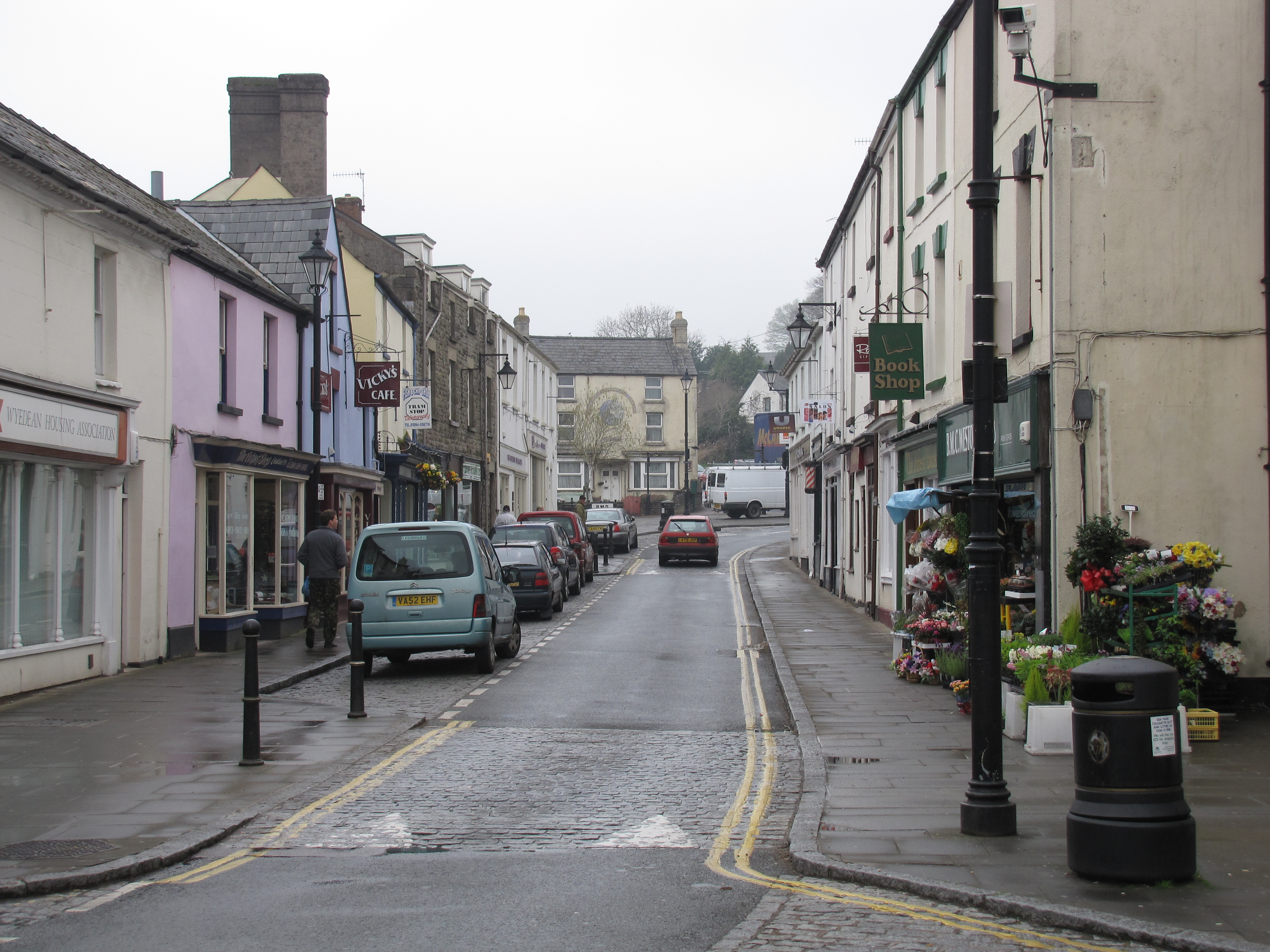
St John's Street, in the centre of Coleford

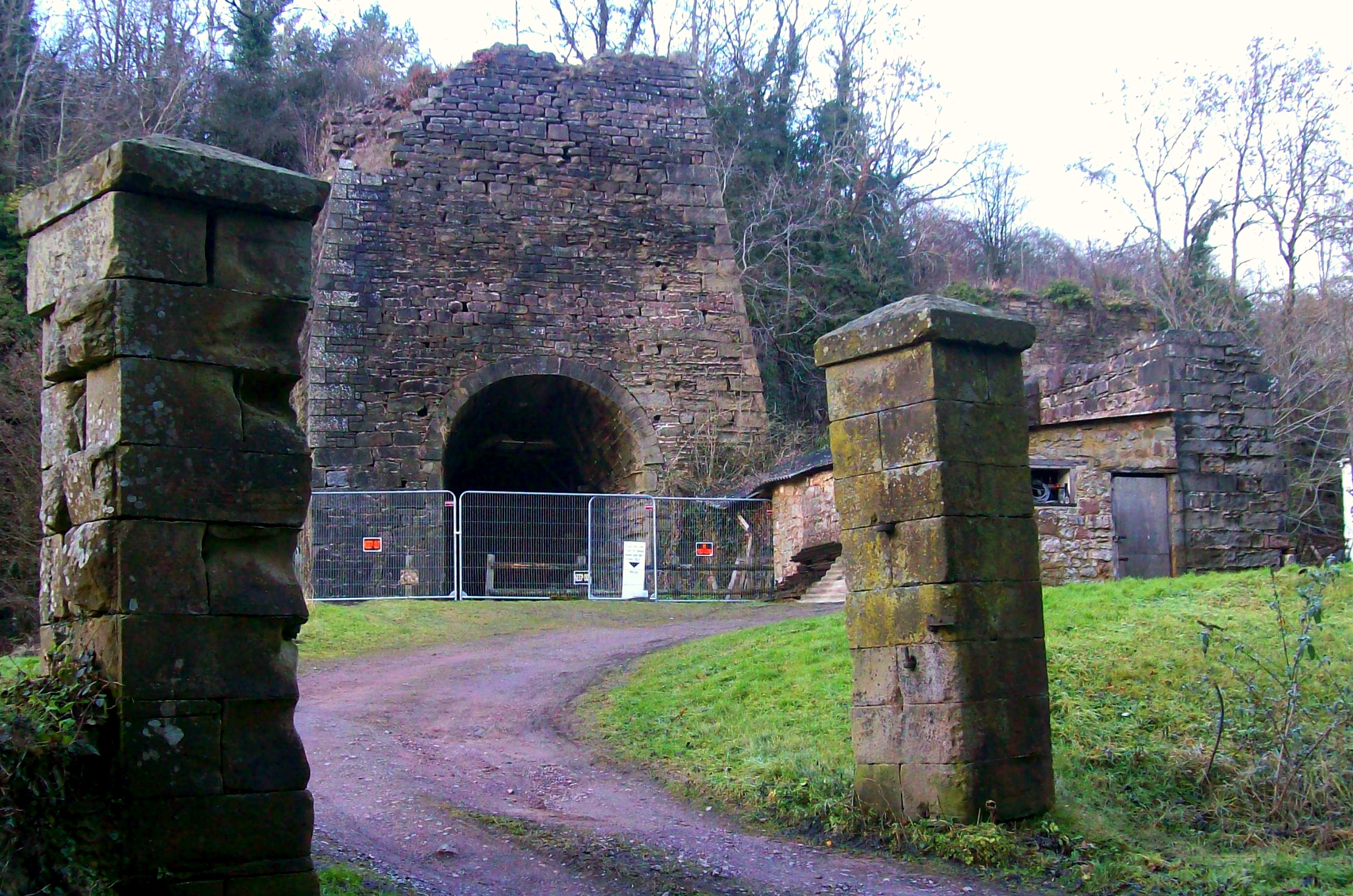
Whitecliff Ironworks, on Newland Street

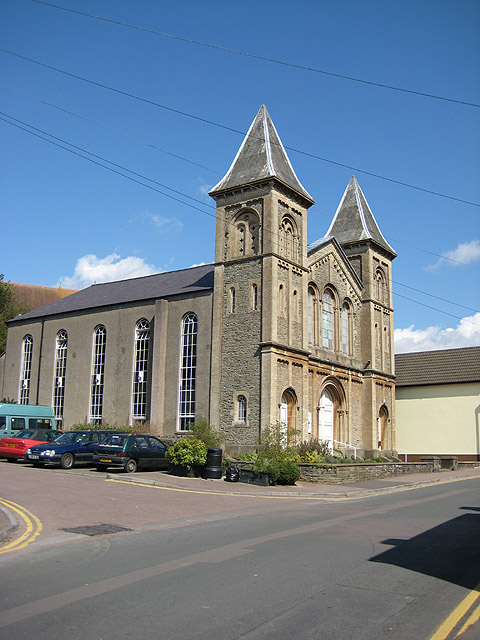
Coleford Baptist Church
