= David Mushet =

Scottish engineer (1772–1847)

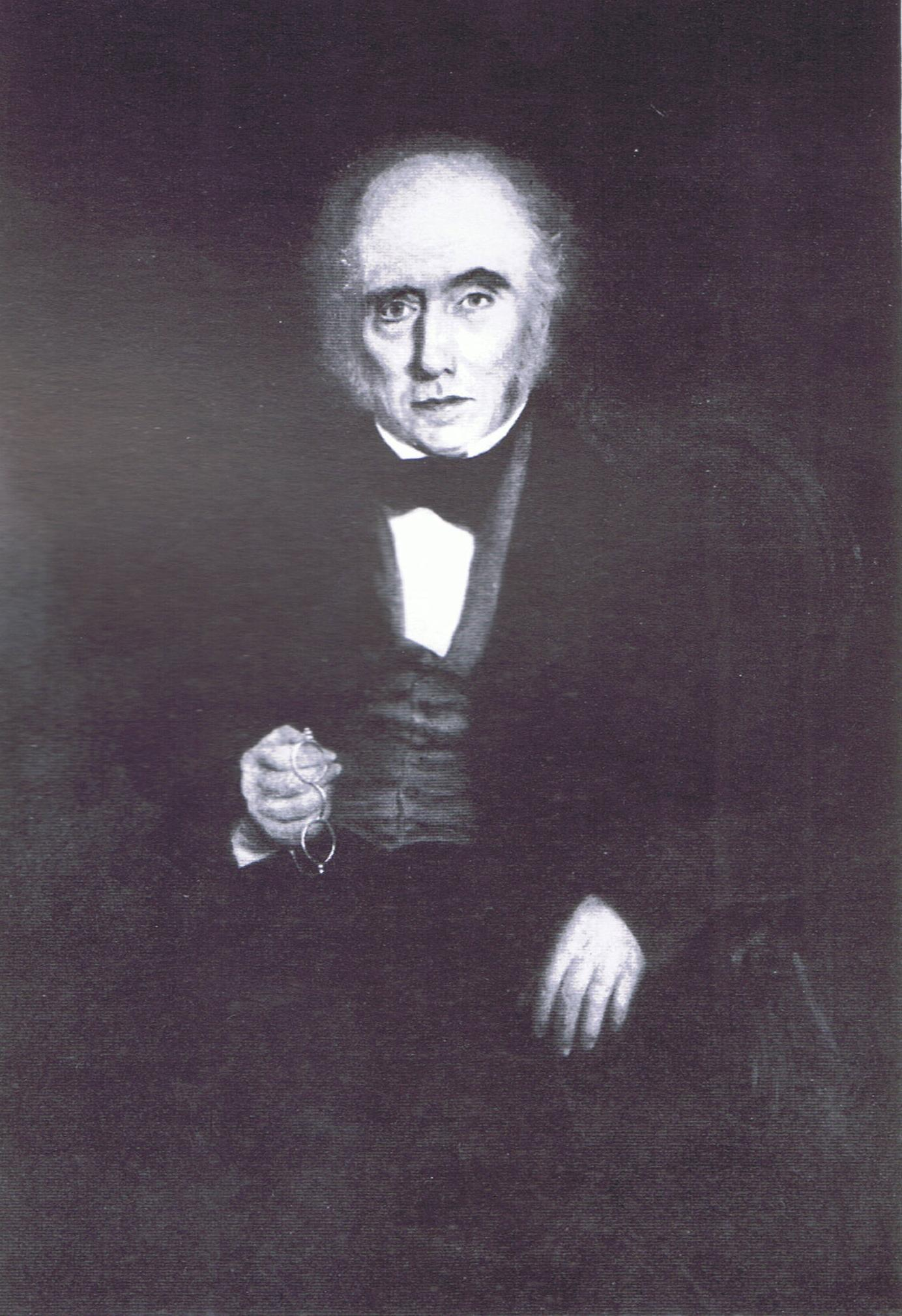
- Born: 2 October 1772; Dalkeith, Midlothian
- Died: 7 June 1847 (aged 74); Monmouth
- Resting place: All Saints churchyard, Staunton
- Occupation: Metallurgist
- Known for: Inventing a method to produce refined iron direct from the blast furnace, without the need for a separate refinery.
- Parent(s): William Mushet, Margaret Cochran

David Mushet (2 October 1772 – 7 June 1847) was a Scottish engineer and assayer, known for his inventions in the field of metallurgy. Mushet was an early advocate of animal rights.

== Early life ==
Mushet was born on 2 October 1772 in Dalkeith near Edinburgh, the youngest son of Margaret Cochran and William Mushet. He was educated at Dalkeith Grammar School.

When Mushet was a boy, his father (a weaver by trade) established a foundry at Croft Street in Dalkeith. He would sometimes accompany him at the ironworks and it was on these visits that the first seeds of his lifelong obsession with iron-making were sown.

== Career in Scotland ==
Mushet left school at the age of 19, but did not go to work at his father's foundry. Instead, being good at mathematics, he began work as an accountant at the Clyde Iron Works near Glasgow. Alongside his bookkeeping duties, he read extensively on the subject of iron making and, after a staff reduction was made in 1793, he began a series of experimental researches.

At first, these were encouraged by his employers, and he even taught assaying to the manager's son; but later, and without reason given, he was prohibited from experimenting during work hours. Forced to continue his experiments outside office hours, he frequently worked until the early hours of the morning and in just a few years he became an established authority on the manufacture of iron.

In 1800, he patented a process to make cast steel from wrought iron, which he then sold to a Sheffield firm for £3,000. His employers, becoming jealous of him, dismissed him from the Clyde Iron Works in the same year.

The following year, with the help of partners including William Dixon (1753–1824), he bought and rebuilt the Calder Iron Works, where he continued his experiments. It was here he made his second great discovery; in 1801, he demonstrated that 'Black-band Ironstone', which he discovered while crossing the North Calder Water, and typically found with a thin seam of inferior 'wild Coal', could be used to economically produce iron. Previously, this abundant resource had been viewed as a useless form of coal, and while the discovery brought little financial reward to Mushet personally, the use of Black-band Ironstone that was to lead to a remarkable expansion of the Scottish iron industry and eventually brought millions of pounds profit to Scottish industrialists.

By 1805 Mushet had published some thirty papers in Philosophical Magazine. In his book, Man of Iron – Man of Steel, historian Ralph Anstis writes that Mushet was now "looked up to as an authority both at home and abroad on matters connected with iron and steel making. Not unnaturally, perhaps, he was becoming dissatisfied with the limitations imposed by the Calder Iron Works and, restive for wider experience and greater opportunities, decided to move on".

== Career in England ==
In 1805 Mushet moved to Derbyshire, to become manager of the Alfreton Ironworks. While working there, he joined the Geological Society and wrote several authoritative articles on iron which were published in magazines and encyclopaedias, including the Encyclopædia Britannica. However, he did not enjoy perfect relations with his colleagues.

In 1808 Mushet was approached by Thomas Halford, a wealthy investor from London, who owned two furnaces at Whitecliff, in the Forest of Dean, Gloucestershire. Halford was having difficulty with the quality and quantity of iron being produced at his works and offered to pay for Mushet's help in overcoming the production problems he was encountering.

Mushet designed and supervised a major rebuilding of the Whitecliff Ironworks, but the time he was spending in the Forest of Dean became instrumental in the complete breakdown of relations with his colleagues at the Alfreton works. In February 1810 he moved to Coleford to take up full-time management of the Whitecliff works; buying a quarter share of the business. Some weeks later he was joined by his wife, Agnes, and their six children.

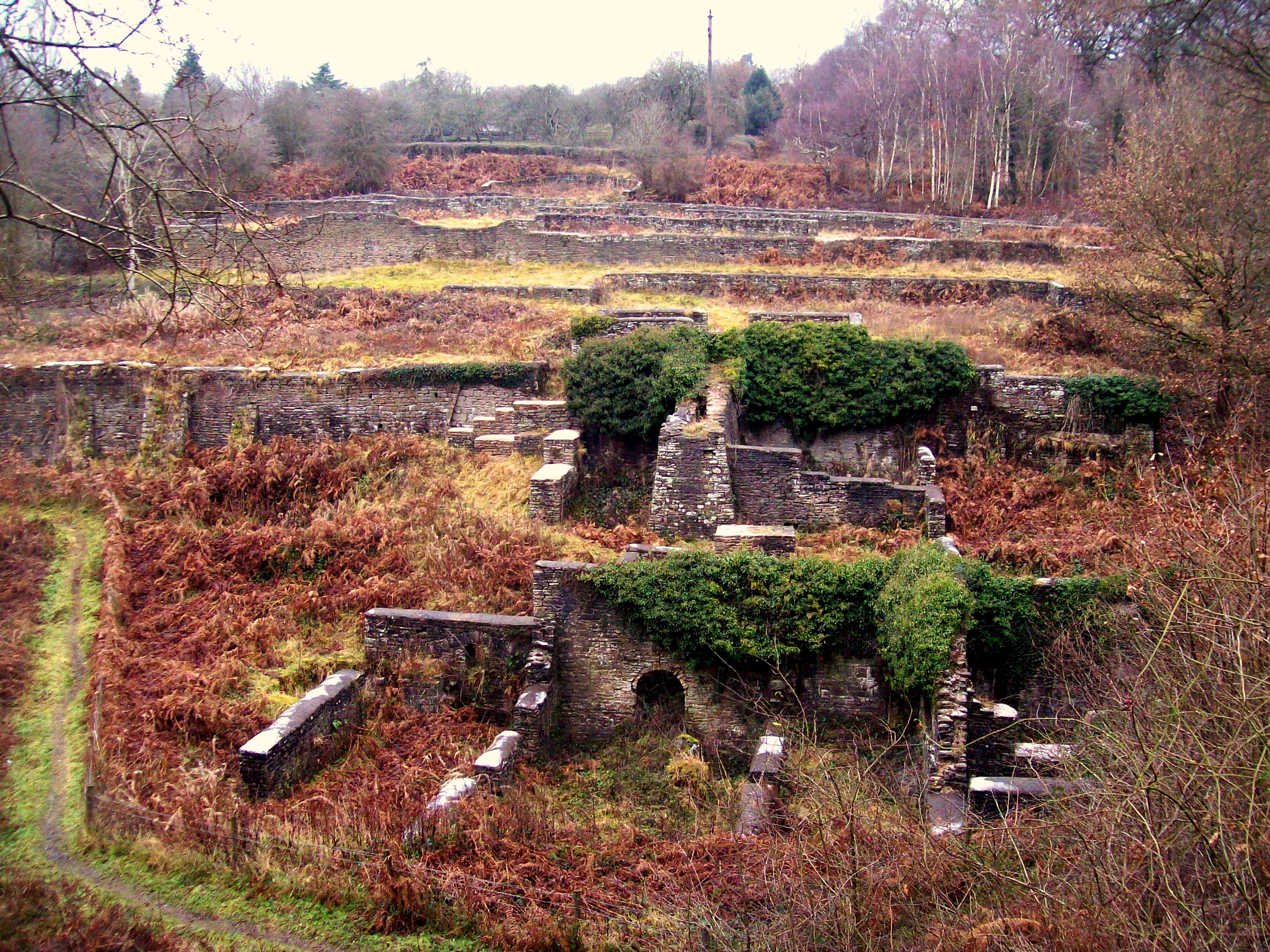
Remains of Darkhill Ironworks.

Mushet ran the furnaces at Whitecliff for six months, but then quickly disengaged himself from the partnership. He was not known to act impulsively, and the reasons for this decision are not fully known. Possibly Halford, the majority partner at Whitecliff, suffered a collapse of his other business interests, for it is known that he became bankrupt in 1816

From the time he had arrived in the Forest of Dean, Mushet had been shrewd in making investments in local industries, predominantly coal, and it seems that for several years he was able to live off the proceeds from these investments. During this time he carried out experiments in a stone barn, in a field adjoining his house. In 1815, he discovered a way to produce refined iron directly from the blast furnace, without the use of a separate refinery, and took out a patent on the process. Some of the iron produced was in fact steel, and for ten years he shaved using a pair of razors made at this time.

In 1818/9 he built a foundry at Darkhill, in the Forest of Dean. Although he did produce significant quantities of iron for sale there, the larger part of the works was given over to research and experimental production. He was appointed a director of the British Iron Company in 1826 although not without misgivings among some of the shareholders as to his suitability for such a post.

By the late 1820s he had built up a considerable empire, which included both iron and coal mines, and shares in the tramroads which connected them. He was also on the committee of the Severn and Wye Railway and Canal Company and used his position to stifle the expansion of steam railways into the Forest; which threatened the monopoly of his tramroads.

In 1845 David retired to Monmouth and conveyed Darkhill to his 3 sons, with the youngest, Robert Mushet, becoming the manager.

The remains of Darkhill are now preserved as an Industrial Archaeological Site of International Importance and are open to the public.

== Family life ==
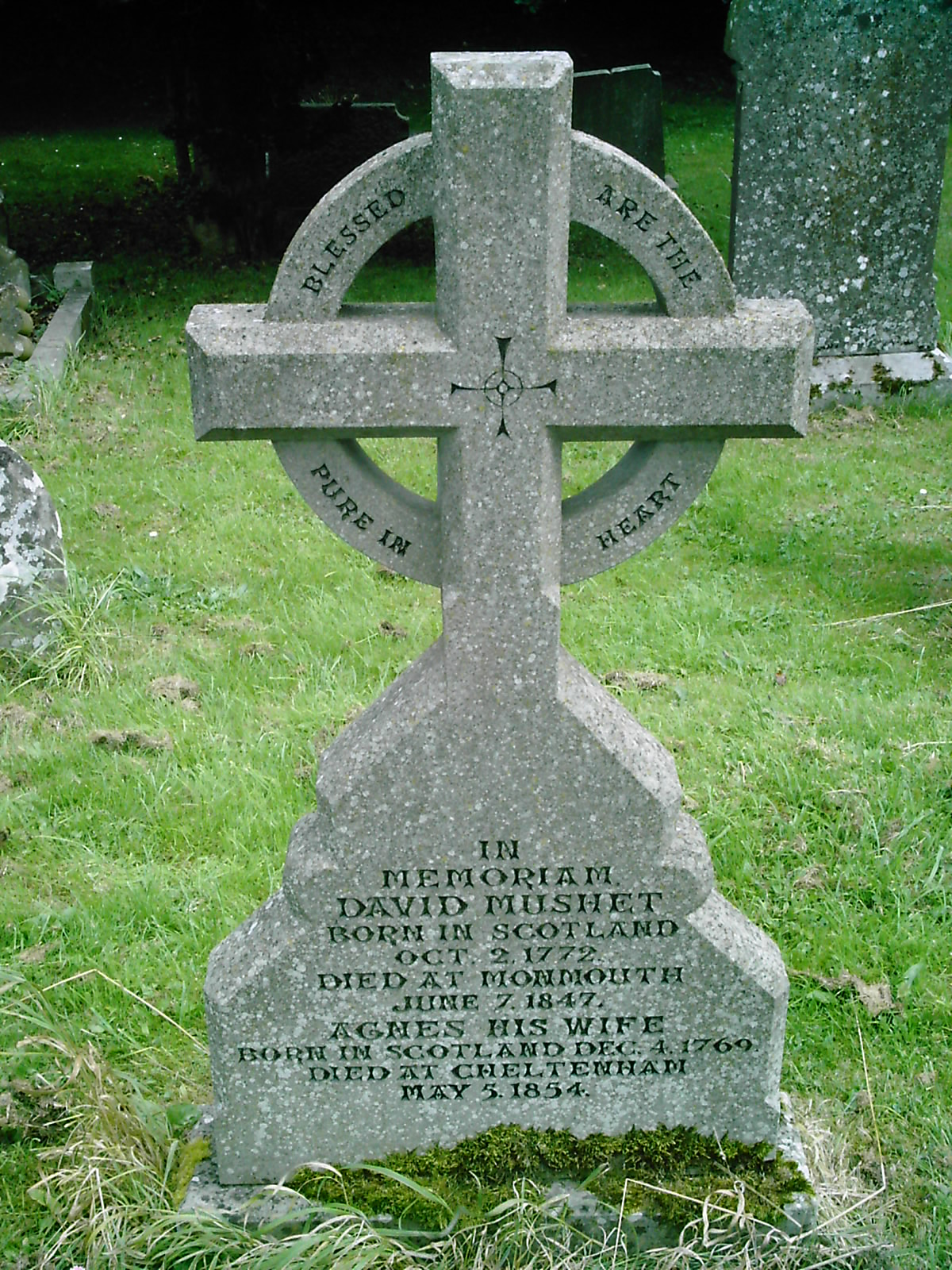
Grave of David and Agnes Mushet

Mushet married Agnes Wilson in 1798 and their first child, Margaret, was born in 1799. Their second child, Hariot, was born in 1801, but died a few months later. Henrietta was born in 1802, followed by his first son, William, in 1803, and David, in 1805. All these children were baptised in Monkland Parish Church, Lanarkshire. James was born in 1807, after the family's move to Derbyshire, followed by Agnes in 1809.

Robert, the last of the children, was born in Coleford on 8 April 1811. He spent his formative years studying metallurgy with his father and was also to become a noted metallurgist, though was never to receive full recognition, financial or personal, for his achievements.

Mushet's success in the field of iron production was not mirrored in his family life. His relationship with his wife Agnes and his sons was often cold and, in the case of his sons, sometimes even involved communication via solicitors. Soon after his death, a friend was to write that he had, in the last years of his life, been "visited with some extremely heavy and unnatural family afflictions".

David Mushet died at Monmouth on 7 June 1847, but even in death was surrounded by bitter and public family feuding. During his later years Mushet had often pleaded poverty and soon after his death, his friend John Upton made a public appeal for donations to support Mushet's widow. In a letter to the Mining Journal, Mushet's son David attacked Upton, referring to his "beggarly and impertinent account of my father's circumstances" and stating that his father had left his family considerable property. Mushet's son Robert then joined in, attacking David in a letter to the same publication, writing that, had David attended his father's funeral, he might have "learnt more accurately how matters really stood with their widowed mother".

Mushet's wife, Agnes, died in 1854 and they are buried together in Staunton churchyard, in the Forest of Dean.

== Animal rights ==
Mushet was an early advocate of animal rights and opponent of vivisection but was not a vegetarian. He authored an essay which was entered into a writing competition sponsored by the Society for the Prevention of Cruelty to Animals. His essay condemned animal cruelties such as hunting, overworking of stagecoach horses and the use of dogs as draught-animals. It was published as The Wrongs of the Animal World, in 1839.

== Selected publications ==
- The Wrongs of the Animal World (1839)
- Papers on Iron and Steel, Practical and Experimental (1840)

== See also ==
- Whitecliff Ironworks
- Darkhill Ironworks
