= Whitecliff Ironworks =

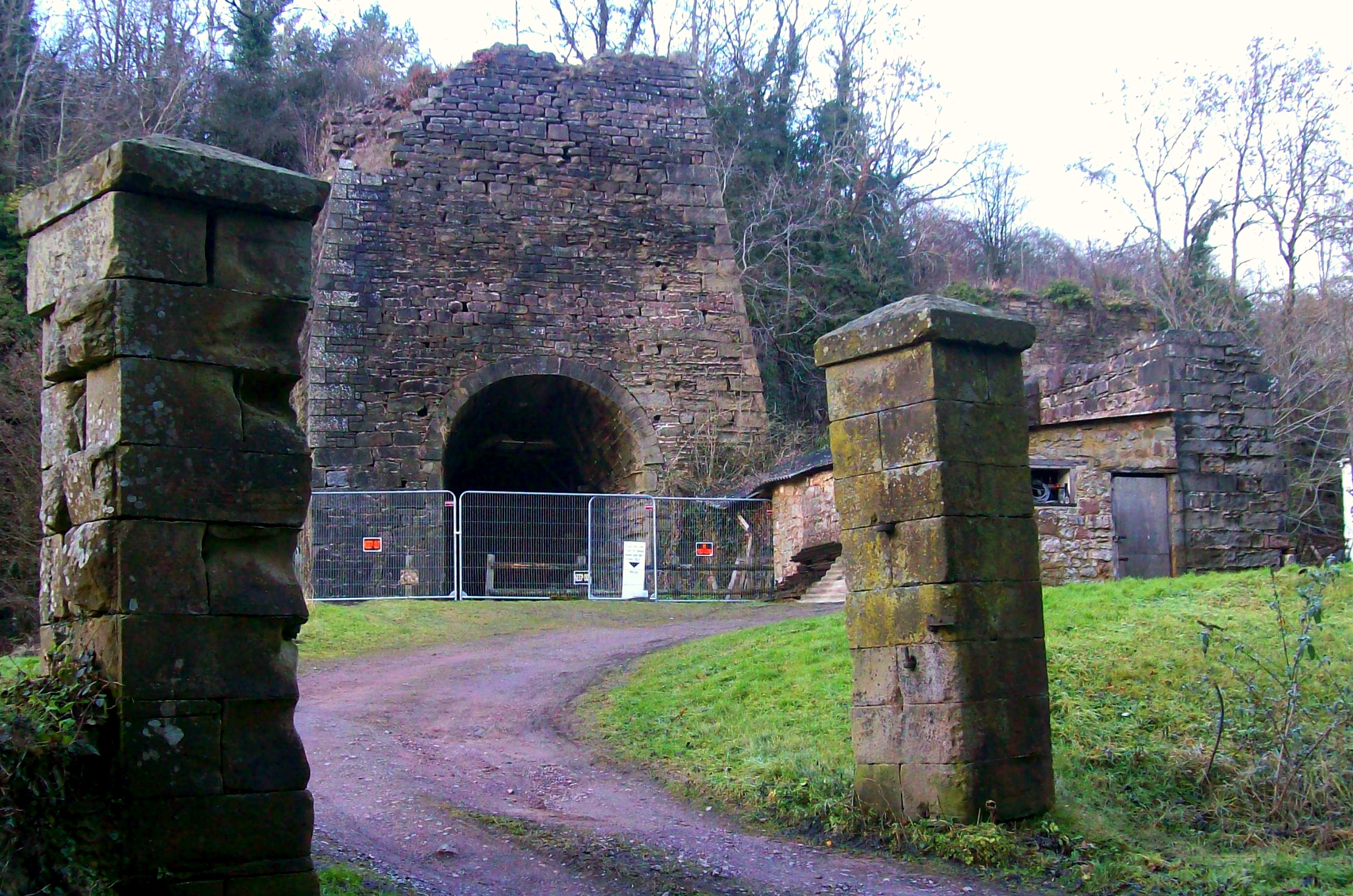

- Location in Gloucestershire
- 51.788373°N 2.626623°W
- Location: Gloucestershire, England, UK
- OS grid reference: SO56751005

Whitecliff Ironworks, sometimes referred to as Whitecliff Furnace, at Coleford, in the Forest of Dean, Gloucestershire, England, are industrial remains associated with the production of iron, using coke, in the Forest of Dean.

== Background ==
The first coke-fired blast furnace was constructed in 1709 at Coalbrookdale in Shropshire. With its huge iron-ore reserves and ready supply of timber, the Forest of Dean had been an area of national importance in the production of iron, using charcoal, for hundreds of years. Despite there also being extensive coal measures, Forest of Dean coal did not produce coke which was ideal for smelting and local ironmasters were reluctant to invest in the new technology. It was not until the last decade of the 18th century that coke-fired furnaces began to make an appearance in the Forest of Dean, with Cinderford, Whitecliff and Parkend Ironworks being built almost simultaneously.

== History ==
In 1798, work commenced on Whitecliff Ironworks; the second coke-fired furnace to be constructed in the Forest of Dean. The main impetus behind its construction came from Shropshire, although the partnership responsible almost certainly included James Teague, an industrious entrepreneur from Coleford. The building phase was badly affected by flooding, but the furnace was 'blown in' in 1801 or 1802. By 1808 most of the original partners had sold their shares and Whitecliff was now owned by Thomas Halford, James Teague, Isaiah Birt and Wickenden. Teague was in charge of the day-to-day running of the site, but Halford, a London stockbroker, was the majority shareholder and the driving force behind all the activities there. Halford was not satisfied with the output the ironworks were achieving and in 1808 he approached David Mushet, a noted Scottish metallurgist, offering to pay him for his advice on a major rebuilding of the works. Mushet designed and supervised the project, between 1808 and 1810, while at the same time managing the Alfreton Ironworks in Derbyshire.

Mushet moved to Coleford to take up full-time management of the Whitecliff works in February 1810, after Halford had bought out his partners, and entered into a new partnership with Mushet and a man named Spicer; who had been brought in by Halford as a major investor.

After just six months Mushet quickly disengaged himself from the partnership. He was not known to act impulsively, and the reasons for this decision are not fully understood. The Forest of Dean Local History Society attribute it mainly to a difference of opinion with Halford, though letters between the two, from 1810 to 1812, show them as being on good terms after the split. It has also been suggested that Halford, the majority partner, may have suffered a collapse of his other business interests, for it is known that he became bankrupt in 1816. However, Forest of Dean historian, Ian Standing, points out that it was Halford who bought Mushet's shares upon his departure and he attributes the most likely cause to be technical problems due to a 'combination of difficult ore and an expensive and unsuitable coke'.

Whatever the reason, in late 1810, or possibly early 1811, Mushet left Halford to run Whitecliff on his own. The scale of iron making at Whitecliff, after 1810, is unknown, but it had ceased completely by 1816 and possibly as early as 1812. There is no evidence that iron was ever produced again at the site and it seems there was then a period of rapid decline. A large quantity of items 'connected to the blast apparatus' were transferred to Cinderford Ironworks in 1827. A map dated 1852 shows the structures almost as they appear today although, in the intervening years, it is clear they have been used as a source of building stone.

As part of their centenary celebrations, research into the site was carried out by Samuel Osborn & Company in the late 1940s, and featured in the Dean Forest Guardian in 1949. Interest in the Whitecliff works continued to grow after it featured in several books during the 1950s and 60s. In August 1968 Whitecliff Furnace finally became the subject of a Building Preservation Order, but it was not until 1981 that preservation work was undertaken.

The remains of Whitecliff Ironworks were bought by the Dean Heritage Museum Trust in 1983.

A £65,000 refurbishment programme commenced in August 2011, funded by the Heritage Lottery Fund and Forest of Dean Local Action.

The Whitecliff site is open to the public for viewing only.

== See also ==
- David Mushet
- Blast furnace
- Cinderford Ironworks
- Parkend Ironworks
- Darkhill Ironworks
