= Bullo Cross Halt railway station =

Disused railway station

Bullo Cross Halt

General information
- Location: Newnham, Forest of Dean; England
- Coordinates: 51.7882°N 2.4565°W
- Grid reference: SO686100
- Platforms: 1

Other information
- Status: Disused

History
- Original company: Great Western Railway
- Pre-grouping: Great Western Railway
- Post-grouping: Great Western Railway

Key dates
- 3 August 1907: Station opened
- 3 November 1958: Station closed
Location

Bullo Cross Halt railway station is a disused railway station opened by the former Bullo Pill Railway, later known as the (Great Western Railway) Forest of Dean Branch.

== History ==
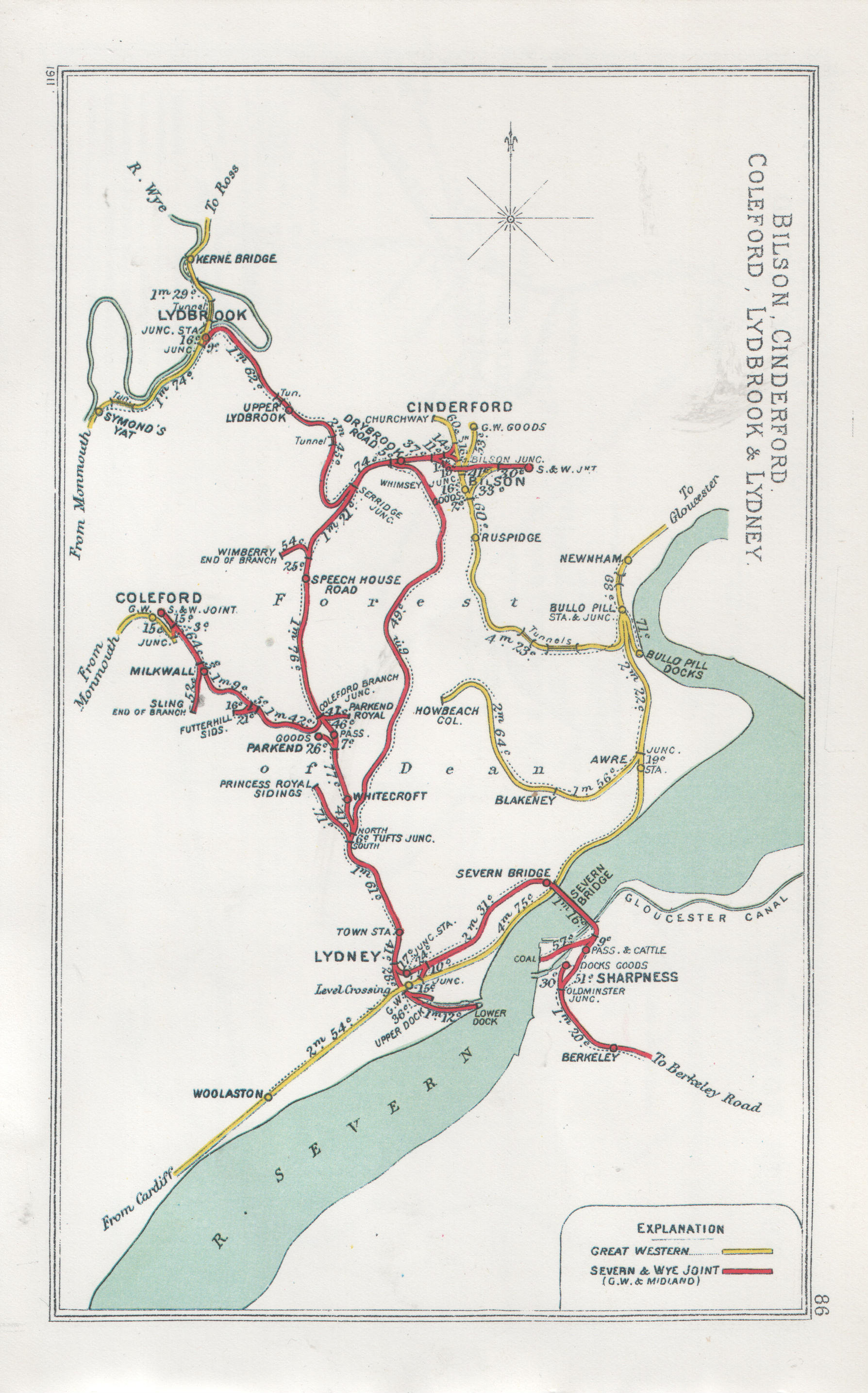
A 1911 RCH map of railways in the vicinity of Bullo Cross Halt.

The Halt, which was located 1 mile 37 chains (2.4 km) from Newnham on a 1 in 54 gradient.

The Halt consisted of a 153-foot (47 m) long wooden platform that was at originally at "rail level".

Although the station was served by railmotor services and auto-trains which had folding steps, the platform was raised from 1 foot 2 inches (36 cm) to the standard height of 3 feet (91 cm). This was authorised on 5 November 1908 at a cost of £423.

The station opened when the passenger services were introduced in August 1907.

A station building was not supplied until 1918, when a spare shelter was moved from (the recently closed) Ruddle Road Halt.

Unfortunately, the wooden platform and pagoda style station building suffered "fire damage beyond repair" in August 1933 and were subsequently replaced.

== Services ==
Preceding station	Disused railways	Following station
Ruddle Road Halt; Line and station closed	Great Western Railway; Bullo Pill Railway	Upper Soudley Halt; Line and station closed
