= Staple Edge Halt railway station =

Former railway station in England

Staple Edge Halt

General information
- Location: Ruspidge, Forest of Dean; England
- Coordinates: 51.8014°N 2.5102°W
- Grid reference: SO649114
- Platforms: 1

Other information
- Status: Disused

History
- Original company: Great Western Railway
- Pre-grouping: Great Western Railway
- Post-grouping: Great Western Railway

Key dates
- 3 August 1907: Station opened
- 3 November 1958: Station closed
Location

Staple Edge Halt railway station is a disused railway station opened by the Great Western Railway (GWR) on the former Bullo Pill Railway, later known as the GWR Forest of Dean Branch.

== History ==
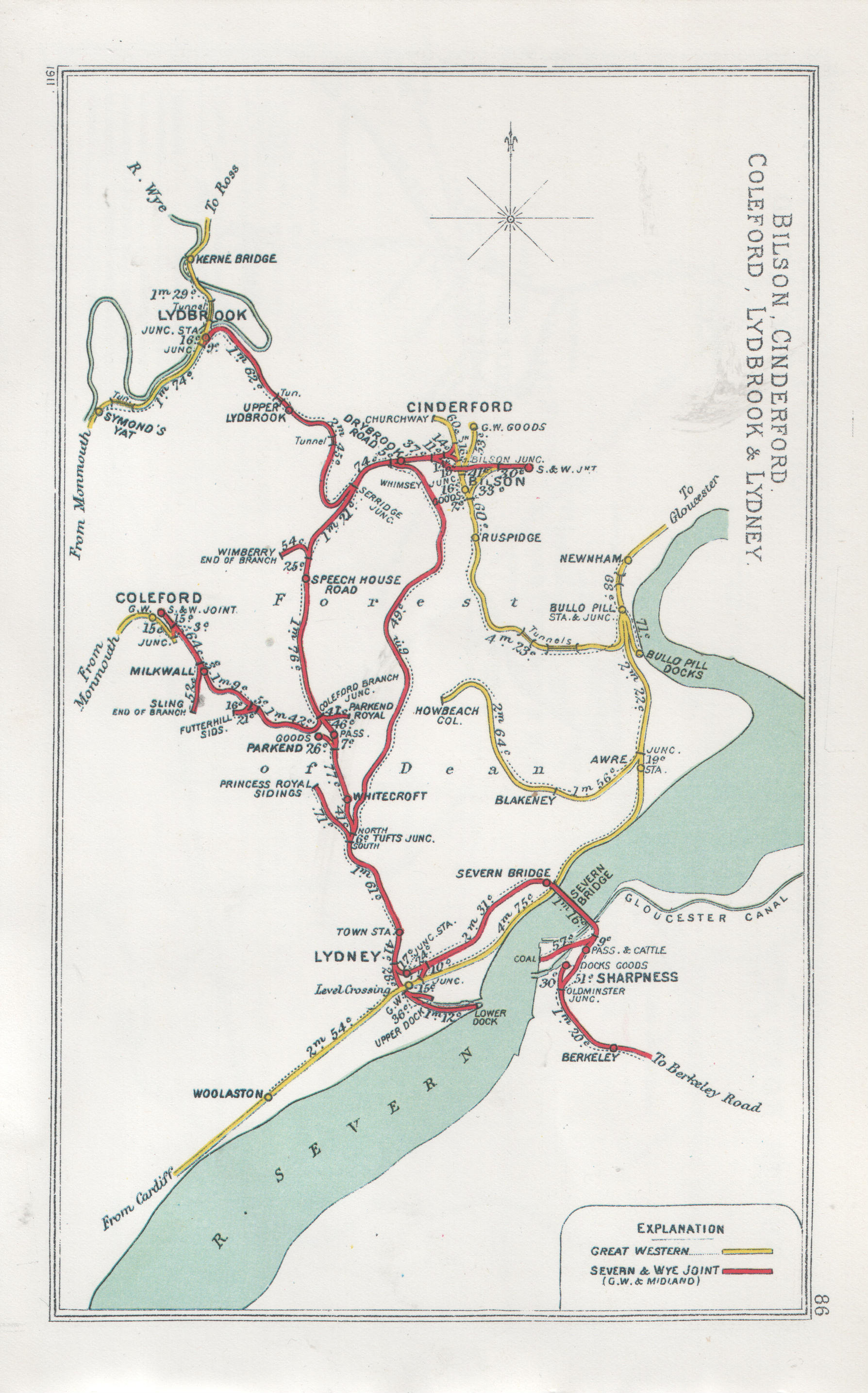
A 1911 RCH map of railways in the vicinity of Staple Edge Halt.

The Halt was located about 3 miles 15 chains (5.1 km) from Newnham on a 1 in 71 gradient.

The station opened when the Passenger services were introduced on 3 August 1907 and served the cottages that were owned by H. Crawshay & Co., the staple edge brickworks and Eastern United Colliery.

The low platform was constructed from wood. A pagoda style building was provided from the outset.

A two-lever ground frame gave access to the sidings of Eastern United Colliery until 1912 when a new goods loop was provided on the west side of the single line.

The points and signals were worked from a new 21 lever signal box, containing a frame of 17 working levers and 4 spare. The new facilities had been installed and were in use by December 1913.

The frame was later extended to 23 levers in the connection with the installation of the Cast House Sidings on the East side of the single line.

== Services ==
Preceding station	Disused railways	Following station
Upper Soudley Halt; Line and station closed	Great Western Railway; Bullo Pill Railway	Ruspidge Halt; Line and station closed
