= Upper Soudley Halt railway station =

Former railway station in England

General information
- Location: Soudley, Forest of Dean; England
- Coordinates: 51.7919°N 2.4964°W
- Grid reference: SO658104
- Platforms: 1

Other information
- Status: Disused

History
- Original company: Great Western Railway
- Pre-grouping: Great Western Railway
- Post-grouping: Great Western Railway

Key dates
- 3 August 1907: Station opened
- 3 November 1958: Station closed
Location

Upper Soudley Halt railway station is a disused railway station that was opened by the Great Western Railway (GWR) on the former Bullo Pill Railway, later known as the GWR Forest of Dean Branch.

== History ==
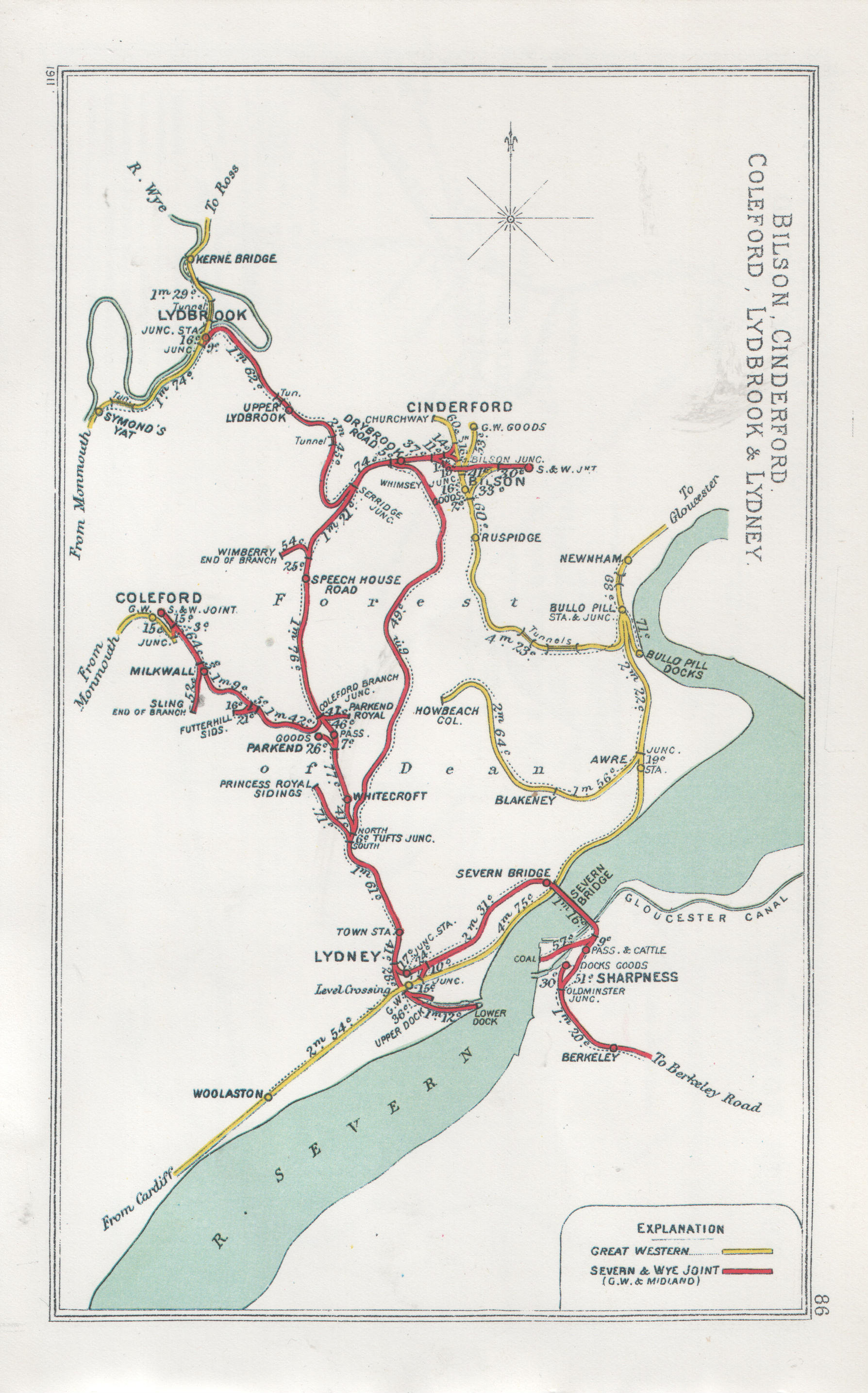
A 1911 RCH map of railways in the vicinity of Upper Soudley Halt.

The station - serving the village of Soudley; was located at 2 miles 16 chains from Newnham and opened when passenger services were introduced on 3 August 1907. From the outset the station (which had been built on a 1 in 66 gradient) was provided with a wooden fronted platform and a GWR Pagoda type hut. This platform was situated on the up (eastern) side of the line, adjacent to the public highway and was rebuilt from its original height of 1 foot 2 inches to the standard height of 3 feet during November 1908 (similar alterations were also made to other platforms on the line).

The platform, as well as being accessible from the public highway, could also be accessed from the former Bullo Pill Tramway (locally known as the Dram Road) which was latterly used as a footpath, but there is no record of a boarded crossing over the track ever being provided at that location. In the later years, crews working down trains (uphill towards Bilson) claimed to have run short on steam and regularly abandoned their trains on the unofficial foot crossing; conveniently located next to the White Horse Public House.

== Services ==
Preceding station	Disused railways	Following station
Bullo Cross Halt; Line and station closed	Great Western Railway; Bullo Pill Railway	Staple Edge Halt; Line and station closed
