= Soudley Ponds =

Ponds in Gloucestershire, England

- Site of Special Scientific Interest
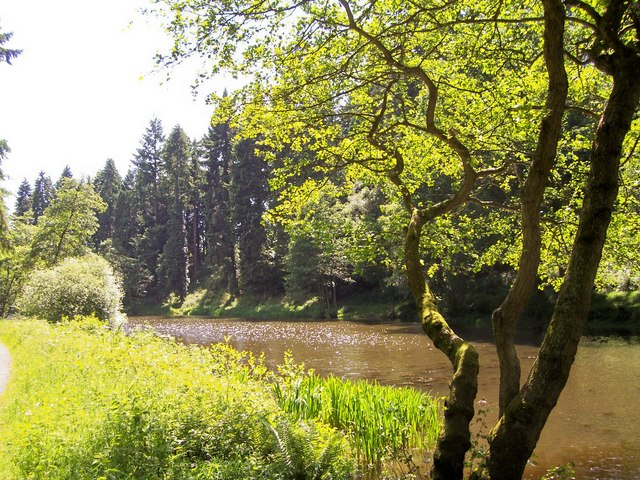
- Soudley Ponds

- Location within Gloucestershire
- Location of Soudley Ponds.
- Area of search: Gloucestershire
- Grid reference: SO662112
- Coordinates: 51.79887°N 2.49082°W
- Interest: Biological
- Area: 7.04 ha (17.4 acres)
- Notification date: 1984

Lying close to the village of Soudley in the Forest of Dean, west Gloucestershire, Soudley Ponds (grid reference SO662112), also known as Sutton Ponds, comprise four linked man-made ponds lined in succession through the narrow Sutton Valley, and surrounded by stands of tall Douglas Fir. It is a 7.04-hectare (17.4-acre) biological Site of Special Scientific Interest notified in 1984.

The site is listed in the 'Forest of Dean Local Plan Review' as a Key Wildlife Site (KWS).

== History ==
The ponds were formerly believed to have been dug in the 18th century to provide water to the furnaces in the Soudley Valley and at the nearby Camp Mill. In fact these would have been fed from the Soudley Brook, and from the Tilting Mill Pool, now in the grounds of the Dean Heritage Centre. It has also been erroneously claimed that they were dug long before this as fish ponds by the monks of the nearby Flaxley Abbey.

However, Atkinson’s map of 1847 shows only a stream running through the valley where the ponds now lie, and it is nowadays assumed that were created as fish ponds after the land’s 1836 purchase by mine-owner William Crawshay. In 1899 the ponds, along with the rest of the Abbotswood Estate, were sold by Robert Crawshay, William’s son, to the Crown, from which point they were leased for fishing to private individuals. It was only in 1906 that the ponds became as they are today, following the work of Arthur Morgan, who had that year acquired the lease of the ponds, and after whom the lowest of the ponds is still locally known as Morgan’s Pool.

== Ownership and usage ==
Now in the care of Forestry England, and declared an SSSI by Natural England, the ponds are one of the Forest of Dean’s most delightful spots, particularly in Spring and in Autumn, and are still used by the anglers of the Soudley Fishing Consortium. All of the land within Soudley Ponds SSSI is owned by the Forestry Commission.

== Publications ==
- The Sutton Ponds, A K Pope, Cindeford, 1986.

== SSSI Source ==
- Natural England SSSI information on the citation
- Natural England SSSI information on the Soudley Pond unit
