= William Riches =

British academic, author, and activist (1939–2024)

- Born: William Terence Martin Riches; 1939; Tintern, Monmouthshire, Wales
- Died: June 2024 (aged 84)
- Education: University of Tennessee
- Occupations: Lecturer in American Studies, Author
- Known for: Anti-Brexit activism
- Notable work: The Civil Rights Movement: Struggle and Resistance
- Spouse: Judith Riches (m. 1963)
- Children: 2

William Terence Martin Riches (1939 – June 2024) was a British academic, author, and activist who was a lecturer in American studies at Ulster University and a political author. In 2017, in opposition to the withdrawal of the United Kingdom from the European Union, Riches declared his home in Gloucestershire an independent nation.

== Early life ==
Riches was born in Tintern, Monmouthshire, Wales, in 1939. He grew up around the Forest of Dean. In 1959, at the age of 20, he met his future wife Judith, whom he married in 1963.

== Career ==
Riches went overseas to pursue a PhD at the University of Tennessee. Riches then moved to Northern Ireland to become a lecturer at Ulster Polytechnic (later Ulster University) in 1973 with his wife and their 2 new children.

In 1992, Riches, along with Arthur Aughey and Greta Jones, published the book The Conservative Political Tradition in Britain and the United States. The book set out to define conservatism as a "single but complex phenomenon", which in a review by Andrew Moravcsik of Harvard University, described the book as "not wholly succeeding the goal". Moravcsik criticized the book for not covering libertarian conservatism, instead focusing elsewhere (among other comments).

In 1997, he published the book The Civil Rights Movement: Struggle and Resistance for students, and it was part of the book series Study in Contemporary History. The book received positive reviews; in the book History: Review of New Books, Michael D. Cary comments that the book "provides an excellent introduction to and review of the U.S. civil rights movement". On the American Studies Resource Centre (a digitised version of the recources at the Liverpool John Moores University), the book is described as presenting a "coherent and very readable account of the American Civil Rights Movement". In the Annual Review of Sociology, published by Aldon D. Morris, the book is described as providing an "analysis of the political and intellectual contributions made by the modern civil rights movement."

== Retirement ==
In 2000, Riches and Judy retired to Newnham-on-Severn, Gloucestershire, close to where he grew up.

In July 2017, Riches gained media attention after declaring his home as an independent republic, naming it the "Independent Republic of Middlewatch". He did this to oppose the exit of the United Kingdom from the European Union, saying that he "cannot see a future for this country now", and that he "doesn't understand why the older generation voted against their children". His wife, Judy, was the president, with himself as the vice president. There were plans to adopt the Euro, and to charge UK visitors to his home £50 for a European visa.

Riches died in June 2024, aged 84.
