= Ruddle Road Halt railway station =

Disused railway station in Gloucestershire, England

Ruddle Road Halt

General information
- Location: Newnham on Severn, Forest of Dean; England
- Coordinates: 51.799381°N 2.455651°W
- Platforms: 1

Other information
- Status: Disused

History
- Original company: Great Western Railway
- Pre-grouping: Great Western Railway

Key dates
- 3 August 1907: Opened
- 29 April 1917: Closed
Location

Ruddle Road Halt railway station was a minor station on the Great Western Railway's, Gloucester-Newport line on the outskirts of Newnham on Severn, Gloucestershire, England. The station was operational for less than ten years, from 3 August 1907 to 29 April 1917, and has since been demolished. The track remains in use on the Gloucester to Newport line. The station was also the start of a branch line to Cinderford New station and Mitcheldean Road station on the Hereford, Ross and Gloucester Railway. The branch to Cinderford closed in 1967 and has since been returned to agriculture and built on.

== Services ==
Preceding station	Disused railways	Following station
Awre for Blakeney; Line and station closed	Great Western Railway; Bullo Pill Railway	Newnham; Line open, station closed
