= Foxes Bridge Bog =

Nature reserve in Gloucestershire, England

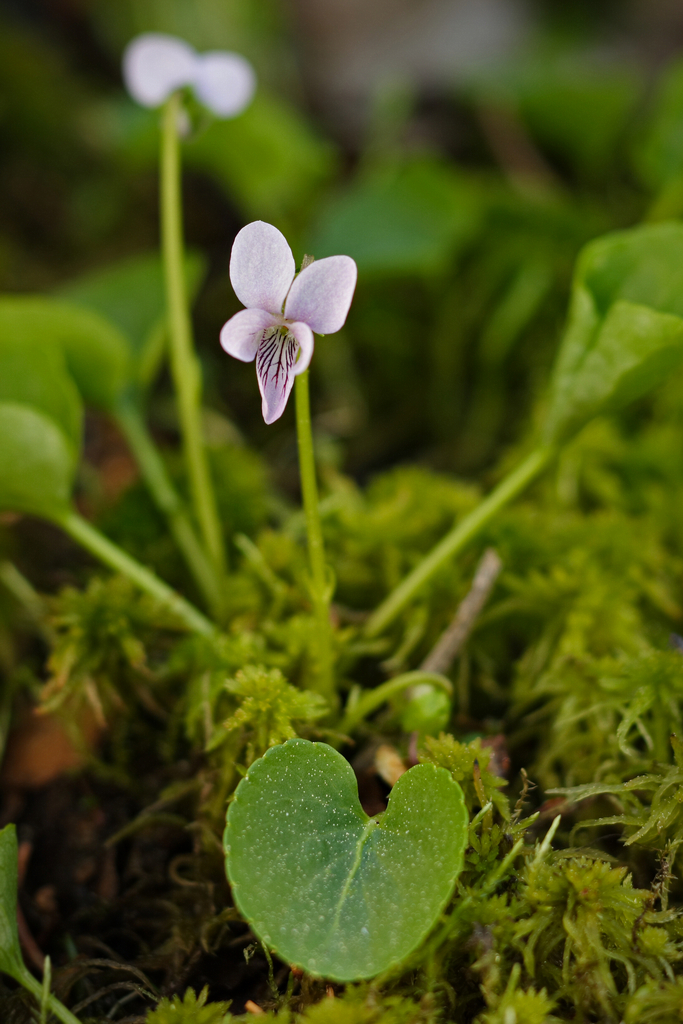
- Example - marsh violet in moss (Viola palustris)

- Location within Gloucestershire
- Type: Gloucestershire Wildlife Trust nature reserve
- Location: Forest of Dean, near Speech House
- Coordinates: 51°48′37.28″N 2°32′14.5″W
- Area: 13 acres (5.3 ha)
- Created: 1977
- Operator: Gloucestershire Wildlife Trust Forestry Commission
- Status: Open all year

Foxes Bridge Bog (grid reference SO630125) is a 5.3-hectare (13-acre) nature reserve in Gloucestershire. The site is owned by the Forestry Commission and is managed by the Gloucestershire Wildlife Trust in partnership with the Forestry Commission. The site is listed in the 'Forest of Dean Local Plan Review' as a Key Wildlife Site (KWS).

== Location and habitat ==
The bog lies in the heart of the Forest of Dean, and is separated from the Woorgreens Lake and Marsh nature reserve by the B4226. The site has been a nature reserve since 1977, and represents the remains of an ancient acid bog which historically covered this area. This is one of the rarest habitats in the county. It is in the Coal Measures (in a depression), is on alluvium and fed by a stream from the north. The water levels are controlled by sluice, and are linked to the Woorgreens Lake and Marsh reserve.

The reserve is a significant example of a sphagnum bog and also supports a wide range of lichens. These grow on the trees and exposed rocks. This is a sheltered site though open in aspect.

== History ==
The oak woodland which surrounds the bog was planted c. 1860. There were two attempts to sink two mining pits in the 1830s and to construct an embankment to the west. This did not come to fruition and was part of a plan to construct a railway which also failed. There was a threat in 1978 from a proposed Woorgreens open-cast mine proposal which was averted. This would have affected the water supply. The outcome was the control system now operating for the water levels between the two reserves. There is a drainage channel running through the centre of Foxes Bridge Bog.

== Flora ==
There is a diverse range of bog and marshland plants recorded. These include marsh St John's-wort which is the only known occurrence in Gloucestershire. Species such as marsh violet, slender tufted-sedge, common cotton-grass and marsh pennywort flourish. Other species such as lesser spearwort, cuckooflower and ragged robin are present.

Historical recordings for the site include bog pimpernel and two types of sundew.

There are old silver birch, alder and willow towards the south of the bog.

== Invertebrates ==
The presence of marsh violets makes the bog an ideal supportive habitat for the uncommon small pearl-bordered fritillary. Dragonflies are in abundance similar to the adjacent Woorgreens Lake and Marsh reserve. Records include broad-bodied chaser and the large red damselfly.

== Fauna ==
Fallow deer are known to use the site and the area is grazed by the forest sheep.

== Conservation ==
This is an area which is managed to control encroaching species to conserve and to increase the bog flora.

== Walks ==
There are two publications which detail walks, and places to visit, for recreation, and for observing particular wildlife in this part of the Forest of Dean. These are Where to see Wildlife in the Forest of Dean and Heart of the Forest Wildlife Walk.

== Publications ==
- Kelham, A, Sanderson, J, Doe, J, Edgeley-Smith, M, et al., 1979, 1990, 2002 editions, 'Nature Reserves of the Gloucestershire Trust for Nature Conservation/Gloucestershire Wildlife Trust'
- 'Woorgreens Nature Reserve', (undated), Gloucestershire Wildlife Trust and Forestry Commission joint publication
- 'Where to see Wildlife in the Forest of Dean', January 2012, Gloucestershire Wildlife Trust
- 'Heart of the Forest Wildlife Walk', March 2012, Gloucestershire Wildlife Trust
