= Ruspidge Halt railway station =

Former railway station in England

Ruspidge Halt
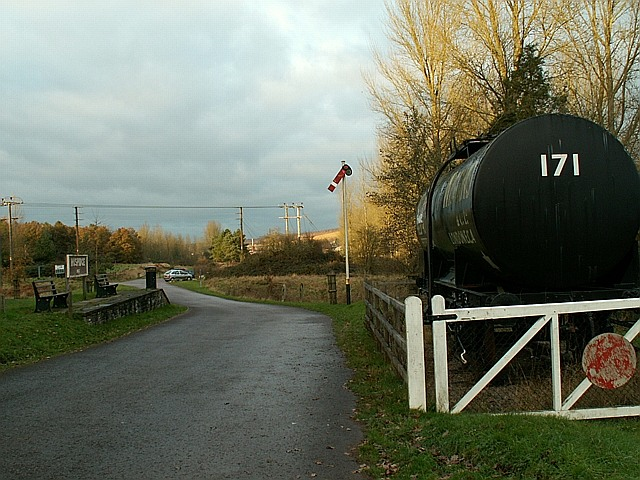
- Site of the former station (now a linear park) in 2005.

General information
- Location: Ruspidge, Forest of Dean; England
- Coordinates: 51.8115°N 2.5094°W
- Grid reference: SO649126
- Platforms: 1

Other information
- Status: Disused

History
- Original company: Great Western Railway
- Pre-grouping: Great Western Railway
- Post-grouping: Great Western Railway

Key dates
- 3 August 1907: Station opened
- 3 November 1958: Station closed
Location

Ruspidge Halt railway station is a disused railway station opened by the Great Western Railway (GWR) on the former Bullo Pill Railway, later known as the GWR Forest of Dean Branch.

== History ==
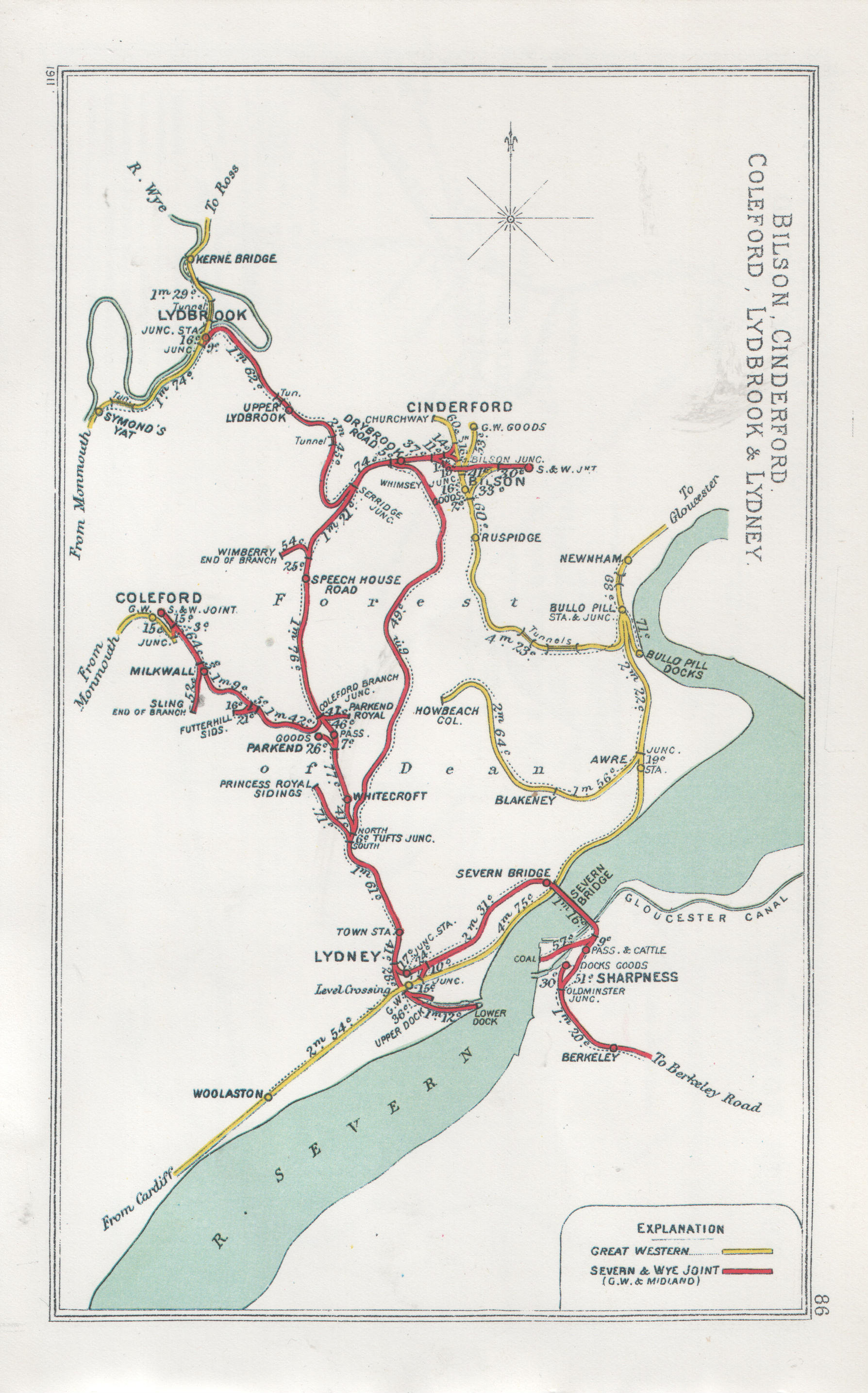
A 1911 RCH map of railways in the vicinity of Ruspidge Halt

The Halt was located about 4 miles 4 chains (6.5 km) from Newnham on a 1 in 201 gradient.

The station opened for passenger services in August 1907. The low platform was constructed from stone and a stone building was provided from the outset.

Before the commencement of passenger services, the Forest of Dean Branch was worked by train staff in two sections - Bullo to Ruspidge and Ruspidge to Bilson. In order for the passenger services to be introduced, the former goods office was converted for use as a booking office (it had both the railway and public telephones).

The train staff working was also replaced by single line electric key token working and at this time a three-lever ground frame gave the porter control of the up and down distant signals and the gate bolts (which were interlocked).

== Services ==
Preceding station	Disused railways	Following station
Staple Edge Halt; Line and station closed	Great Western Railway; Bullo Pill Railway	Bilson Halt; Line and station closed
