= Westbury-on-Severn =

Village in Gloucestershire, England

Coordinates: 51.8244°N 2.4124°W

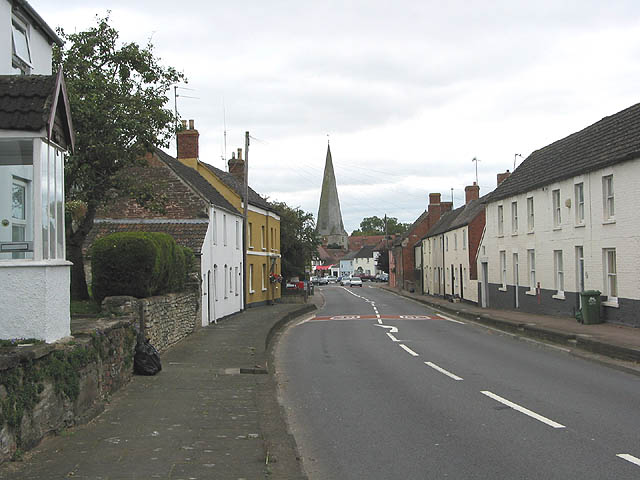

- Location within Gloucestershire
- Population: 1,792 (2011)
- OS grid reference: SO716140
- Civil parish: Westbury-on-Severn
- District: Forest of Dean
- Shire county: Gloucestershire
- Region: South West
- Country: England
- Sovereign state: United Kingdom
- Post town: Westbury-on-Severn
- Postcode district: GL14
- Police: Gloucestershire
- Fire: Gloucestershire
- Ambulance: South Western
- UK Parliament: Forest of Dean

Westbury-on-Severn is a rural village in England that is the centre of the large, rural parish, also called Westbury-on-Severn.

== Location ==
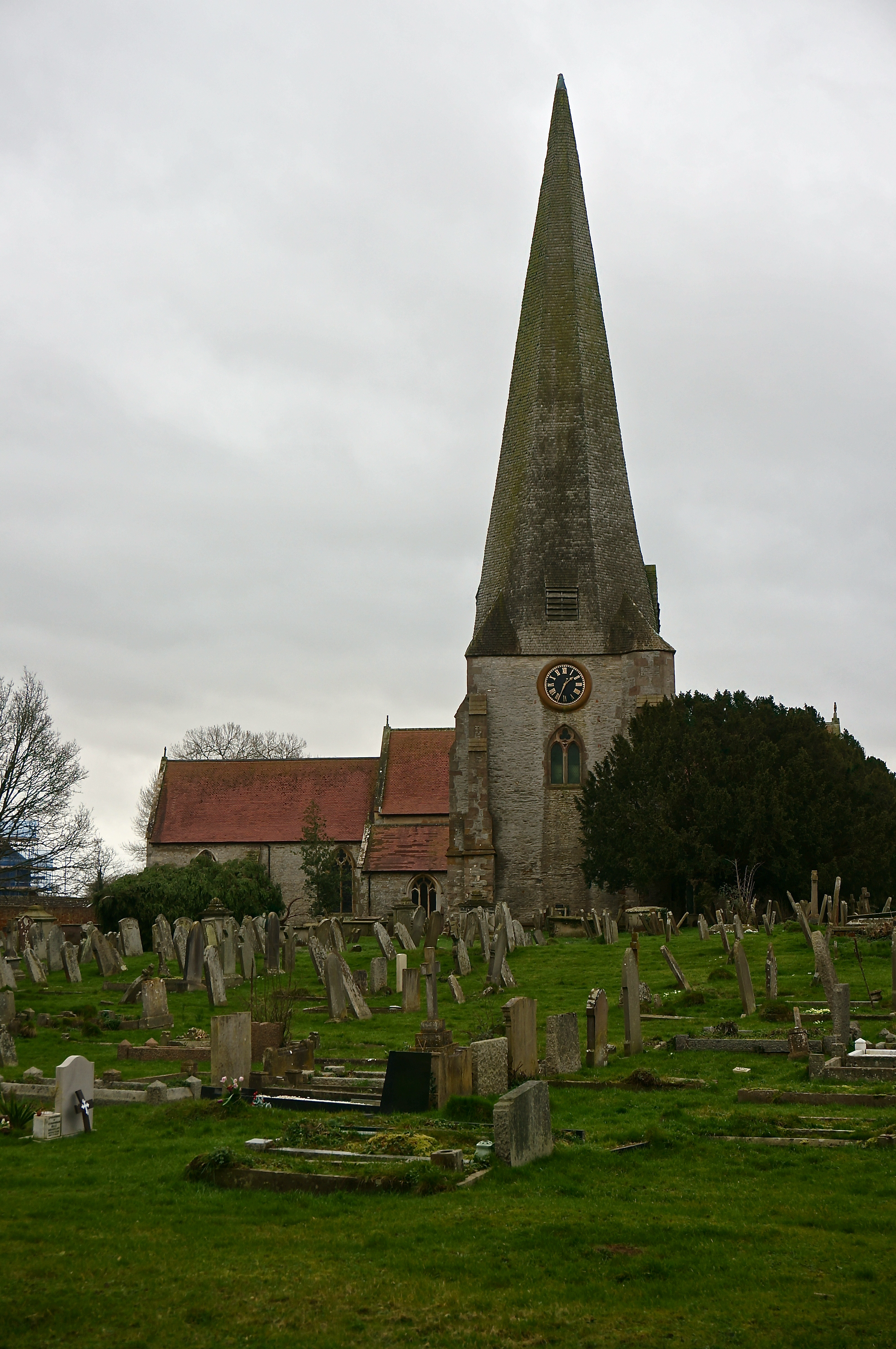
Tower, Spire and Church of St Peter and St Paul, Westbury-on-Severn

The village is situated on the A48 road (between Minsterworth and Newnham on Severn) and bounded by the River Severn to the south and west. Westbury is also bounded to the West by the Newport to Gloucester railway line, although Westbury does not have a railway station (the Westbury-on-Severn Halt closed in 1959, the closest stations being Gloucester and Lydney.

Westbury is just over a mile long and has one only housing estate to the south of the main A48 road which was constructed in the 1980s. The village also has a primary school, a pub "The Lyon" (formerly the Red Lion) and dentist surgery. The post office cum village store closed permanently in 2019

Geoff Sterry, a coal and solid fuel merchant, was also based in the village, but has since closed and the yard is now site of several residential dwellings.

Westbury falls within the District of the Forest of Dean although the forest itself does not extend to the village.

The village has a large parish church, which is distinctive, as the steeple is not attached to the main building because of a fire which burned down the old wooden building soon after the new steeple was completed. Within the porch of the church are several markings of crosses and full crosses made during the English Civil War. The north porch and north aisle are the oldest parts of the church, having been built around 1290.

Just to the East of the village centre is the National Trust owned Westbury Court Garden.

== Transport Links ==
The village is served by three regular bus services, operated by Stagecoach: the 22 service between Coleford in the Forest of Dean and Gloucester and by the 23 service between Lydney and Gloucester.

== Notable people ==
See Category:People from Westbury-on-Severn

== See also ==
- Westbury Court Garden
