= Valerie Grosvenor Myer =

British writer, university teacher, and editor

Valerie Winifred Grosvenor Myer
- Born: Valerie Winifred Grosvenor Godwin; 13 April 1935; Soudley, Gloucestershire, England
- Died: 9 August 2007 (aged 72); Haddenham, Cambridgeshire, England
- Occupations: Journalist; teacher; novelist; biographer; critic; encyclopedist
- Spouse: Michael Myer

Valerie Winifred Grosvenor Myer (13 April 1935 – 9 August 2007) was a British writer, university teacher, and editor.

== Early life ==
Valerie Winifred Grosvenor Godwin was born in Lower Soudley in the Forest of Dean, Gloucestershire, England, to Donald Godwin, who worked in insurance and as a smallholder, having started work aged 14 looking after pit-ponies in coalmines, and "educated and ambitious" Margaret (née Jones). She was raised in "tranquil poverty"; the village had no electricity or indoor sanitation until she was in her late teens. Her parents were second cousins, and there was an "alluring legend" that the family descended from nobility via a bastard child several generations ago. She studied at East Dean Grammar School in Cinderford, but had to leave at the age of 16 to train as a librarian in Gloucester; a "crisis in family finances" meant she was unable to go on to the university education her mother had led her to hope for.

== Reporter ==
She began writing freelance reports for the Forest of Dean Mercury before being taken on as a reporter, and moved in 1958 to the Dartford Chronicle in Kent. She then worked for two Fleet Street women's magazines, Housewife (sub-editor) and Flair (Chief sub-editor). After marrying Michael Myer (who later took the "Grosvenor" part of his wife's name - becoming Michael Grosvenor Myer - to distinguish himself from other similarly-named men) in 1959, she attended a course at the City Literary Institute.

== Cambridge education ==
On the advice of her lecturer, she entered for and won a Mature State Scholarship with an extended essay on one of Jane Austen's juvenilia, "Catherine, or the Bower", and its relationship to her mature work, and went up to Newnham College, Cambridge in 1963 to read English, graduating at the age of 31 with a first class degree. During her time at Cambridge, she wrote theatre criticism for The Guardian.

== Later career ==
Her post-graduate career was in editing, university teaching, and writing. Having studied for a Postgraduate Certificate in Education at Hughes Hall, Cambridge, she taught briefly at secondary school level; but finding this uncongenial, she appropriately combined her two areas of experience in educational journalism: Deputy Arts Editor of The Times Educational Supplement before moving to The Teacher (weekly newspaper of the National Union of Teachers) as Literary and Features Editor. She remained living in Cambridge, commuting by train to these London jobs, whilst also supervising undergraduates, having been included on the English Faculty list of Approved Supervisors, for Cambridge colleges Queens', Homerton and Robinson, and was elected to an Associateship at Lucy Cavendish College. Notable among her supervisees were Richard Maher at Queens', Jan Ravens at Homerton, Andy White and Morwenna Banks at Robinson. On the invitation of Professor Wu Ningkun, who was a visiting fellow at Cambridge, she taught at the Beijing Language Institute, later the Beijing Language and Culture University, and in 1989 worked there close to the Tiananmen Square protests, visiting her students in the square just the day before the demonstration was brought violently to an end by the People's Liberation Army, after which she had to flee at risk of gunfire before her year's contract was complete: she spent a night at the Beijing Toronto Hotel on her way to the airport, and there were actually bullet-holes in its walls next morning. She also taught at Fourah Bay College, (University of Freetown), Sierra Leone, where she was caught up in the civil war in 1991. "These episodes suggested that Valerie's life was becoming more adventurous and dangerous as she neared retirement age," wrote Sue Limb in her obituary in The Guardian.

== Academic work and novels ==
As well as the Cambridge University supervisions and the university teaching in Beijing and Freetown noted above, she lectured at various times in the USA (School of the Art Institute of Chicago), Canada (University of New Brunswick at St John), France (University of Bourges), and Sweden (Lund University), and for the Cambridge Folklore Group, the Cambridge Jane Austen Society, the University of the Third Age, and several Cambridge-based international Summer Schools. Her writings included a study of Margaret Drabble, Puritanism and Permissiveness in 1974, biographies of Jane Austen, Harriette Wilson and Mary Kingsley, critical studies of Charlotte Brontë, Samuel Richardson and Laurence Sterne. Poems appeared in Peepshow, New Poetry (ed Norman Hidden), The Interpreter's House (ed Merryn Williams), Chelmer Festival Anthology, &c. She also wrote novels: Culture Shock (Duckworth 1988), and The Butterfly House (Fern House {Rodney Dale} 1998) which drew on her experience in China. She collaborated with Beijing colleague Professor Li Yanshu in a standard comprehension textbook for Chinese students of English. Her study of Ten Great English Novelists was published simultaneously by Vision Press, London & St. Martin's Press, New York (1990). She contributed short stories to Arts Council UK anthologies edited by Margaret Drabble and Angus Wilson, and literary articles to The Oxford Companion to English Literature, The Cambridge Guide to Literature in English (ed Ian Ousby), The Continuum Encyclopedia of American Literature. She was for many years Cambridge theatre critic for The Stage. Her final work was to co-edit with Steven R. Serafin the Continuum Encyclopedia of British Literature (2003), an ambitious work published in New York aimed at American students. She was also a keen and accomplished black-&-white photographer, having a darkroom built into her Cambridgeshire home, holding several exhibitions in Cambridge, and contributing publicity and record-sleeve photographs to her friends, the folksingers Nic Jones, Peter Bellamy, and Anthea Bellamy-Birch.

== Illness and death ==
After she was diagnosed with Parkinson's disease in the 1990s, she told her husband Michael that she would commit suicide when she judged the degeneration caused by the illness to have become intolerable, but before she lost the necessary physical ability, and did so in 2007.
