= Ellwood, Gloucestershire =

Hamlet in Gloucestershire, England

Coordinates: 51.7708°N 2.5931°W

Ellwood
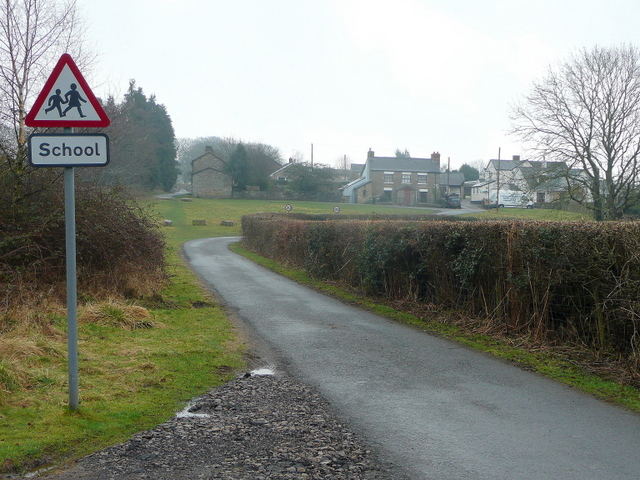

- Location within Gloucestershire
- OS grid reference: SO592082
- District: Forest of Dean
- Shire county: Gloucestershire
- Region: South West
- Country: England
- Sovereign state: United Kingdom
- Police: Gloucestershire
- Fire: Gloucestershire
- Ambulance: South Western
- UK Parliament: Forest of Dean

Ellwood is a hamlet in the Forest of Dean district in Gloucestershire, England. It lies around 3 kilometres (1.9 mi) south-east of Coleford. The hamlet has a football club Ellwood F.C. who play at Bromley Road.
