= Forest of Dean English =

English dialect

- Vorest
- Native to: United Kingdom
- Region: Forest of Dean
- Ethnicity: Foresters
- Language family: Indo-European: Germanic; West Germanic; Ingvaeonic; Anglo-Frisian; Anglic; Old West Saxon; West Country English; Forest of Dean English
- Early forms: Old English: West Saxon Old English; Middle English; Early Modern English
- Writing system: Latin (English alphabet); English Braille, Unified English Braille

Language codes
- ISO 639-3: None (mis)

Forest of Dean English, also known as Vorest (/vɒrɛst/), Vurust or Varest within the dialect itself, is a dialect of English spoken in the Forest of Dean, Gloucestershire, in the West Country of England. The dialect is distinctive for its notable way of speaking, such as: a continued use of 'thee' and 'thou' and a lyrical manner of speech, reminiscent of iambic pentameter. The dialect is in danger of assimilation into West Country English, or outright extinction, due to discrimination against speakers, mass media and social media. Vorest receives no formal recognition from the UK Government or any other authority. It has no written standard form, nor is it formally taught in schools.
