= Westbury-on-Severn Halt railway station =

Disused railway station in Westbury-on-Severn, Gloucestershire

Westbury-on-Severn Halt

General information
- Location: Westbury-on-Severn, Gloucestershire; England
- Coordinates: 51.828°N 2.4203°W
- Grid reference: SO711144

Other information
- Status: Disused

History
- Original company: Great Western Railway

Key dates
- 9 July 1928: Opened
- 10 August 1959: Closed
Location

Westbury-on-Severn Halt railway station served the village of Westbury-on-Severn, Gloucestershire, England, from 1928 to 1959 on the South Wales Railway.

== History ==
The station was opened on 9 July 1928 by the Great Western Railway. It closed on 10 August 1959.

Preceding station	Historical railways	Following station
Grange Court; Line open, station closed	Great Western Railway; South Wales Railway	Newnham; Line open, station closed
