= Ellwood F.C. =

Association football club in England

Ellwood
- Full name: Ellwood Football Club
- Founded: 1907
- Ground: Bromley Road
- League: North Gloucestershire League Premier Division
- 2025–26: North Gloucestershire League Premier Division, 12th of 12
Home colours

Ellwood F.C. is a football club based in Ellwood, Gloucestershire, England. They played in the FA Vase during the 1980s. They are currently members of the North Gloucestershire League Premier Division.

== History ==
The club was formed in 1907. The club played in local leagues, such as the Forest of Dean Football league until the 1984–85 season when they joined the Gloucestershire County Football League. The 1989–90 season saw the club win the league, a season after entering the FA Vase for the first time.

The club stayed in the Gloucestershire County League until the end of the 2015–16 season, when the club decided to withdraw from the league due to a failure to attract players and Coaches suitable for County level football. The club moved to the North Gloucestershire Association Football League, winning the Premier Division in the 2017–18 season, winning promotion to the Gloucestershire Northern Senior League. The club did not even last a season in the Northern Senior league, pulling out in September. The club for the 2019–20 season rejoined the North Gloucestershire League in Division one.

== Ground ==
The club plays their home games at the Bromley Road ground.

== Honours ==
- Gloucestershire County Football League
  - Champions (1) 1989–90
- North Gloucestershire Association Football League
  - Champions (1) 2017–18
