= Gorsty Knoll =

Hamlet in Gloucestershire, England

Coordinates: 51.780825°N 2.598567°W

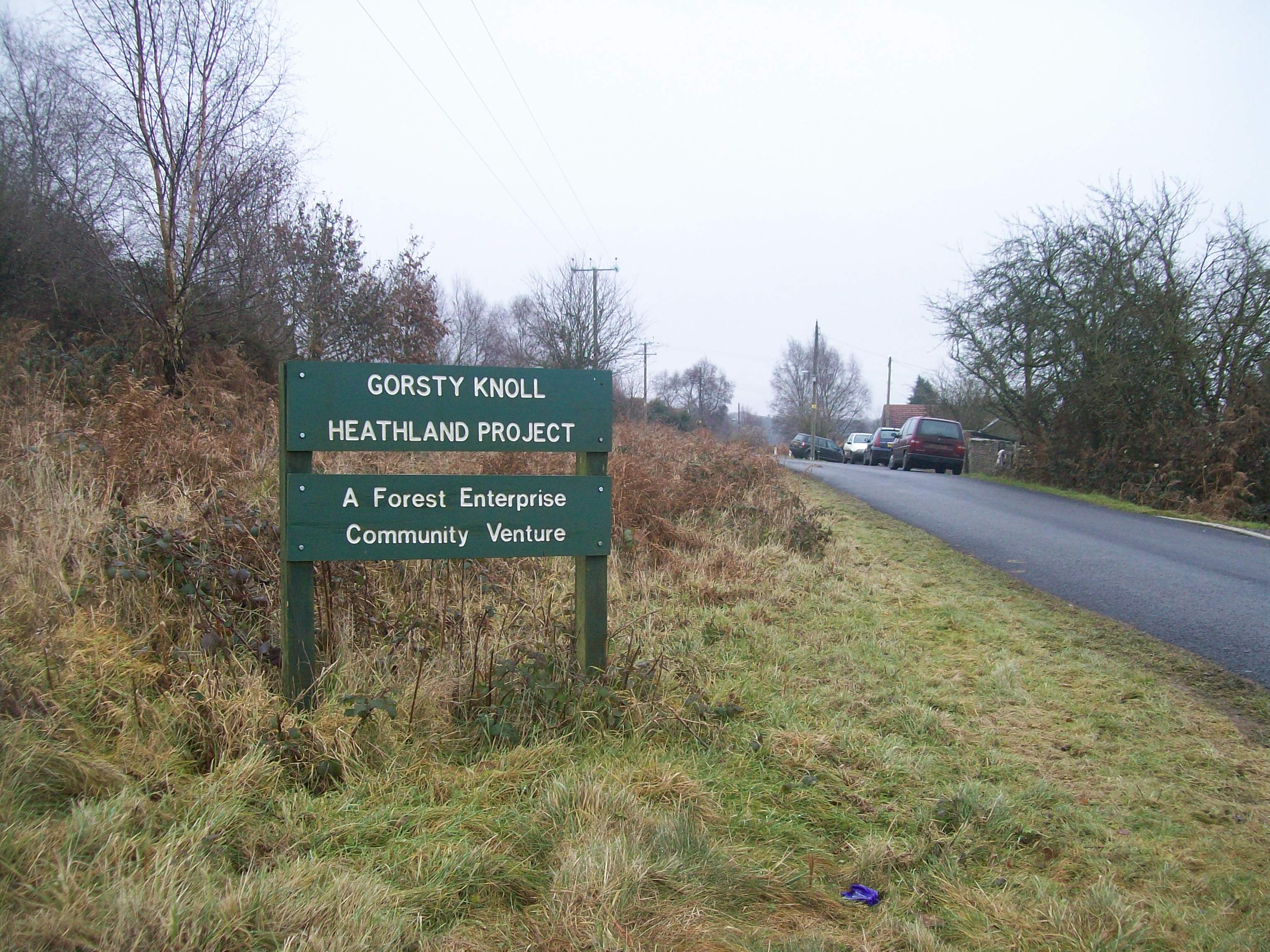

- Location within Gloucestershire
- OS grid reference: SO587092
- District: Forest of Dean
- Shire county: Gloucestershire
- Region: South West
- Country: England
- Sovereign state: United Kingdom
- Post town: Coleford
- Postcode district: GL16
- Police: Gloucestershire
- Fire: Gloucestershire
- Ambulance: South Western
- UK Parliament: Forest of Dean

Gorsty Knoll is a small hamlet, located in the Forest of Dean, Gloucestershire, England. The internationally important remains of Darkhill Ironworks and the Titanic Steelworks, are located on the edge of the hamlet. Gorsty Knoll is also famed for its glow worms.
