= Ruspidge =

Village in Gloucestershire, England

Coordinates: 51.8054°N 2.5052°W

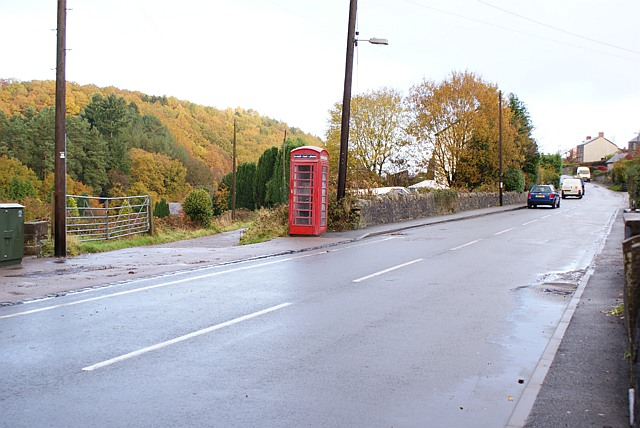

- Location within Gloucestershire
- Population: 2,472 (2011)
- OS grid reference: SO652119
- Civil parish: Ruspidge and Soudley
- District: Forest of Dean
- Shire county: Gloucestershire
- Region: South West
- Country: England
- Sovereign state: United Kingdom
- Post town: Cinderford
- Postcode district: GL14
- Police: Gloucestershire
- Fire: Gloucestershire
- Ambulance: South Western
- UK Parliament: Forest of Dean

Ruspidge is a village in the civil parish of Ruspidge and Soudley, in the Forest of Dean district of west Gloucestershire, England. The civil parish includes Soudley

It is located near the town of Cinderford and in the Forest of Dean. There is one public house called the New Inn.

There is one village shop on the main street (Ruspidge Road), a park and football pitch, as well as a chapel, lying on Railway Road. It is named such because the Ruspidge Halt railway station was situated at the end before its closure in 1958.

Its grid reference is SO 655 125 GB.
