= Blaize Bailey =

Hamlet in Gloucestershire, England

Coordinates: 51.804726°N 2.479641°W

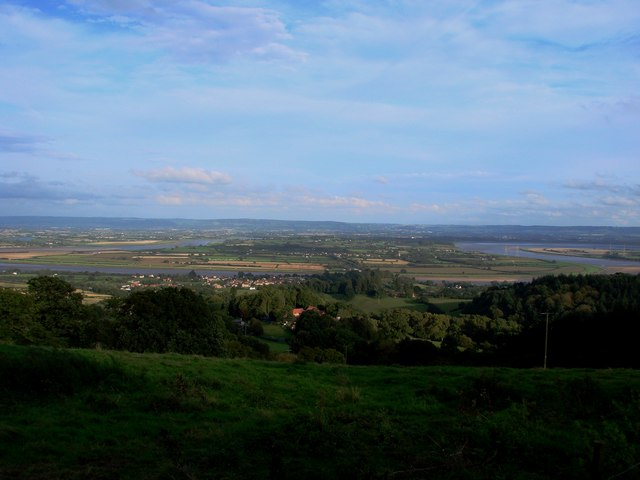
- View from Blaize Bailey, looking towards Arlingham

- Location within Gloucestershire
- OS grid reference: SO670119
- District: Forest of Dean
- Shire county: Gloucestershire
- Region: South West
- Country: England
- Sovereign state: United Kingdom
- Police: Gloucestershire
- Fire: Gloucestershire
- Ambulance: South Western

Blaize Bailey is a small hamlet and viewpoint on the eastern edge of the Forest of Dean, in Gloucestershire, England.

The viewpoint was constructed using stone from a disused railway bridge at nearby Fetter Hill. It overlooks a horseshoe bend in the River Severn and, on a fine day, it is possible to see Gloucester Cathedral, Newnham on Severn and the Cotswold Hills.
