= Woorgreens Lake and Marsh =

Nature reserve in Gloucestershire, England

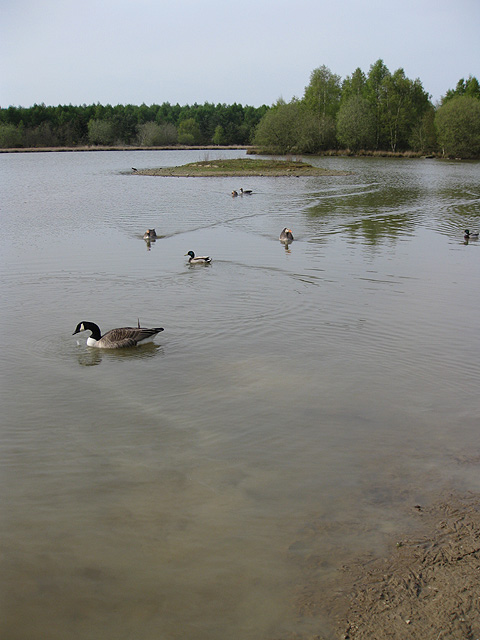
- Waterfowl at Woorgreens Lake and Marsh

- Location within Gloucestershire
- Type: Gloucestershire Wildlife Trust nature reserve
- Location: Forest of Dean, near Speech House
- Coordinates: 51°48′43.75″N 2°32′14.57″W
- Area: 22.3 acres (9.0 ha)
- Created: 1984
- Operator: Gloucestershire Wildlife Trust Forestry Commission
- Status: Open all year

Woorgreens Lake and Marsh (grid reference SO630127) is a 9-hectare (22-acre) nature reserve in Gloucestershire.

The site is owned by the Forestry Commission and is managed by the Gloucestershire Wildlife Trust in partnership with the Forestry Commission. The site is listed in the 'Forest of Dean Local Plan Review' as a Key Wildlife Site (KWS).

== Location and habitat ==
The nature reserve lies in the heart of the Forest of Dean, on the B4226 between Cinderford and Coleford and east of Cannop. It is about half a mile to the east of Speech House. This has been a nature reserve managed by the Trust since 1984. It consists of reclaimed land from open-cast mine workings and has lake, marsh and open heath habitats. Mining ceased in 1981, and the area has been swiftly colonised by a significant variety of plants and animals. There is a main lake which is surrounded by tree plantations. These consist mainly of Oak, Alder, Larch and Corsican Pine. Areas to be kept open were identified and this planning has ensured the creation of large areas of open heathland habitat.

The water on the site is controlled by a sluice and is linked with that of Foxes Bridge Bog, which is also a Gloucestershire Wildlife Trust nature reserve. The Bog is on the opposite side of the B4226. Nearby (to the west) is another Trust reserve which is Cannop Bridge Marsh at Cannop Ponds.

Crabtree Hill is to the north of the lake. In particular, ten hectares of conifers were cleared from this hill by the Forestry Commission in 2011, thus creating a large open area which over time will fully colonise as heathland habitat. This will complement that already created and part of the reserve.

== Flora and fauna ==
=== Birds ===
The water area encourages wading birds such as spotted redshank, greenshank, green sandpiper and curlew. Snipe are recorded as over-wintering. Breeding birds include little grebe, moorhen, mallard, Eurasian teal and tufted duck. The heathland area encourages whinchat, skylark, tree pipit, cuckoo, nightjar, kestrel and sparrowhawk. The reserve is one of three known sites in the Forest of Dean where stonechat breed. Swift, swallow and house martin are regular feeders as the site is rich in insect life.

Siskin, lesser redpoll and crossbills are recorded on the woodland edge of the reserve. Hobbies are recorded chasing dragonflies over the lake.

The Royal Society for the Protection of Birds (RSPB) reports on the birdlife of Woorgreens Lake and Crabtree Hill.

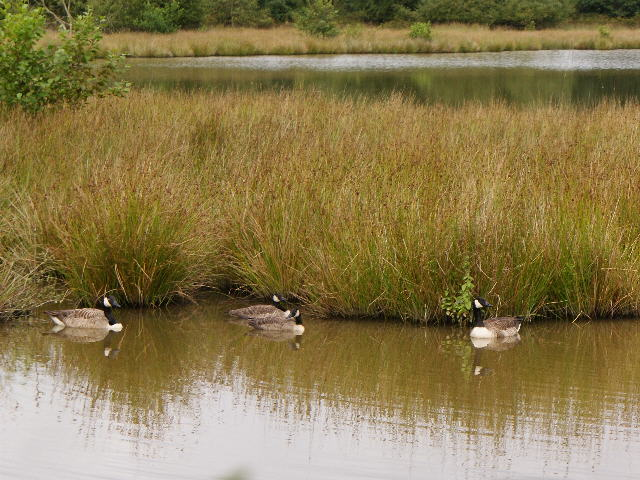
Canada geese at Woorgreens Lake

=== Invertebrates ===
A wide range of butterflies are recorded which include small skipper, common blue, and there are local rarities such as grayling and brown argus reported. The Woorgreens reserve is considered to be the Forest of Dean's best dragonfly site, and over seventeen species have been recorded. Some of the species are scarce and breeding colonies in this area are important. They are supported by the network of other ponds and ditches in the area, such as Kensley pond. Breeding populations recorded include blue-tailed damselfly, large red damselfly, azure damselfly, southern hawker, ruddy darter, broad-bodied chaser and the emperor dragonfly.

=== Amphibians and reptiles ===
The rare and protected great crested newt is present in the lake.

Common lizard, slowworm, grass snake and adder are encouraged by the heathland habitat. This is threatened habitat and once covered large areas of the Forest of Dean.

=== Flora and fungi ===
Rushes flourish along the margins, and a variety of herbs and grasses in the rides. Bell heather has established itself in the heath area, along with ling and common gorse.

The dead branches of gorse encourage fungi such as witches' butter. Bay boletes may be found beneath the pine trees.

== Conservation ==
This is a site which nature has colonised, but needs management to control domination by particular species. There is a wader scrape and ditches have been made deeper. There has been planting of willow and alder.

== Walks ==
There are two publications which detail walks, and places to visit, for recreation, and for observing particular wildlife in this part of the Forest of Dean. These are Where to see Wildlife in the Forest of Dean and Heart of the Forest Wildlife Walk.

== Publications ==
- Kelham, A, Sanderson, J, Doe, J, Edgeley-Smith, M, et al., 1979, 1990, 2002 editions, 'Nature Reserves of the Gloucestershire Trust for Nature Conservation/Gloucestershire Wildlife Trust'
- 'Woorgreens Nature Reserve', (undated), Gloucestershire Wildlife Trust and Forestry Commission joint publication
- ‘Nature Reserve Guide – discover the wild Gloucestershire on your doorstep’ - 50th Anniversary, January 2011, Gloucestershire Wildlife Trust
- 'Where to see Wildlife in the Forest of Dean', January 2012, Gloucestershire Wildlife Trust
- 'Heart of the Forest Wildlife Walk', March 2012, Gloucestershire Wildlife Trust
