= Dean Heritage Centre =

Industrial heritage centre

Coordinates: 51°47′35.5″N 2°29′18.5″W

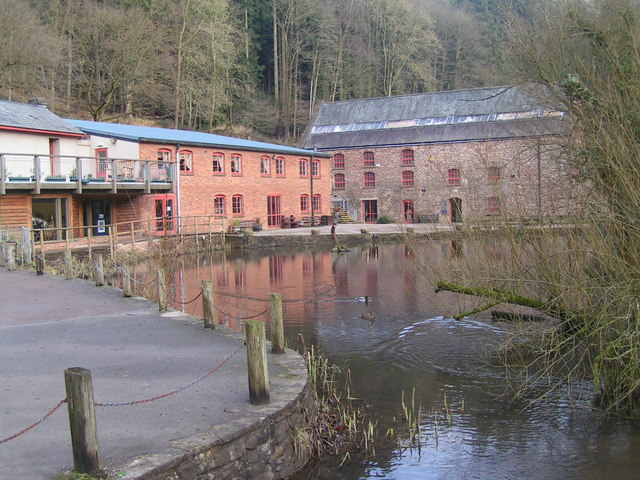
Dean Heritage Centre

The Dean Heritage Centre is located in the valley of Soudley, Gloucestershire, England in the Forest of Dean and exists to record and preserve the social and industrial history of the area and its people. The centre comprises the museum itself, a millpond and waterwheel, forester's cottage with garden and animals, art and craft exhibitions and workshops, and trails around the surrounding woodland. In addition, there are picnic tables, barbecue hearths, an adventure playground, a gift shop selling local produce and the Heritage Kitchen, a restaurant providing home-made food.

== The museum ==
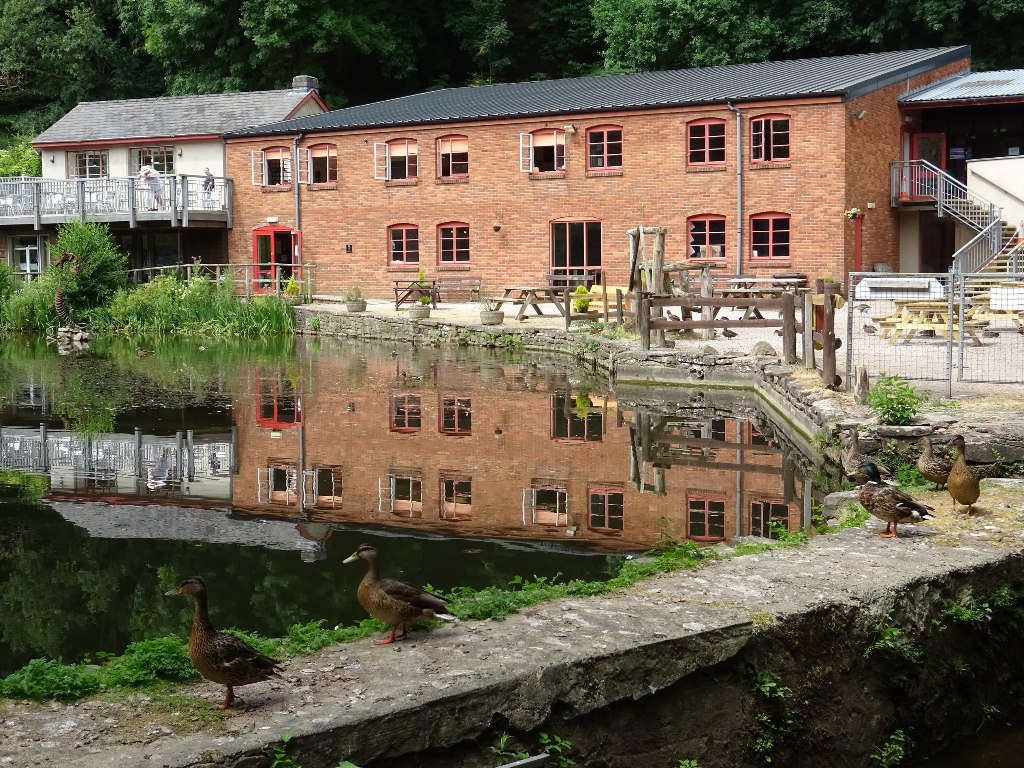
The museum

The museum itself comprises five galleries telling the history of the Forest of Dean from the earliest geological and fossil records to the present day. They display a wide variety of artefacts from industries such as coal and iron mining, forestry, timber, stone working and clock making that have shaped the history, landscape and culture of the Forest. Among the more noteworthy artefacts in the museum's collection are an 1830s Lightmoor Colliery beam engine, Thomas Sopwith's 1838 geological model of the Dean Forest, and the Voyce collection of eighteenth and nineteenth century longcase clocks.

The Dean Heritage Museum Trust is a registered charity formed in 1979 in response to public concern that the heritage of the Forest of Dean was disappearing. The trust bought a former corn mill Camp Mill and opened a museum there in 1983. The museum underwent a major refurbishment paid for by the Heritage Lottery Fund and completed in 2003.

=== Setting ===
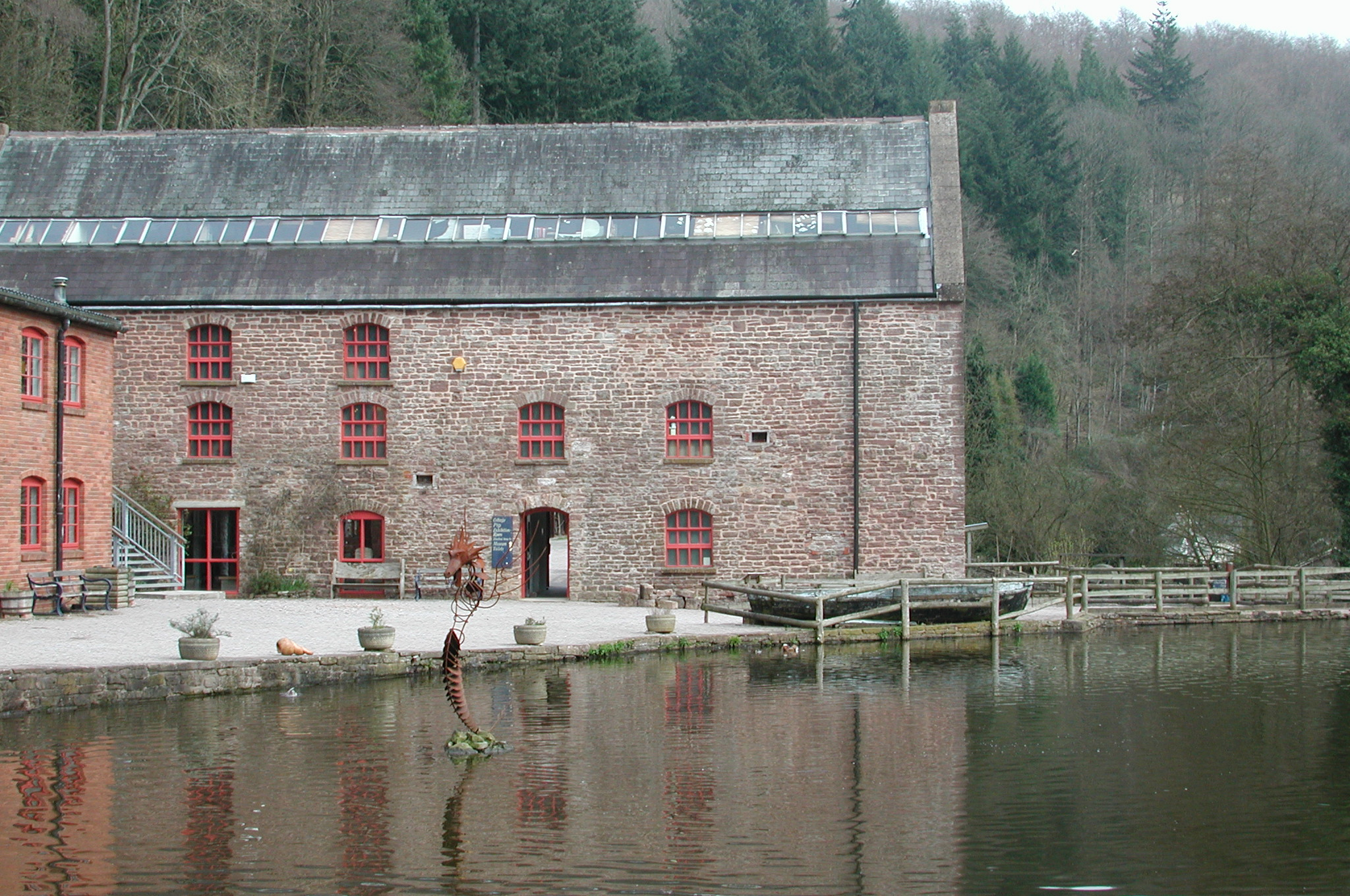
The millpond

The museum has a millpond, water from which drives the restored waterwheel. The pond is fed by a stream running from Morgan's Pool, the lowest of the Soudley Ponds, and is home to colonies of mallard and mandarin ducks. Other bird species that can be seen include dippers, kingfishers, grey wagtails and grey herons. Starting from the museum, a forestry trail can be followed through centuries-old oak and beech woods up to the summit of Bradley Hill, where a panoramic view of the valley can be seen; including the 1846 Zion Chapel and the old railway tunnel, excavated in 1894 and which runs beneath the hillside.

=== Foresters' cottage and garden ===
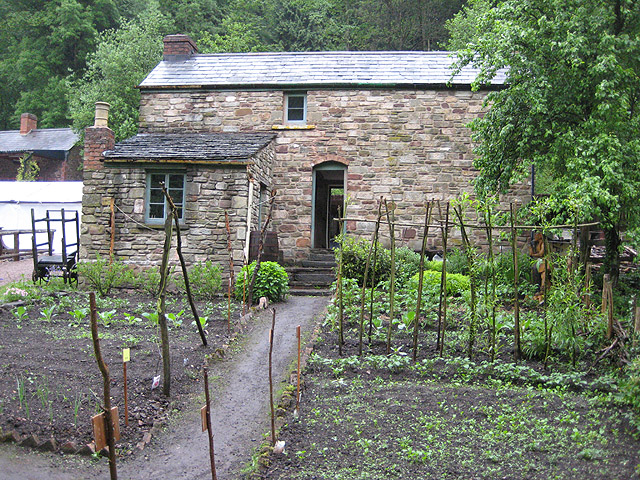
Cottage and garden

The museum grounds are home to a reconstructed early-twentieth century Forester's cottage, which was moved stone by stone from its original location. The cottage is furnished and decorated in authentic Victorian and Edwardian period style. Like many Forest cottages of the time, it is a two-up, two-down, with, on the ground floor, a well-appointed sitting room with a harmonium, Victorian chaise-longue and a collection of period china, and a kitchen with an authentic cast-iron range.

Upstairs there can be found two bedrooms, a children's room, and a master bedroom which also contains a cot. The bedrooms do not have wardrobes, but, as houses of the period would, instead contain chests to store clothing. Outside there is a wash-house containing a copper for washing clothes, along with a washing dolly and mangle.

Behind the house lies the garden. It is planted with vegetables of authentic period varieties.

=== Charcoal burners’ camp ===
Also on the site is the charcoal burners’ camp, sited in a forest clearing with a stone-and-turf-built hut constructed as they have been for centuries. Whole families would have camped in the Forest for months at a time during the summer in order to provide the constant supervision necessary to keep several burns maintained at one time. The Heritage Centre maintains the tradition by conducting twice-yearly charcoal burns. These are built in the traditional turf and earth method, whereby the wood is stacked tightly together in a dome, then covered in turf and earth to starve the fire of oxygen, ensuring that the wood dries out at a high temperature, but not burned. The charcoal produced would in the past have been used to achieve the high temperatures necessary to smelt the iron ore mined in the Forest. Nowadays, however, it is sold mainly for barbecues.

=== Freemine entrance ===
The five densely wooded acres of the Heritage Centre also feature Harvey's Folly, a replica of a freemine entrance built for the centre by retired freeminer Dave Harvey. The right to mine for coal is believed to have been first granted by Edward II, to any man born within the Forest of Dean's traditional boundaries, (known as the Hundred of St Briavels) and who has worked underground for a year and a day.

=== The Gage Library ===
Opened in 1995, the Gage Library provides a centre of local history resources for the Forest of Dean. It houses a major bequest from Laurie Gage, an antiquarian book dealer and philanthropist with a great personal interest in the area, who died in 1994. The Library contains over 1,500 volumes covering the history, geography and natural history the Forest of Dean and Wye Valley, and also possesses an impressive collection of historic maps dating back to the eighteenth century, along with the papers of many significant local figures from the last two centuries.

=== Events ===
The museum maintains a busy schedule of events including Craft markets, pumpkin carving and a traditional Santa at Christmas. Family craft events are held during school holidays.
