= Soudley =

Village in Gloucestershire, England

Coordinates: 51.792°N 2.497°W

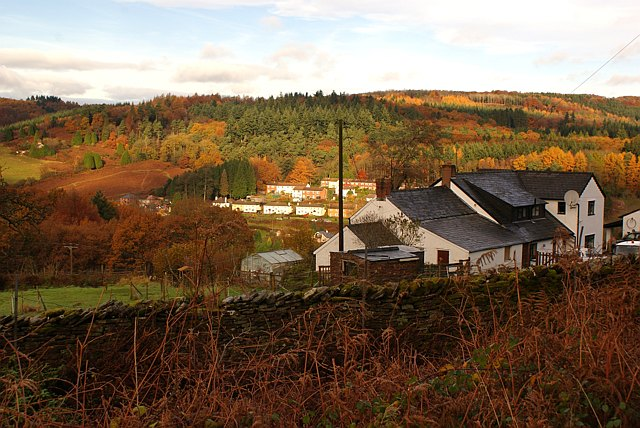
- Soudley, seen from Bradley Hill

- Location within Gloucestershire
- OS grid reference: SO660105
- Civil parish: Ruspidge and Soudley
- District: Forest of Dean
- Shire county: Gloucestershire
- Region: South West
- Country: England
- Sovereign state: United Kingdom
- Post town: Cinderford
- Postcode district: GL14
- Police: Gloucestershire
- Fire: Gloucestershire
- Ambulance: South Western
- UK Parliament: Forest of Dean

Soudley, including Upper Soudley, is a village to the west of Cinderford, in the civil parish of Ruspidge and Soudley, in the Forest of Dean district, Gloucestershire, England.

Soudley is a popular destination for tourists visiting the Forest of Dean, largely due to the local scenery and its proximity to several tourist attractions. Nearby attractions include the Dean Heritage Centre, Soudley Ponds, Blaize Bailey viewpoint and the Blue Rock Trail. Activities at the Dean Heritage Centre include chain-saw wood carving and courses on manual wood turning. There are also many educational resources available on site and, as a result, the centre is regularly frequented by schools from the local area and Wales.

A number of small guest houses and holiday-let properties exist in the village, catering for people wishing to enjoy the local countryside or use the village as a base when visiting the Forest of Dean.

Soudley Brook runs through the village, and is used to host the annual Soudley Duck Race; where residents and visitors gather to sponsor ducks and race them the length of the village. The day is accompanied by a small fair that takes place in the village hall.

The village has a public house called the White Horse. It has two skittles teams and regularly hosts events such as quiz nights and snail races.

The village also has a football club that competes in the North Gloucestershire Division 1.

== Notable people ==
- Valerie Grosvenor Myer (1935–2007), novelist and literary historian, born & lived for 21 years in Lower Soudley.
