= Forest of Dean =

Geographical, historical and cultural region in England

Coordinates: 51.79°N 2.54°W

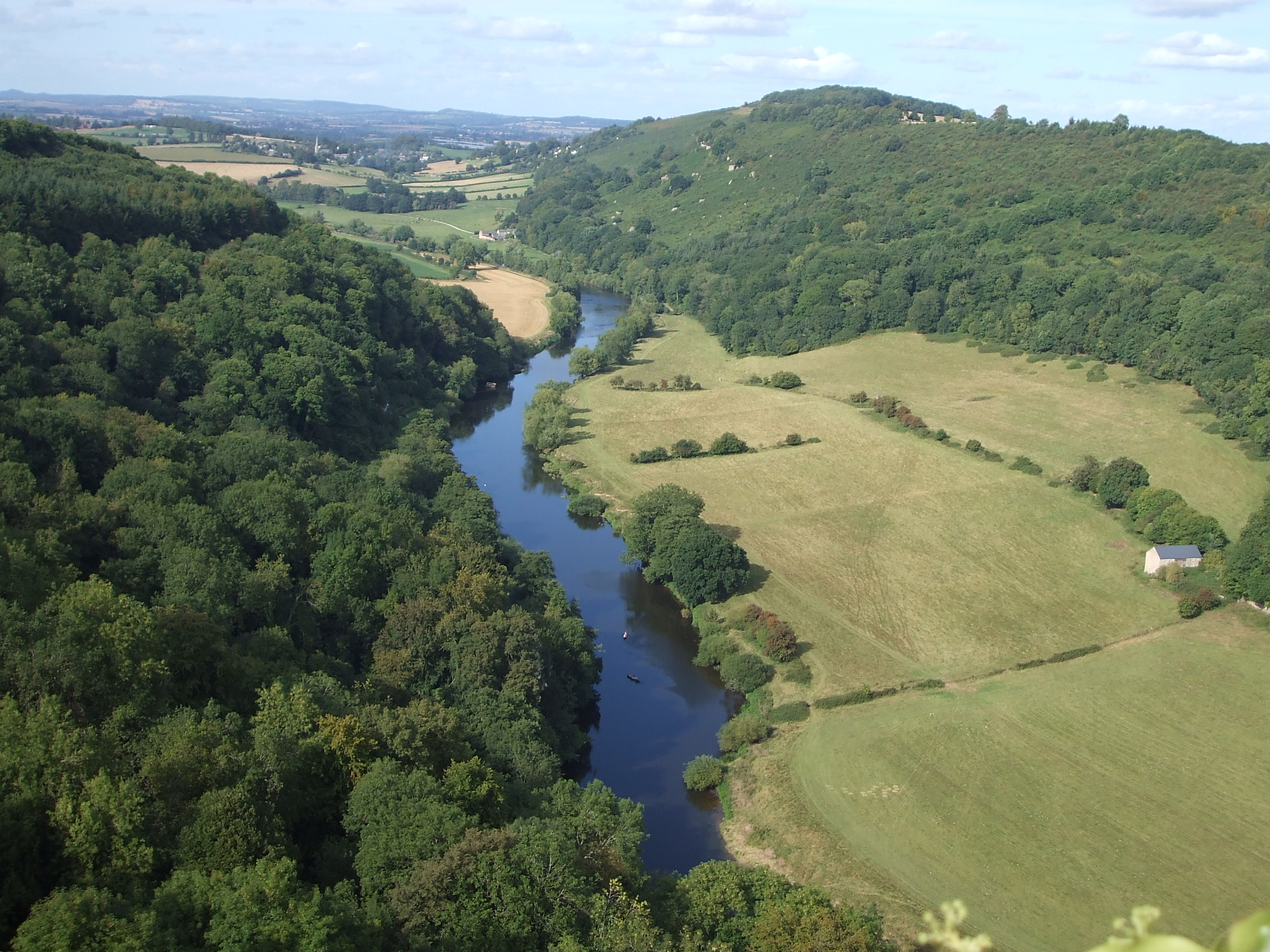
The view north towards Ross-on-Wye from Symonds Yat Rock, a popular tourist destination near the Forest

The Forest of Dean (Forest of Dean English: Vorest o’ Dean) is a geographical, historical and cultural region in the western part of the county of Gloucestershire, England. It forms a roughly triangular plateau bounded by the River Wye to the west and northwest, Herefordshire to the north, the River Severn to the south, and the City of Gloucester to the east.

The area is characterised by more than 110 square kilometres (42 sq mi) of mixed woodland, one of the surviving ancient woodlands in England. A large area was reserved for royal hunting before 1066, and remained as the second largest crown forest in England, after the New Forest, 105 kilometres (65 mi) to the southeast. Although the name is used loosely to refer to the part of Gloucestershire between the Severn and Wye, the Forest of Dean proper has covered a much smaller area since the Middle Ages. In 1327, it was defined to cover only the royal demesne and parts of parishes within the hundred of St Briavels, and after 1668 comprised the royal demesne only. The Forest proper is within the civil parishes of West Dean, Lydbrook, Cinderford, Ruspidge, and Drybrook, together with a strip of land in the parish of English Bicknor.

Traditionally the main sources of work have been forestry – including charcoal production – iron working and coal mining. Archaeological studies have dated the earliest use of coal to Roman times for domestic heating and industrial processes such as the preparation of iron ore.

The area gives its name to the local government district, Forest of Dean, and a parliamentary constituency, both of which cover wider areas than the historic Forest. The administrative centre of the local authority is Coleford, one of the main towns in the historic Forest area, together with Cinderford and Lydney.

== Toponym ==
The origin of the name is unknown. The prevalence of Welsh place names in the area suggests a possible corruption of din (meaning "hillfort"). However, similar or identical elements from Old English exist throughout England. In Welsh, Forest of Dean is Fforest y Ddena.

Gerald of Wales, writing in the 12th century, refers to the area as Danubia which may translate as "land of Danes" following the Viking settlements in that era. It is possible that an original name Dene developed from this.

== History ==
=== Prehistory ===
The area was inhabited in Mesolithic times, and there are also remains of later megalithic monuments, including the Longstone near Staunton and the Broadstone at Wibdon, Stroat. Barrows have been identified at Tidenham and Blakeney. Bronze Age field systems have been identified at Welshbury Hill near Littledean, and there are Iron Age hill forts at Symonds Yat and Welshbury. There is archaeological evidence of early trading by sea, probably through Lydney. Before Roman times, the area may have been occupied by the British Dobunni tribe, although few of their coins have been found in the area and control may have been contested with the neighbouring Silures.

=== Roman Britain ===
The area was occupied by the Romans in around AD 50. They were attracted by its natural resources which included iron ore, ochre and charcoal. The coal mining industry was probably established on a small scale in Roman times. The area was governed from the Roman town of Ariconium at Weston under Penyard near Ross-on-Wye, and a road was built from there to a river crossing at Newnham on Severn and a port at Lydney. The "Dean Road", still visible at Soudley, is believed to be a medieval rebuilding of the Roman road, and would have been an important route to transport iron ore and finished metal products. During Roman times there were Roman villas at Blakeney, Woolaston and elsewhere, and towards the end of the Roman period, around AD 370, a major Roman temple complex dedicated to the god Nodens was completed at Lydney. The central parts of the woodlands in the forest are believed to have been protected for hunting since Roman times.

=== Medieval ===
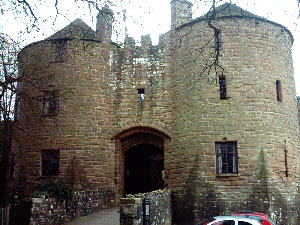
St Briavels Castle

The area formed part of the Cantref Coch and was traditionally considered part of the Brythonic kingdom of Ergyng, centered in modern Herefordshire. Even when the area came under Anglo-Saxon control, the Forest of Dean remained under the auspices of the diocese of Hereford, rather than Gloucester. The Beachley and Lancaut peninsulas east of the Lower Wye remained in Welsh control at least until the 8th century.

Around 790 the Saxon King Offa of Mercia built his dyke high above the Wye, but the area was still claimed by the Kingdom of Gwent and Morgannwg before it was annexed into the kingdom of England by Æthelstan in 926.

Throughout the next few centuries Vikings conducted raids up the Severn, but by the 11th century, the kingdom of Wessex had established civil government. The core of the forest was used by the late Anglo-Saxon kings, and after 1066 the Normans, as their personal hunting ground. The area was kept stocked with deer and wild boar and became important for timber, charcoal, iron ore and limestone.

=== Norman era ===
The Hundred of St Briavels was established in the 12th century, at the same time as many Norman laws concerning the Forest of Dean were put in place. St Briavels Castle became the Forest's administrative and judicial centre. Verderers were appointed to act for the king and protect his royal rights, and local people were given some common rights. Flaxley Abbey was built and given rights and privileges. In 1296, miners from the Hundred of St Briavels supported King Edward I at the siege of Berwick-on-Tweed in the Scottish Wars of Independence by undermining the then Scottish town's defences in the first step of his campaign to seize Scotland from John Balliol. As a result, the king granted free mining rights within the forest to the miners and their descendants; the rights continue to the present day. Miners at that time were mainly involved in iron ore mining – although the presence of coal was well known, and limited amounts had been recovered in Roman times. Coal was not used for ironmaking with the methods of smelting then in use. Later the freeminer rights were used mainly for coal mining. The activities of the miners were regulated by the Court of Mine Law. This, and other forms of self-governance, coupled with the Forest's geographic isolation between the rivers Severn and Wye, has given rise to a strong sense of cultural identity in those from the area, who are collectively known as "Foresters". The ancient rights were put on the statute books in the Dean Forest (Mines) Act 1838, the only public act to affect private individuals. Residents of the hundred over 18 can graze sheep in the Forest in accordance with an agreement between Forestry England and the Commoners Association.

In October 2010 a woman won the right to be classified as a Freeminer. Elaine Morman, an employee at Clearwell Caves in the Forest, who had worked as a miner of ochre for a number of years, raised a claim of sexual discrimination against the Forestry Commission. After Mark Harper MP raised the matter in the House of Commons, the Forestry Commission reversed its position and agreed to register her.

=== Early modern period ===
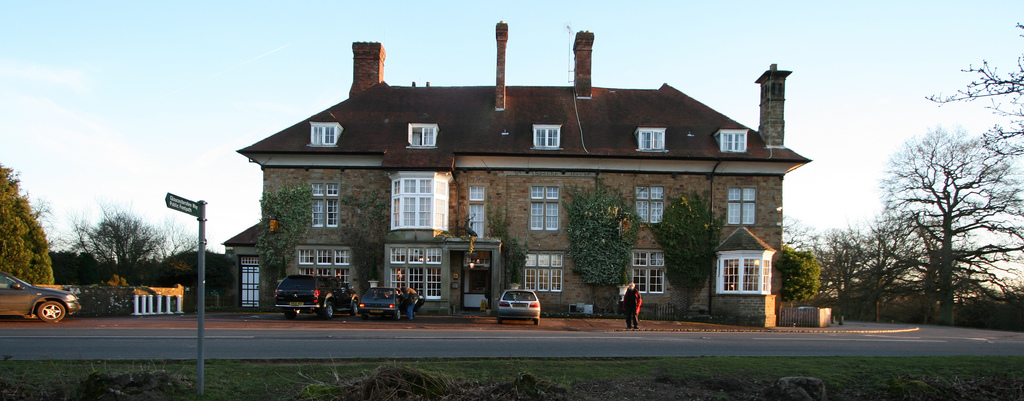
Speech House

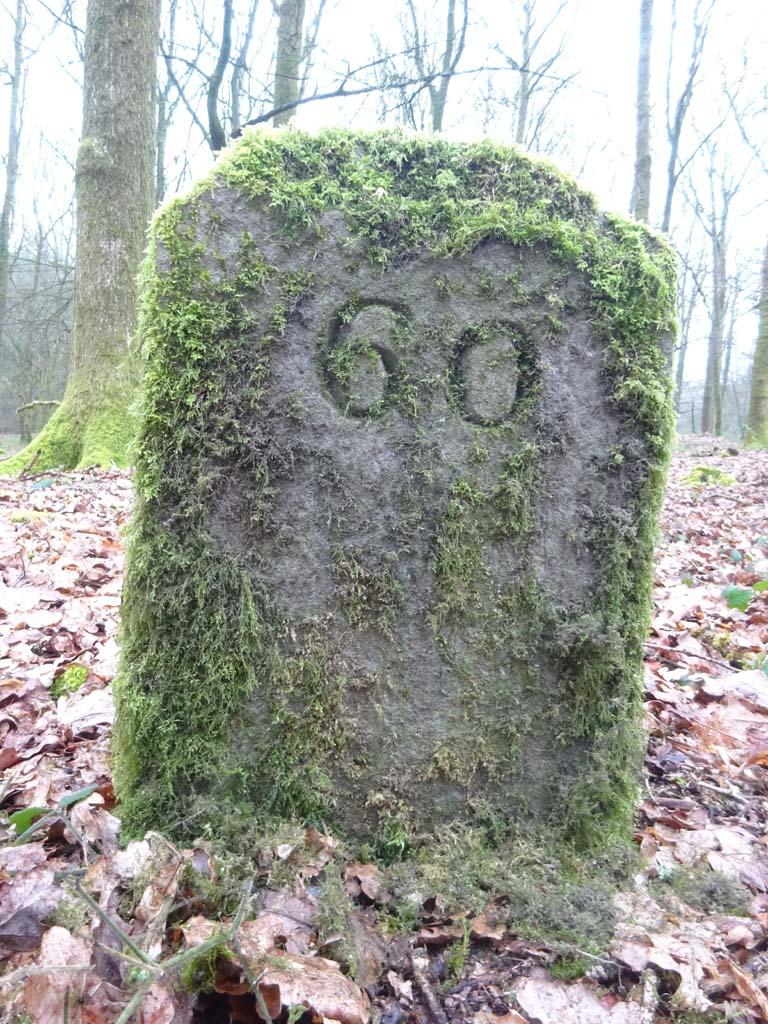
Typical gale stone marking mining rights, Sallowvaletts Inclosure

The forest was used exclusively as a royal hunting ground for the Tudors, and subsequently a source of food for the royal court. Its rich deposits of iron ore led to its becoming a major source of iron. The forest's timber was particularly fine, and was regarded as the best material for building ships.

In the 17th century, as a result of King Charles I's decision to rule without Parliament, he sought to raise finances through grants of royal forest lands. 3,000 acres (1,200 ha) of the Forest of Dean was disafforested in the 1620s, causing a series of riots in 1631–32; this was part of enclosure riots across the South West commonly known as the Western Rising. In 1639 22,000 acres (8,900 ha) were disafforested, with 4,000 acres (1,600 ha) going to manorial lords and freeholders in compensation. 18,000 acres (7,300 ha) were to go to the Crown, and be sold on to Sir John Winter. Riots ensued in 1641. Winter's claim to the lands was voided by Parliament in March 1642, in part because he had failed to pay. His assets were sequestrated for supporting the Crown during the Civil War. The Protectorate tried to enclose a third of the forest in 1657, leaving two thirds to the commoners. Although a relatively generous settlement, it caused resistance in April and May 1659, when fences of new enclosures were broken and cattle brought in to graze. Royalists including Edward Massey attempted to bring the discontented to the side of Charles II.

After the restoration Sir John Winter successfully reasserted his right to the Forest of Dean. However forest law was re-established by an act of Parliament, the Dean Forest Act 1667 (19 & 20 Cha. 2. c. 8) in 1668. In 1672 the king's ironworks were closed to reduce pressure on the forest from mining. The Speech House, between Coleford and Cinderford, was built in 1682 to host the Court of Mine Law and "Court of the Speech", a sort of parliament for the Verderers and Free Miners managing the forest, game, and mineral resources. Colloquially known as the "Verderer's Court". The Gaveller and his deputy were responsible for leasing gales – areas allocated for mining – on behalf of the Crown. The Speech House has been used as an inn and hotel since the 19th century.

=== Georgian era ===
The Forest of Dean, with its huge iron ore reserves and ready supply of timber, had been of national importance in the production of iron, using charcoal, for hundreds of years. Despite the abundance of coal, it was not until the last decade of the 18th century that local ironmasters were prepared to invest in the technology needed to produce iron from coke, when coke-fired furnaces at Cinderford, Whitecliff and Parkend were built almost simultaneously.

During the 18th century, squatters established roughly-built hamlets around the fringes of the Crown forest demesne. By about 1800, these settlements were well established at Berry Hill and Parkend.

In 1808 Parliament passed the Dean and New Forests Act 1808, which included the provision to enclose 11,000 acres (4,500 ha) of woodland. This enclosure was carried out between 1814 and 1816.

There were bread riots in 1795 and in 1801. Ordinary Foresters were already poverty-stricken, and their plight had grown worse. They were denied access to the enclosed areas and unable to hunt or remove timber. In particular, they lost their ancient grazing and mining rights.

As unrest grew, a populist leader named Warren James emerged in the riots against the enclosures. Attempts to peaceably resolve the matter failed, and on 8 June 1831, James, leading more than 100 Foresters, demolished the enclosure at Park Hill, between Parkend and Bream. Around 50 unarmed Crown Officers were powerless to intervene. On the Friday, a party of 50 soldiers arrived from Monmouth, but by now the number of Foresters had grown to around 2,000 and the soldiers returned to barracks. Over the next few days more troops arrived from around the country. The Foresters' resistance crumbled and most of those arrested elected to rebuild the enclosures, rather than be charged with rioting. James was sentenced to death but his sentence was later commuted to transportation. He was sent to Van Diemen's Land (Tasmania) in October 1831, only to be pardoned five years later, although he never returned home.

Conservatives were disliked in the Forest of Dean; on polling day in 1874, there was a riot in the market town of Cinderford in which the Conservative party headquarters and nearby houses were ransacked and damaged.

=== "Who killed the bears?" ===
On 26 April 1889, four Frenchmen and their two bears were making their way to Ruardean, having performed in Cinderford. They were attacked by an angry mob, enraged by claims that the bears had killed a child and injured a woman. The bears were killed and the Frenchmen badly beaten.

It soon became clear that the bears had not attacked anyone. Police proceedings followed and a week later 13 colliers and labourers appeared before magistrates at Littledean, charged with ill-treating and killing the bears and assaulting the Frenchmen. All but two were found guilty on one or more charges, with another convicted a week later. A total of £85 (equivalent to £9,400 in 2025) was paid in fines. A subscription was also launched which generously compensated the Frenchmen.

The term "Who killed the bears?" existed for many years as an insult, directed particularly towards the people of Ruardean – despite the fact that all those convicted were from Cinderford.

A fictional version of the incident was used by Dennis Potter for his TV play A Beast With Two Backs.

=== Rise and fall of industrialisation ===
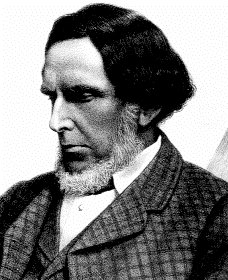
Robert Forester Mushet (1811–1891), steel industry pioneer

Exploitation of the Forest of Dean Coalfield developed rapidly in the early 19th century with increased demand from local ironworks, and when some of the earliest tramroads in the UK were built here to transport coal to local ports the area was transformed by the growth of mining and the production of iron and steel.

In 1818–19 David Mushet built Darkhill Ironworks, where he experimented with iron and steel making. In 1845, his youngest son, Robert Forester Mushet, took over its management. He perfected the Bessemer Process by solving the quality problems which beset the process. In a second key advance in metallurgy he invented Mushet steel (R.M.S.) in 1868. It was the first true tool steel and the first air-hardening steel. It revolutionised the design of machine tools and the progress of industrial metalworking, and was the forerunner of High speed steel. The remains of Darkhill are preserved as an Industrial Archaeological Site of International Importance and are open to the public.

The Park Gutter pit was renamed Princess Royal after Princess Victoria in 1842. The Princess Royal Colliery Company was founded in 1891 to work Park Gutter and Flour Mill Pits. It reached peak production in the 1930s, employing 1300 men. The pits closed in 1962.

Cinderford was laid out as a planned town in the mid-19th century, but the characteristic form of settlement remained the sprawling hamlets of haphazardly placed cottages. Characteristics shared with other British coalfields, such as a devotion to sport, the central role of miners' clubs, and the formation of brass bands, created a distinct community identity.

In the late 19th and early 20th centuries, the Forest was a complex industrial region with deep coal mines, iron mines, iron and tinplate works, foundries, quarries and stone-dressing works, wood distillation works producing chemicals, a network of railways, and numerous tramroads. The tradition of independence in the area resulted in a great number of smaller and not necessarily economically successful mines. In 1904 the Gaveller oversaw a period of amalgamation of collieries which allowed deeper mines to be sunk. During the early 20th century, annual output from the coalfield rarely fell below 1 million tons.

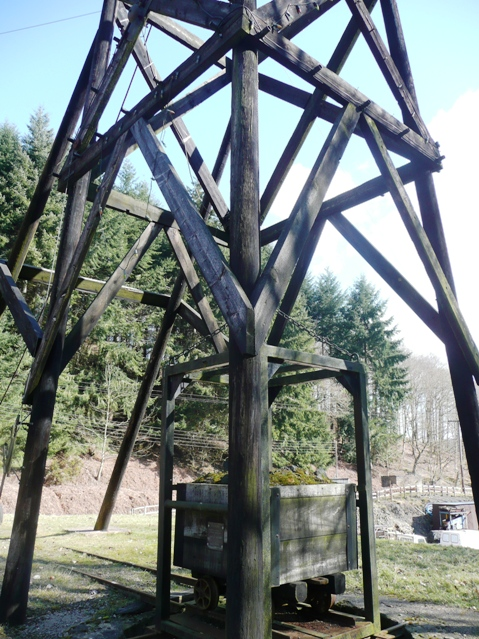
Part of the pithead structure at Hopewell Colliery museum

In 1945 half of the male working population worked in the coal industry but after the Second World War increased pumping costs and other factors made the coalfield less economic. The last commercial iron mine closed in 1946 followed in 1965 by the closure of the last large colliery, Northern United. There are still small private mines in operation, worked by freeminers and Hopewell Colliery is open to the public.

In 1954 there was a government plan to store radioactive waste in disused mines. These plans were abandoned following local opposition.

With the decline of the mines, the area has undergone a period of significant change, ameliorated to some extent by a shift to high technology, with companies establishing themselves in the area, attracted by grants and a willing workforce.

=== Visitor destination ===
Many mines have now been reclaimed by the forest and the area is characterised by picturesque scenery punctuated by remnants of the industrial age and small towns. There remain a number of industrial areas but the focus has been to capitalise on the scenery and to create jobs from tourist attractions and the leisure sector. Significant numbers of residents work outside the area, commuting to Gloucester, Cheltenham, Bristol, Newport and Cardiff.

== Natural history ==
=== Geology ===
The Forest of Dean is formed of a raised basin of palaeozoic rocks folded in the Variscan Orogeny, similar to the South Wales coalfield to the west. Underlain by great thicknesses of the Old Red Sandstone, the basin is filled with Carboniferous limestones, sandstones and coal measures, all of which have contributed to the industrial history of the region. Its highest point is Ruardean Hill (290 m, 950 ft).

=== Ecology ===
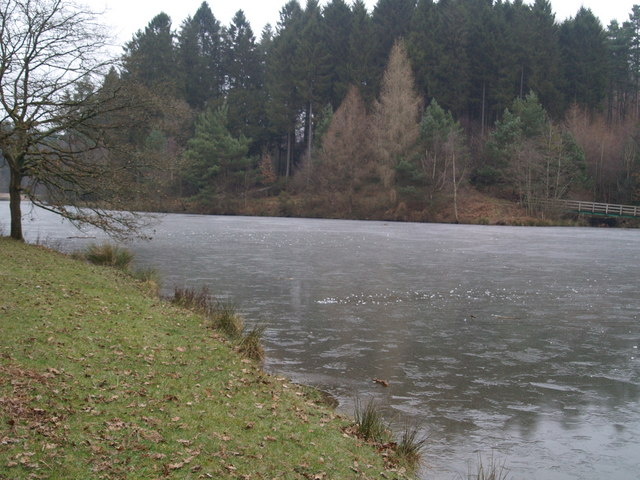
Lake at Mallards Pike, frozen during winter

The forest is composed of deciduous and evergreen trees. Predominant is oak, both pedunculate and sessile. Beech is common and sweet chestnut has grown here for many centuries. The forest is home to foxgloves and other wild flowers. Conifers include some Weymouth pine from 1781, Norway spruce, Douglas fir and larch. The deer are predominantly fallow deer and have been present since the second world war (there were no deer from about 1855 when they were removed in accordance with an Act of Parliament). A number of fallow deer in the central area are melanistic. Small numbers of roe deer and muntjac deer have spread in from the east.

The Forest is also home to wild boar. A population in the Ross-on-Wye area on the northern edge of the forest escaped from a wild boar farm around 1999 and are believed to be of pure Eastern European origin; in a second introduction, a domestic herd was dumped near Staunton in 2004, but are not pure bred wild boar. Attempts to locate the source of the illegal dumps were unsuccessful and boar can now be found in many parts of the Forest.

Locally there are mixed feelings about the presence of boar. Problems have included ploughing up gardens and picnic areas, attacking dogs and panicking horses, road traffic accidents, and ripping open rubbish bags. The local authority undertook a public consultation and have recommended to the Verderers that control is necessary. Under its international obligations the UK government is obliged to consider the reintroduction of species made extinct through the activities of man, the wild boar included.

The Forest of Dean is known for its woodland birds; pied flycatchers, redstarts, wood warblers, lesser spotted woodpecker, nightjars and hawfinches can be seen at RSPB Nagshead and other parts of the forest. The mixed forest supports one of Britain's highest concentrations of goshawks and a viewing site at New Fancy is staffed during February and March. However, goshawks are still illegally killed in the area, with a bird found dead with a shotgun wound in June 2022. Peregrine falcons can be seen from the viewpoint at Symonds Yat rock. Mandarin ducks, which nest in the trees, and reed warblers can be seen at Cannop Ponds and Cannop Brook, running from the ponds through Parkend, is famed for its dippers.

Butterflies of note are the small pearl-bordered fritillary, wood white and white admiral. Gorsty Knoll is famed for its glowworms and Woorgreens Lake for its dragonflies.

The Forest of Dean is also a stronghold for Britain's only venomous snake, the European adder, although its population is now believed to be in dramatic decline.

=== Geography ===
The lists below include towns, villages and places of interest which are within the historic Forest; they do not include places which are located outside that area, but which are within the larger District Council area.

Towns and villages

- Alvington
- Aylburton
- Awre
- Berry Hill
- Blaize Bailey
- Blakeney
- Bream
- Brierley
- Broadwell
- Cinderford
- Clearwell
- Coleford
- Coalway
- Drybrook
- Dymock
- Edge End
- Ellwood
- English Bicknor
- Gorsty Knoll
- Harrow Hill
- Hewelsfield
- Hartpury
- Huntley
- Joys Green
- Littledean
- Little London
- Longhope
- Lydbrook
- Milkwall
- Mitcheldean
- Newland
- Newnham
- Parkend
- Pillowell
- Ruardean
- Ruardean Hill
- Ruardean Woodside
- Ruspidge
- Soudley
- Sling
- St Briavels
- Staunton
- Steam Mills
- The Pludds
- Westbury
- Whitecroft
- Woolaston
- Yorkley

Places of interest

- Beechenhurst
- Bixslade
- Blaize Bailey View Point
- Cannop Ponds
- Clearwell Caves
- Cyril Hart Arboretum
- Darkhill Ironworks
- Dean Forest Railway
- Dean Heritage Centre
- Forest of Dean Cycle Centre
- Great Western Railway Museum
- Laymoor Quag
- Littledean Jail
- Lydney Canal
- Mallards Pike Lake
- New Fancy
- Parkend Ironworks
- Parkend railway station
- Perrygrove Railway
- Puzzlewood
- RSPB Nagshead
- Sculpture Trail
- Soudley Ponds
- Speech House
- Symond's Yat
- Whitecliff Ironworks
- Woorgreens Lake and Marsh

== Transport ==
=== Roads ===
The A40 runs along the northern and northeastern edges of the Forest of Dean. The road provides the Forest with a direct connection to Ross-on-Wye and the M50 in Herefordshire. Westbound, the road runs towards Monmouth and South Wales. To the East, the road links the Forest directly to Gloucester, the M5, Cheltenham and Oxford. North of the Forest, the road is managed by National Highways.

To the southeast of the Forest, the A48 links the region to Chepstow, the M4 and Newport, or Gloucester. This route passes around the Lydney area and follows the course of the River Severn.

Other key routes include:

- the A4136 – Huntley to Monmouth, via Mitcheldean and Coleford
- the A4151 – Westbury-on-Severn to Mitcheldean via Cinderford

Nitrogen Dioxide (NO_{2}) levels, measured using roadside diffusion tubes, are generally well below the UK national target for clean air, set at 40 μg/m^{3} (micrograms per cubic metre). In 2017, no roadside monitoring site in the Forest of Dean District failed to meet the UK objective. The most polluted site measured was on Lydney High Street, with a 2017 average NO_{2} concentration of 36.9 μg/m^{3}.

=== Railways ===
The Forest of Dean once boasted a developed railway network, much of which evolved from plateways built in the early 19th century to facilitate freight traffic to and from mineral workings in the Forest. Many of these lines were part of the Severn and Wye Railway, which ran from the River Severn at Lydney to Cinderford, with branch lines to Lydbrook, where it connected with the Ross & Monmouth Railway, and Coleford, where it linked to the Wye Valley Railway via a line known as the Coleford Railway. The Forest of Dean Railway also ran towards Cinderford and its nearby collieries, branching from the South Wales Railway at Bullo Pill. The less successful Forest of Dean Central Railway attempted to compete with the other lines for coal traffic but was rendered obsolete by the opening of the Mineral Loop, a new line opened by the Severn & Wye to connect a number of pitheads. Most of these railways now cease to exist, with most of the railways in the Forest abandoned by 1968. A section of the Dean Forest Railway between Lydney Junction and Norchard is now a heritage railway.

The Gloucester-Newport line continues to carry passengers. Lydney railway station serves the Forest of Dean, with 0.196 million passenger entries and exits in 2017–18. The station is served by trains operated by Transport for Wales, linking the Forest directly to Cheltenham and Gloucester to the north, and Chepstow, Newport, Cardiff and onward destinations in South Wales. CrossCountry runs limited services to the station, linking the Forest to Birmingham New Street and onward destinations in the Midlands.

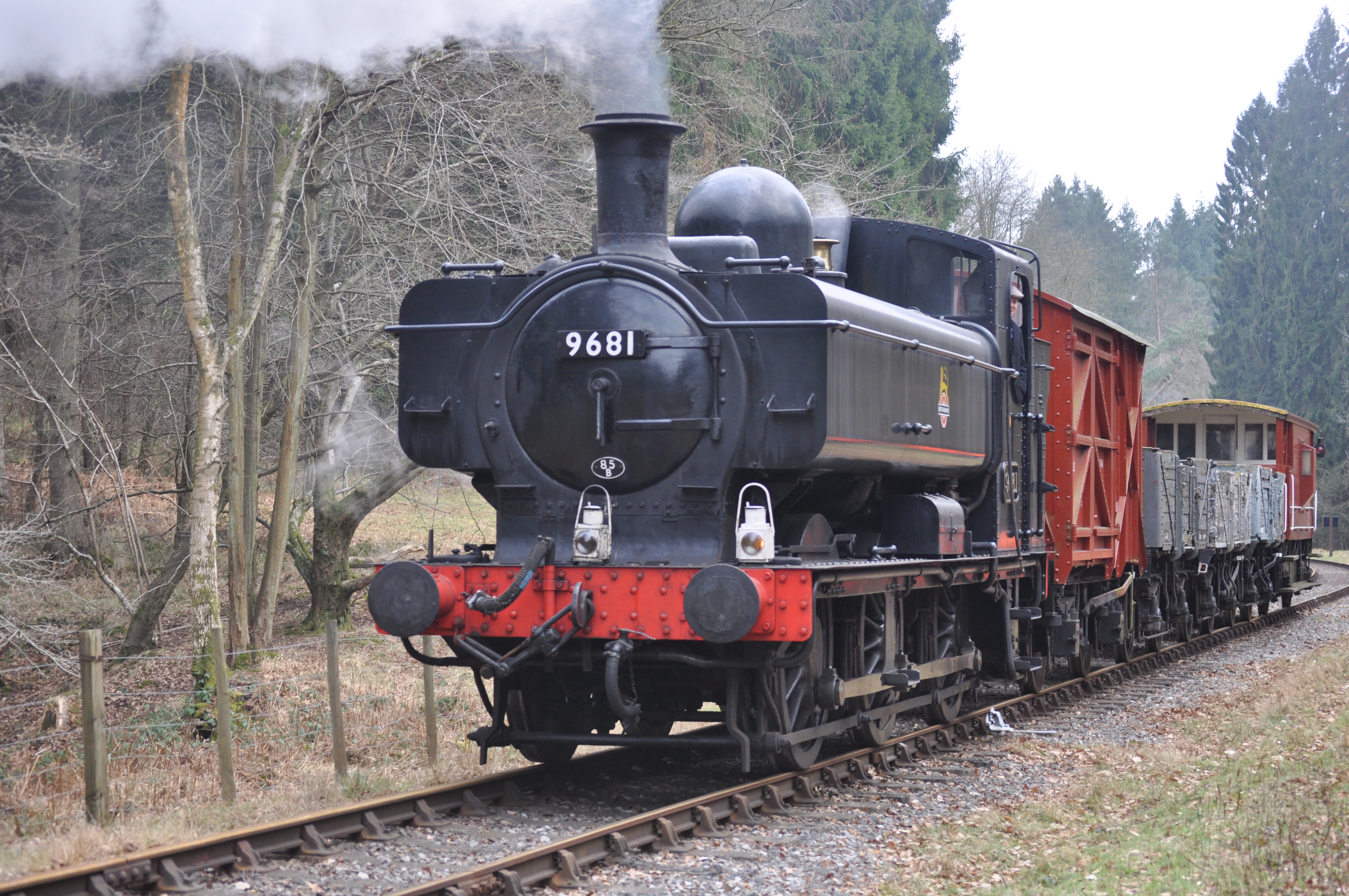
Dean Forest Railway near Parkend

== Notable people ==
- Arthur Hulin Gosling (1901–1982) Director General of the Forestry Commission born and raised in Forest of Dean.

== In popular culture ==
In 1967, John Berger's sociological work A Fortunate Man was set in the Forest of Dean. A film of the same name was filmed in the Forest of Dean in 1972.

Heavy metal band Black Sabbath rented Clearwell Castle in 1973 to write and record their fifth album, Sabbath Bloody Sabbath. The band rehearsed in the castle dungeon for inspiration. In 1978, the members of Led Zeppelin reconvened at the castle after a period apart, and began writing and rehearsing what became their In Through the Out Door album.

J. K. Rowling, author of the Harry Potter series, sets several crucial chapters of her final Harry Potter book in this forest.

In July 2014, scenes from Star Wars: The Force Awakens were filmed in Puzzlewood.

Several locations in the forest were used as a filming location for multiple scenes in the Netflix series Sex Education (2019–2023).

The 2023 Channel Four series The Change was set in the forest.

== See also ==
- Beast of Dean
- Blue Remembered Hills
- Forest Styre, old English variety of cider apple which was local to the Forest
- Hands off our Forest (HOOF)
