= Newnham on Severn =

Village in Gloucestershire, England

Coordinates: 51.803°N 2.450°W

Newnham
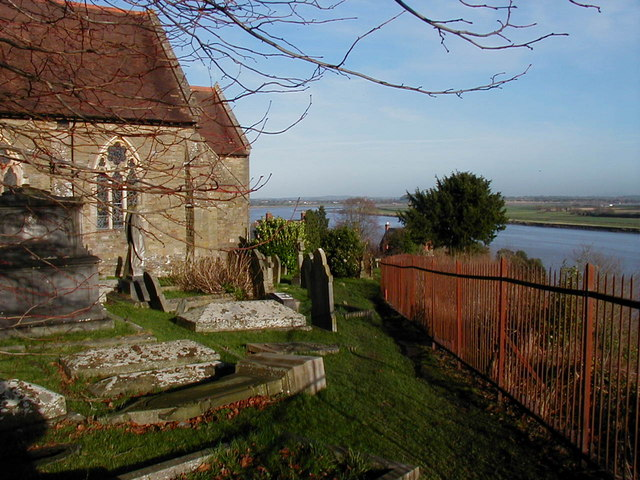
- St Peter's Church, Newnham

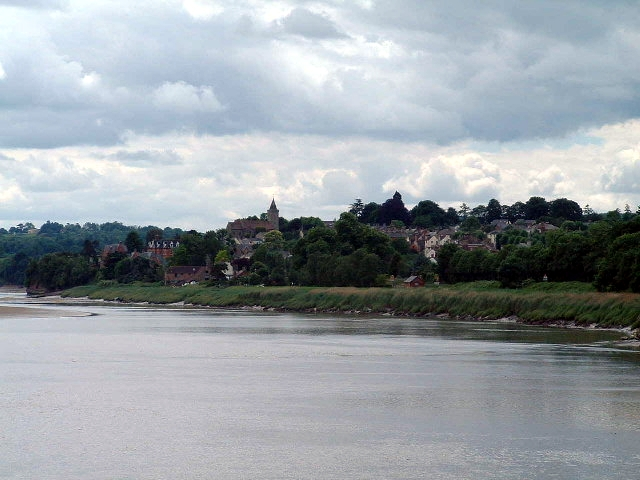
- Newnham on Severn from the riverside

- Location within Gloucestershire
- Population: 1,296 (2011)
- OS grid reference: SO691117
- Civil parish: Newnham
- District: Forest of Dean
- Shire county: Gloucestershire
- Region: South West
- Country: England
- Sovereign state: United Kingdom
- Post town: NEWNHAM
- Postcode district: GL14
- Dialling code: 01594
- Police: Gloucestershire
- Fire: Gloucestershire
- Ambulance: South Western
- UK Parliament: Forest of Dean

Newnham or Newnham on Severn is a village in west Gloucestershire, England. It lies in the Royal Forest of Dean, on the west bank of the River Severn, approximately 10 miles south-west of Gloucester and three miles southeast of Cinderford. It is on the A48 road between Gloucester and Chepstow, Monmouthshire, Wales. The village has a parish council.

A parish church was established in the 14th century (although there had been a chapel of ease since 1018), and in 1366 a new church building was built on the high ground of the village as the old one faced erosion from the river. The new building has itself been damaged by a gunpowder explosion in 1644 during the English Civil War and a fire in 1881, but is still in use.

The Ancient Romans built three roads through the location, where they forded the River Severn. The Anglo-Saxons established a permanent settlement, the Normans built a motte-and-bailey fortification for defence, and in medieval times it became a major port with links around Great Britain and Ireland. In 1171, Henry II of England staged an invasion of Ireland from Newnham. One account claimed that he set sail with 400 ships and 5,000 men, which suggests its importance as a port. For a time Newnham was the most successful Gloucestershire town west of the Severn. Its role as a port and trading hub declined, however, rapidly with the 1827 opening of the Gloucester and Sharpness Canal.

The diplomat and scientist Sir Kenelm Digby set up a glassworks at Newnham in about 1630, and was able to make strong glass bottles, for which he secured a patent. This allowed the storage of wines which continued to ferment in the bottle, and enabled drinks such as champagne to be stored and transported. The strong glass used for champagne bottles is still known in France as verre Anglais.

In 1810, an early attempt at a Severn tunnel began construction just south of Newnham. Work was abandoned after flooding in 1812.

Matron Eva Luckes of The London Hospital lived in Newnham.

The scenic Gloucester to Newport railway line goes through a tunnel here. Newnham railway station opened in 1851 and closed in 1964.

On the A48 towards Gloucester, the Silver Fox cafe was used by touring musicians including The Beatles, the Rolling Stones, Shirley Bassey and Matt Monro. Richard Burton also stopped there. The cafe is in Broadoak, in the Parish of Westbury on Severn.

In July 2017, retired lecturer William Riches gained media attention due to declaring his home, called Middle Watch House, as an independent state, naming it the "Independent Republic of Middlewatch", as protest against the exit of the United Kingdom from the European Union. His wife, Judy, was the president, with himself as the vice president. There were plans to adopt the Euro, and to charge UK visitors to his home £50 for a European visa.

== Governance ==
The civil parish is part of Newnham and Westbury electoral ward. This ward starts in the north at Westbury-on-Severn and then follows the River Severn to Newnham. The total population of the ward taken at the 2011 census was 3,088.

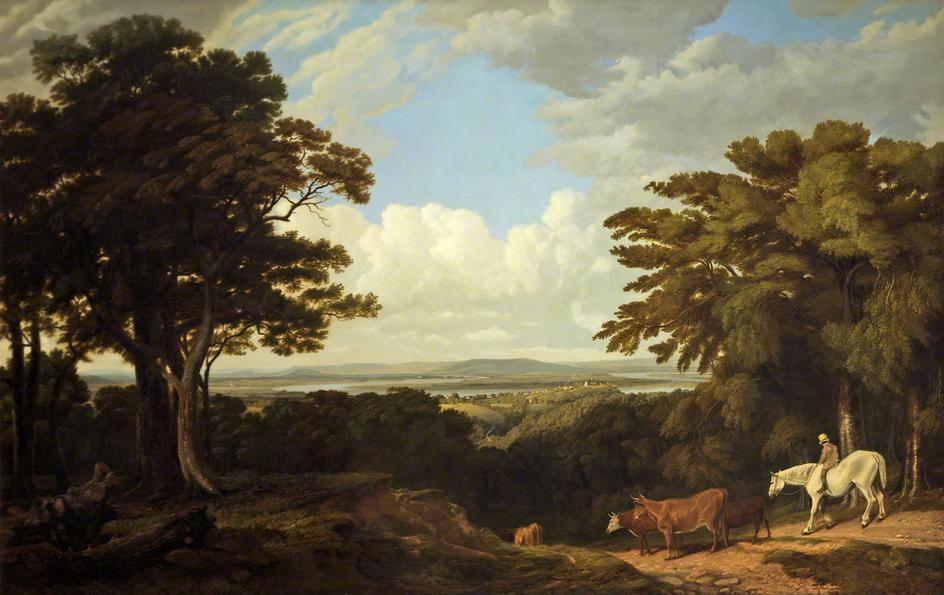
Newnham-on-Severn from Dean Hill by William Turner of Oxford (1789–1862)
