= Newnham railway station =

Former railway station in England

Coordinates: 51.8080°N 2.4532°W

Newnham
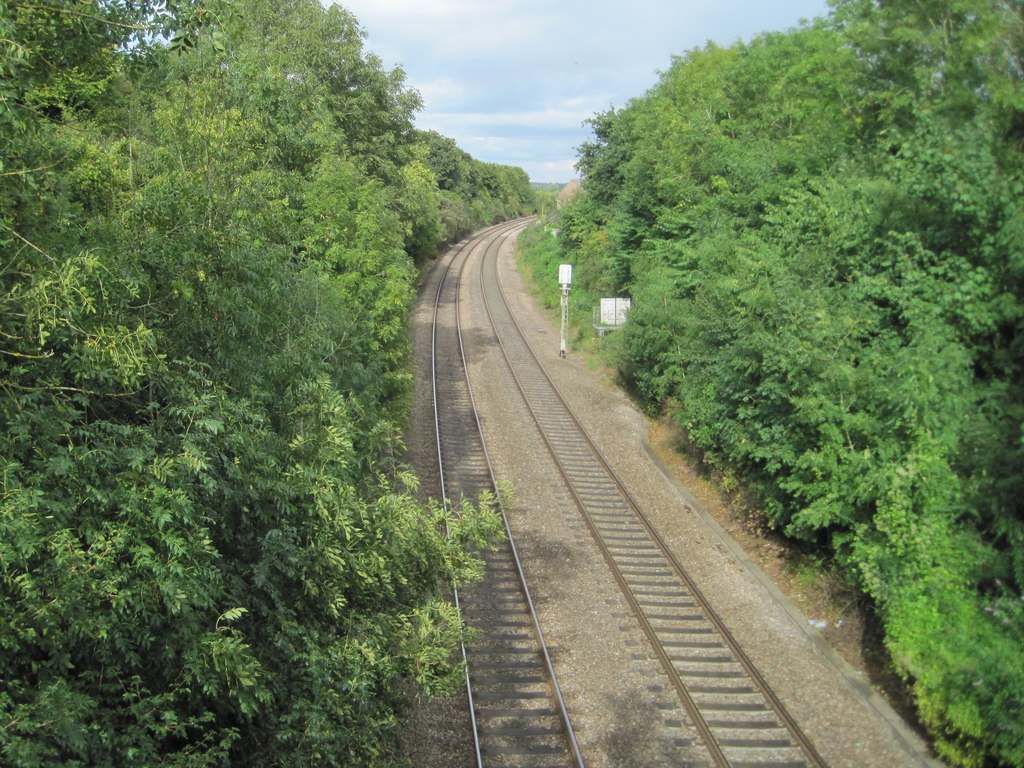
- The site of the station in 2013

General information
- Location: Newnham on Severn, Forest of Dean; England
- Grid reference: SO688122
- Platforms: 2

Other information
- Status: Disused

History
- Original company: South Wales Railway
- Pre-grouping: Great Western Railway
- Post-grouping: Great Western Railway

Key dates
- 19 September 1851: Opened
- 5 May 1941: Closed
- 7 October 1946: Re-opened
- 2 November 1964: Closed
Location

Newnham railway station was a station serving the village of Newnham on Severn, Gloucestershire.

== History ==
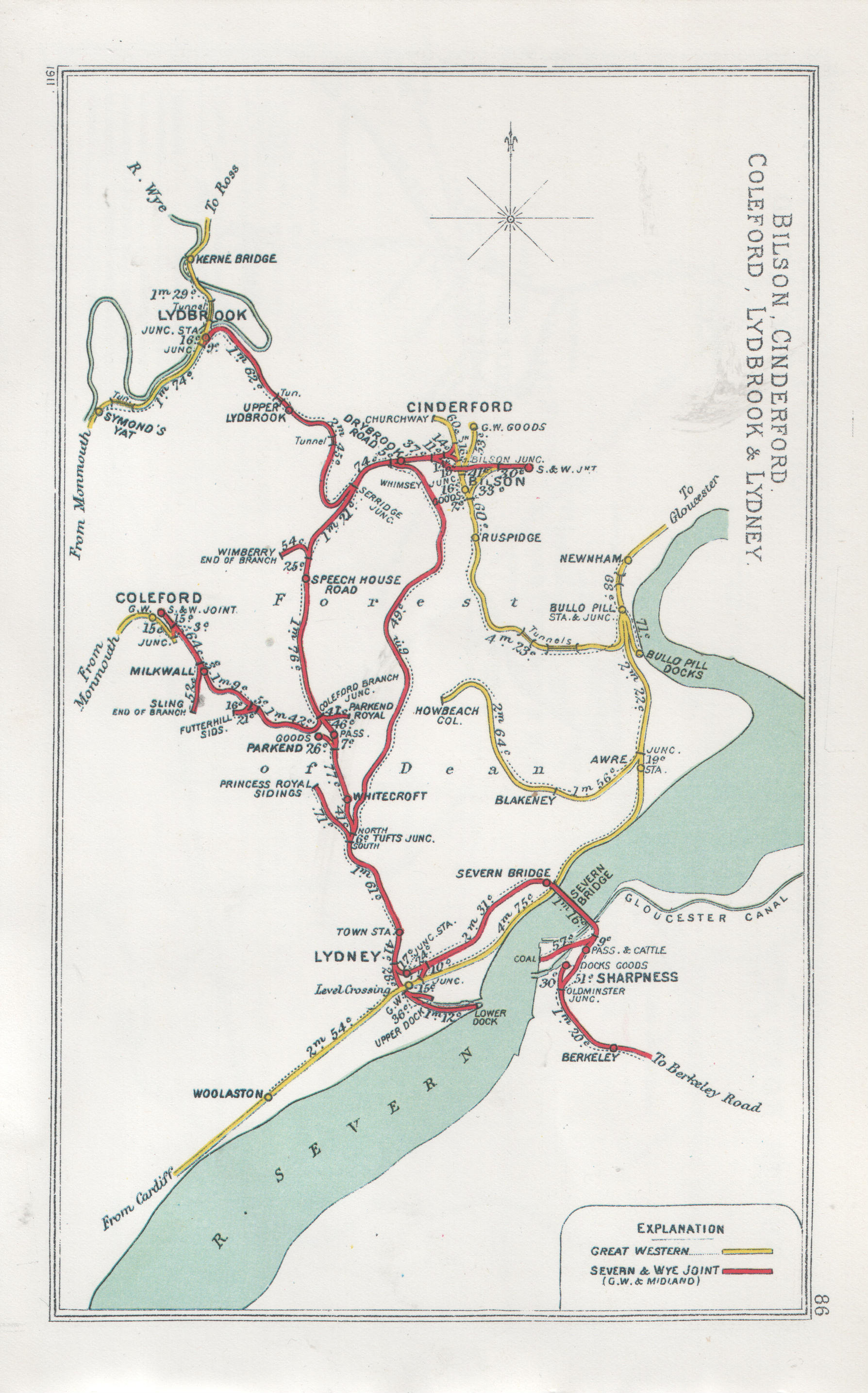
A 1911 Railway Clearing House map of railways in the vicinity of Newnham

The South Wales Railway was formed in 1845 to build a line from Chepstow to Fishguard and to Pembroke Dock; an eastern extension to Grange Court was soon added, which would meet a westward extension of the Great Western Railway from Gloucester. The line from Gloucester to Chepstow East opened on 19 September 1851, and included a station at Newnham.

The station closed on 5 May 1941, and reopened on 7 October 1946.

Final closure came on 2 November 1964.

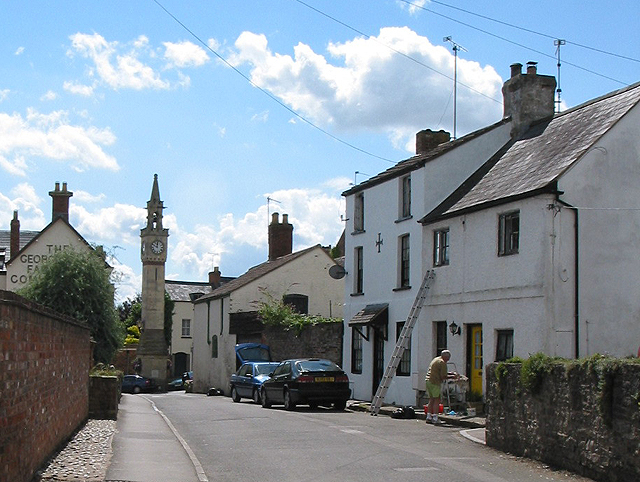
Station Road, Newnham on Severn.

== Route ==
Preceding station	Historical railways	Following station
Westbury-on-Severn Halt; Line open, station closed	Great Western Railway; South Wales Railway	Ruddle Road Halt; Line open, station closed

== See also ==
- Railways and Canals of the Forest of Dean
