= Thomas Bow City Asphalt =

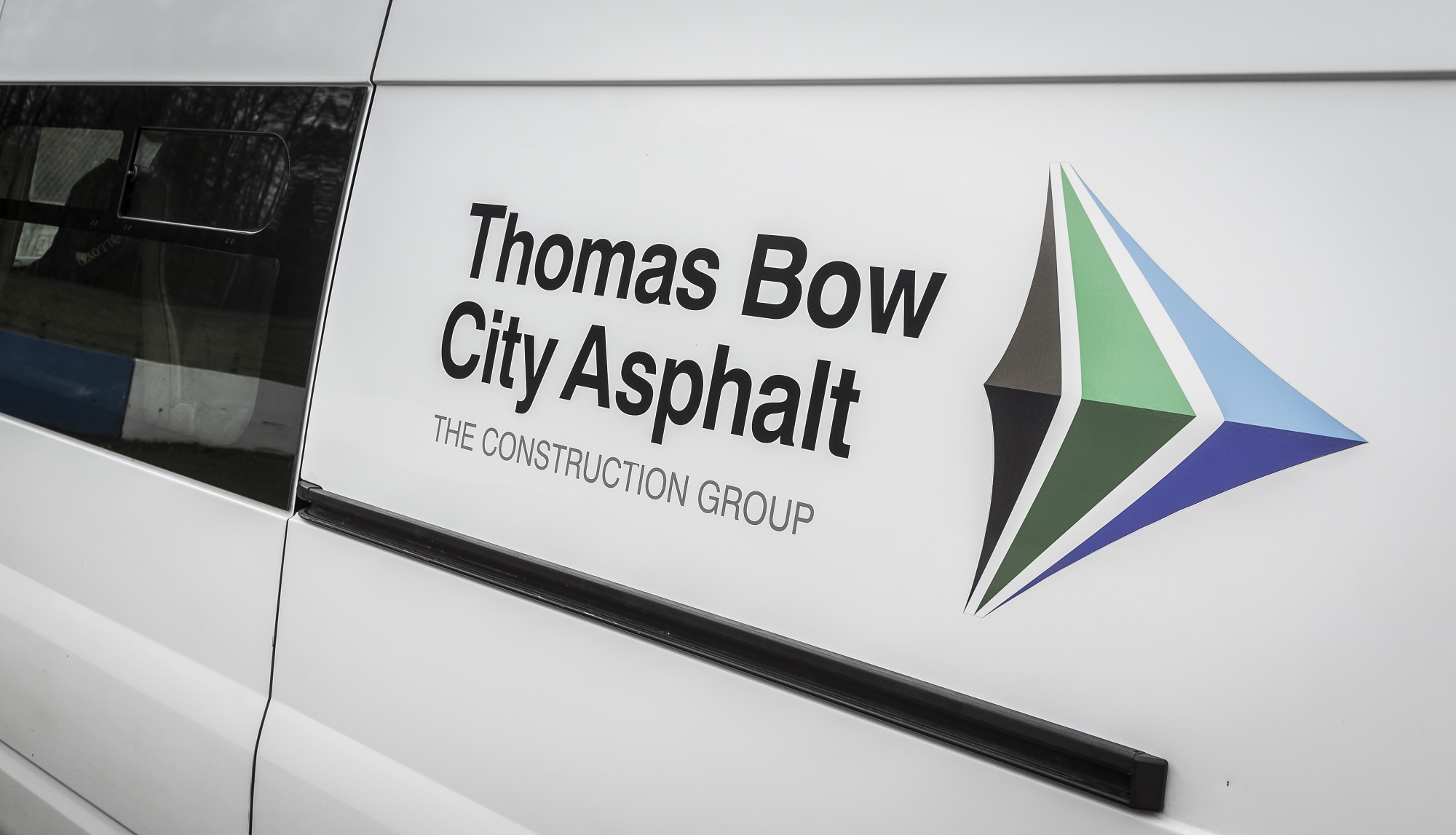
- Type: Private Limited Company
- Industry: Construction
- Founded: 1867 by Lawrence Bow in Nottingham
- Headquarters: Nottingham, United Kingdom
- Key people: Alistair Bow, Managing Director
- Website: www.thomasbow.com

Thomas Bow City Asphalt is a privately owned civil engineering and groundwork company, located in Nottingham, United Kingdom.

== History ==
The company was set up by Lawrence Bow in 1867 and now operates as a building, civil engineering and groundwork contractor in the East Midlands.

In 2005 Thomas Bow became a sister company to City Asphalt Ltd until August 2010, when the two companies merged and rebranded as Thomas Bow City Asphalt. The company is now involved in the Highways Maintenance area.

In 2017, Thomas Bow City Asphalt was listed in the London Stock Exchange report identifying ‘1000 Companies to Inspire Britain’ and the Nottingham Post ‘Top 200 Businesses’ list. That year, Thomas Bow also celebrated its 150th anniversary in business. The firm held an event commemorating the anniversary attended by employees, former employees and local dignitaries.

The company is owned by the Bow family, and the current chairman and managing director is Alistair Bow, a sixth-generation member of the family. The other directors are Alex Gardner, Andrew Jackaman and John Allen.

== Major projects ==
- Wilford Power Station, the Raleigh Bicycle Company factory and Barclays Bank in Market Square, Nottingham.
- Rebuilt some buildings in Nottingham during World War II; such as, the bombed William Dixon & Co. factory and camouflaging the roof of the Royal Ordnance Factory.
- Rebuilt Newark's Ransome & Marles bearings factory which was damaged by an air raid on 7 March 1941, a day which became known as Newark's Black Friday.
- Donington Park racetrack, Birmingham Airport and the Lincoln Transport Hub.
