= Hadfields Limited =

- Trade name: Hadfields
- Formerly: Hadfield's Steel Foundry Company Limited
- Type: Public listed company until privatised 1967
- Industry: Steel
- Founded: 1869 in Sheffield, England
- Founder: Robert Hadfield (1831-1888)
- Headquarters: East Hecla Works, Attercliffe, Sheffield, United Kingdom
- Area served: International
- Key people: Robert Hadfield (1831-1888); Robert Abbott Hadfield (1858-1940); Derek Norton (1933-2008)
- Brands: Era, Heclon
- Owner: Robert Hadfield 1869-1888; Public listed company from 1888-1967; Dunford-Elliott 1968-1977; Lonrho 1977-1983

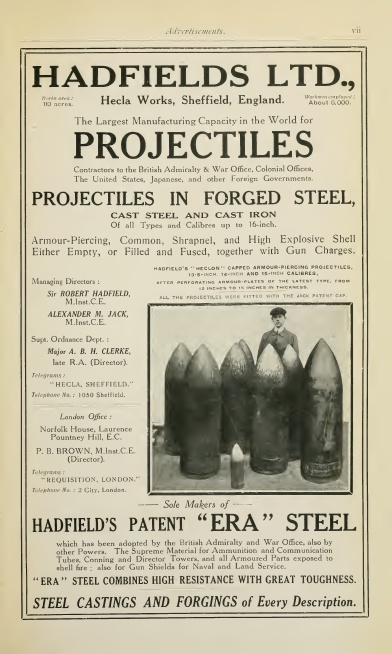
Advertisement in Brassey's Naval Annual 1915 presenting Hadfield's manufacture of artillery shells and their patented "ERA" steel

Hadfields Limited of Hecla and East Hecla Sheffield, Yorkshire was a British manufacturer of special steels in particular manganese alloys (which were discovered by the founder's son and often known as Hadfield steel) and the manufacture of steel castings.

There was a very heavy involvement in the armaments industry, in the production of shells and armour plate steel.

In 1977 Hadfields became part of Tiny Rowland's Lonrho. The over-capacity of Britain's steel industry forced the closure of the Leeds Road plant in June 1981 and the East Hecla workforce was much reduced. Lonrho finally closed the last part of Hadfields in 1983 receiving compensation from GKN and the British Steel Corporation. Most of the site is now covered by Meadowhall Shopping Centre.

== History ==
Robert Hadfield (c.1831-20 March 1888) who died aged 57 after a long illness, belonged to a family with close links to steel makers (Brown's) and Sheffield's cutlery industry. Hadfield served his apprenticeship with edge tool firm John Sorby & Sons of Attercliffe. After a period as Attercliffe's rate collector he joined a steel wire making business associated with Sorby's. Following the death of his wire-maker partner, Shipman, Hadfield began in 1869 his own steel casting business on a site close by the River Don, off Newhall Road, Attercliffe. Success was assured when he became able to produce materials and castings for shells which previously had to be imported from France. By the time of his death in 1888 it was estimated there were more than 1,500,000 Hadfield's cast steel wheels and axles in daily use all over the world and his firm could make castings weighing up to 16,000 lb (7 t). He was able to produce cast steel of a strength previously provided only by forged steel. Hadfield left the business to his two daughters and his son, Robert Abbott Hadfield. In compliance with his will his business was transferred to a limited liability company incorporated the year of his death and shares offered to the general public. The prospectus for the new company described its castings as unrivalled and of a modern and progressive type and listed these products:

- Wheels, axles, cylinders and other machinery used for railways, tramways, collieries, shipbuilding, engineering and other purposes
- Steel shells for war purposes

Hadfield's became a public listed company with Robert Abbott Hadfield its managing director and chairman of its board of directors.

=== Hadfield's Steel Foundry Company Limited ===
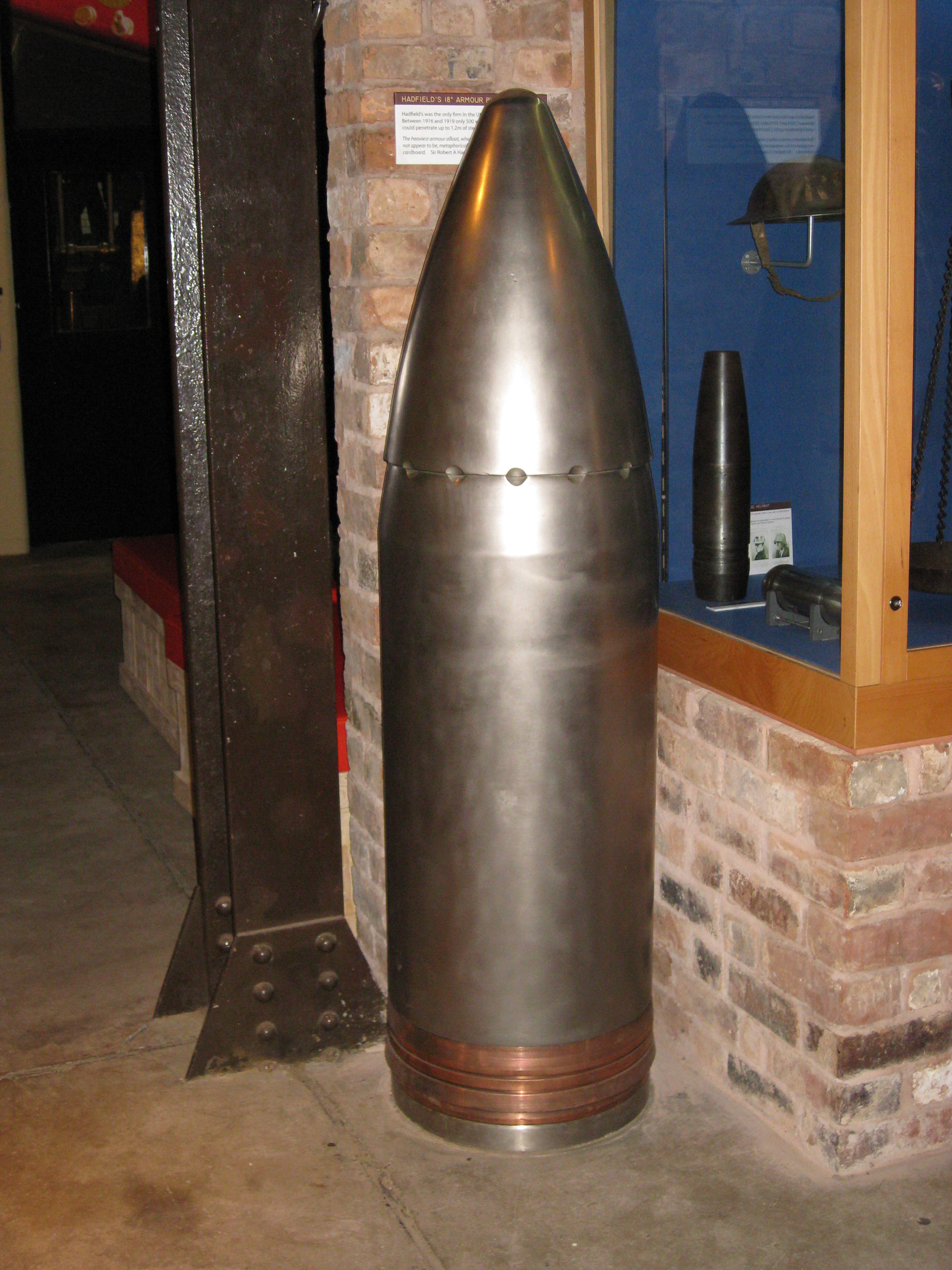
Hadfield's 18 inch armour-piercing shell (1916-9)

Sir Robert Abbott Hadfield (1858–1940), a metallurgist, discoverer in 1882 of manganese steel and inventor of silicon steel succeeded his father when he died in 1888. Hadfields' Era manganese steel, the first commercial austenitic steel and essentially soft, was very tough because attempting to cut or shape the surface made the alloy intensely hard. Initially it was used for dredgers, for pins, bushes, bucket lips all subject to intense wear from sand. Once rolling stock reached higher speeds and increased weight Era had to be used for steel points and crossings for railways and tramways.

By the mid-1890s work was at high levels and Hadfield's needed to expand from their restricted site. They bought 90 acres (36 ha) of land in Tinsley. On this they built a new works, known as East Hecla Works which opened in 1897. The old Hecla Works was turned over to the manufacture of projectiles.

In 1911 Hadfield's was believed to employ more workmen than any other business in Sheffield and was "largely engaged in the production of war material." Their 14 in (356 mm) Heclon armour piercing shot weighing almost 1,700 lb (771 kg) could perforate 12 in (305 mm) of Krupp cemented armour plate without shattering. Hadfield's shells had a patent cap which gave their projectiles very high ballistic qualities. Their Era cast steel was used in the armoured structures in warships. Hadfield's foundry was by this time some 1,100 ft (335 m) long and covered near 7 acres (2.8 ha).

=== Hadfields Limited ===
A special meeting of shareholders following their AGM on 17 March 1913 renamed Hadfield's Steel Foundry Company Limited Hadfields Limited

"Herr Krupp von Bohlen und Halbach while in Sheffield will visit Hadfields, Vickers, Cammells and Brown's works" —News item June 1914. His host at Sheffield, Sir Robert Hadfield, spoke of the satisfaction of all who knew the excellent relations prevailing between England and Germany. Herr Krupp responded that Germans would always remember Sheffield was the home of cast steel.

== Post World War I ==
By 1920 Hadfields Limited's own freehold land had expanded to around 220 acres (890,000 m^{2}) in and around Sheffield. About 45 acres (180,000 m^{2}) were covered with works including the largest steel foundries in Great Britain. Hadfields manufactured steel castings and forgings also from manganese steel and other steel alloys. They manufactured special steels for motor-cars and aeroplanes, projectiles and other war materiel, crushing machinery, tramway track work and many other steel and engineering products.

Their plant was capable of producing 150,000 to 200,000 tons of high-grade and special steels each year by the Hadfield system and by employment of open-hearth furnaces (acid and basic), crucible and electric furnaces and many other substantial items.

Plant included some 300 electric steam and other overhead cranes, 21 large and small locomotives, more than 21 miles of railway, 250 heating furnaces and hydraulic forging presses up to about 2,000 tons capacity.

In December 1919 and January 1920 Hadfields agreed with Harper Bean Limited that each would take a holding of the other's shares to the value of £250,000. Harper Bean planned to be producing 50,000 cars per annum by 1923. Similar arrangements were entered into with Henry Barlow Sanford and with John Baker and Co (Rotherham).

== 1960s rationalisation ==
The Industrial Reorganisation Corporation

There was a renationalisation of the steel industry in July 1967 but Hadfields escaped that.

It was seen in the mid-1960s that some rationalisation was needed within the Sheffield steel industry, particularly steel founding. With respect to this Hadfields Limited split into separate divisions, forging, casting and other works. Similar moves were taking place at Samuel Osborn & Company, Jessop Saville & Company and Edgar Allen and Company.

The intention was to merge the foundry interests of the four companies to form one large steel foundry with the capability of making castings from a few ounces to 40 tons, with only English Steel Corporation's Grimesthorpe foundry in the city able to make larger. As negotiations were taking place the deal fell through leaving Osborn's and Hadfield's to merge, with the foundry being located on Hadfield's East Hecla (Vulcan Road) site. Edgar Allen's purchased Jessop's, relocating Jessop's special alloy (medium frequency) melting on Edgar's Sheffield Road site and the 3-ton electric furnace at their Imperial Steel Works melting shop.

However a surprise bid for Osborn Hadfields Limited was announced on 24 October 1967 from Dunford & Elliott also of Sheffield and much smaller than Hadfields and Dunford's takeover of Hadfields was completed in December 1967 with effect from October 1967. Samuel Osborn retained the foundry interests.

Hadfields and its subsidiaries, bringing with them substantial losses, joined Dunford & Elliott (Sheffield) Limited's group as Dunford Hadfields Limited as of December 1967 and from 1977, once again Hadfields, it was part of Tiny Rowland's Lonrho.

The over-capacity of Britain's steel industry forced 1800 employees to be made redundant from Hadfields' Leeds Road plant in June 1981 and the East Hecla workforce much reduced. Lonrho finally closed the last part of Hadfields in 1983 receiving compensation from GKN and the British Steel Corporation.

== Redevelopment ==
This site is now mainly covered by the Meadowhall Shopping Centre, the old factory being flattened in the early 1980s as part of the regeneration of the East end of Sheffield following the closure of many of the local factories in the 1970s
