= Pollard Ball and Roller Bearing Company =

Former manufacturing company in West Yorkshire, England

Pollard Ball and Roller Bearing Company with its headquarters at Ferrybridge, West Yorkshire was a manufacturer of ball and roller bearings founded by John King. Formerly it had been known as Ferrybridge Industries and was originally a small family motor repair firm, Whitehouse Motor Industries, Ford dealers. Ferrybridge owned Pollard Bearings Limited.

== International ==
Subsidiaries were established in France, Canada and USA. In 1964, 30 percent of the trade was direct with the motor industry in Germany, Italy, France, Sweden, and the US.

== Industrial Reorganisation Corporation ==
In May 1969 government pressure exerted through the Industrial Reorganisation Corporation required the sale of all the capital of Pollard to Ransome & Marles. The grounds for the pressure were given to be as follows:

the ball bearing industry was a large sector of engineering technology and an essential input into the motor and aircraft industries;
when compared with other developed countries the British industry was fragmented;
there was a possibly of a merger of Sweden's Skefko and Ransome & Marles. SKF dominates the market in European countries.
There would be advantages of scale.
Ransome & Marles was the leading British owned company.
