= John King, Baron King of Wartnaby =

British economist (1917–2005)

The Right Honourable The Lord King of Wartnaby
- Portrait by Nick Sinclair, 1992

Member of the House of Lords
- Lord Temporal
- Life peerage 15 July 1983 – 12 July 2005

Personal details
- Born: 29 August 1917 Brentford, Greater London, England
- Died: 12 July 2005 (aged 87) Wartnaby, Leicestershire, England
- Spouse(s): Lorna Sykes (m. 1941; died 1969) Isabel Monckton (m. 1970)

John Leonard King, Baron King of Wartnaby (29 August 1917 – 12 July 2005) was a British businessman, who was noted for leading British Airways. He was also directly involved with the "dirty tricks" campaign waged by British Airways against Virgin Atlantic.

== Early life and career ==
King was born in Brentford, Middlesex. His father, Albert John King, had fought in the First World War, and later worked as a postman; his Irish-born mother, Kathleen King, worked as a seamstress. He was the second of four children. He was reared on a small property attached to a public house in Dunsfold, Surrey. He left school in 1929 at the age of 12 without qualifications and started work in a local factory which produced vacuum cleaners, where his work included machining clamping stays, earning him the nickname "Clamping Stay King".

His next job was with local businessman Arthur Sykes, as a car salesman (with duties including re-possessing cars from people who had failed to make the necessary payments) before setting up his own taxi business and acquiring a Ford cars sub-agency and naming it Whitehouse Motors. When the Second World War broke out, the motor business folded, but by then King had diversified into more general engineering work and so prospered from defence contracts and making parts for aircraft. He benefited hugely from War Ministry contracts and was able to use rare American machine tools that he acquired under the Lend Lease programme.

After the war King, moved to Canada for a time, before returning to England and building a factory on wasteland in Ferrybridge, West Riding of Yorkshire to establish Ferrybridge Industries. After renaming it the Pollard Ball and Roller Bearing Company and producing millions of ball bearings per year, it grew to become a major operation spanning several continents (the third-largest ball-bearing business in the UK). After being forced to merge the business with another manufacturer, Ransome & Marles, as part of a government reorganisation of the ball bearing business, King sold it for £10m in 1968, netting some £3m personally.

He became Chairman of Dennis Specialist Vehicles in 1970, and Babcock International in 1972. Babcock was acquired by FKI Electricals for £415 million in August 1987. King, Babcock chairman since 1972, became chairman of the new combined company, called FKI Babcock. He was made Knight Bachelor in the 1979 New Year Honours, and appointed Chairman of the National Enterprise Board in 1980 and, famously, taking over as head of British Airways (BA).

== British Airways ==
Dubbed "Mrs. Thatcher's favourite businessman" he was chosen to prepare the loss-making nationalised flag carrier for privatisation. King joined British Airways in 1981 when the airline was losing in excess of £140m a year. By 1989, the airline was making a pre-tax profit of £268m. Some of King's major changes at the airline included removing 22,000 staff members, hiring Colin Marshall as CEO in 1983, removing older aircraft from the fleet, purchasing more modern and efficient airliners, and axing unprofitable routes. Within two years King had replaced over half of the BA board with his own appointees. When BA was privatised in 1987, the initial share offering was 11 times oversubscribed. His compensation as chairman rose from about £250,000 in 1988 to £669,350 (including a £220,000 bonus) in 1991. King was created a life peer as Baron King of Wartnaby, in the County of Leicestershire on 15 July 1983.

Lord King recognised the importance of Concorde to British Airways. In its early years of service with BA, Concorde lost the carrier money and attracted criticism from the press as a white elephant. BA used Concorde to win business customers from transatlantic competitors by guaranteeing a certain number of Concorde upgrades in return for corporate accounts with the airline.

== Virgin Atlantic and the "Dirty Tricks" Scandal ==
Around the same time, British Airways was witnessing the emergence of a rival, Richard Branson's Virgin Atlantic, which began with one route and one Boeing 747 in 1984, and was emerging as a serious threat on some of BA's most lucrative routes. Following a highly publicised mercy mission to Iraq to fly home hostages who had been held by Saddam Hussein in 1991, King is reported to have told Marshall and his PA Director David Burnside to "do something about Branson".

This began the campaign of "dirty tricks", for which Branson sued King and BA for libel in 1992. King countersued Branson with the case scheduled for trial in 1993. However, it was settled out of court, with BA paying damages to Branson of £500,000 and a further £110,000 to his airline; further, BA paid legal fees of up to £3 million.

== Later career ==
King stepped down from his BA leadership role in 1993, but remained BA president emeritus. His interests included directorships at the Daily Telegraph, Spectator, headhunting company Norman Broadbent, and engineering firm Short Brothers.

== Marriages and children ==
King was married twice. His first wife was Lorna Sykes (daughter of his first boss, Arthur Sykes, and sister-in-law of John Poulson) in 1941. The couple remained married until her death from cancer in 1969. King remarried in 1970 to Isabel Cynthia Monckton, daughter of the 8th Viscount Galway.

== Personal life ==
King held the rank of MFH (Master of Foxhounds) with the Belvoir and Badsworth hunts and was also Chairman of the Lord King XI cricket team.

He and wife Lorna both learned to fly and would use an aircraft to tour the UK.

Lord King kept a flat in London for many years, in Eaton Square, and during his time running British Airways he lived there during the week. At weekends, he travelled north to his country estate, Friars Well Estate, in Wartnaby near Melton Mowbray in the county of Leicestershire. He also had a house in Scotland, close to the River Naver.

== Arms ==
Coat of arms of John King, Baron King of Wartnaby
Coronet A Coronet of a Baron Crest An Otter sejant Vert holding in the dexter paw a Sceptre Or Escutcheon Or five Piles two reversed Vert each charge with an Acorn slipped of the field Supporters On either side a Horse reguardant Sable unguled Or in the mouth of each a Sprig of Oak Vert fructed Or Motto La Fortune Passe Par Tout (The vicissitudes of fortune are common to all)

Business positions
Preceded by Sir Ross Stainton	Chairman of British Airways; February 1981 – February 1993	Succeeded by Sir Colin Marshall
Preceded by Sir Hector McNeil	Chairman of Babcock International Group plc January 1972 (Babcock & Wilcox) – July 1994	Succeeded by John Parker
