= Edgar Allen and Company =

Edgar Allen and Company was a steel maker and engineer, which from the late 19th century was based at Imperial Steel Works, Tinsley, Sheffield, South Yorkshire. The site was bounded by Sheffield Road, Vulcan Road and the Sheffield District Railway to which it was connected.

== Imperial Steel Works ==
The site was the home of the foundry and the fabrication shops of the company, the steel warehousing and magnet shops being on the opposite side of Sheffield Road and the later established engineers tools and railway trackwork sections being located adjacent to Shepcote Lane, on a narrow strip of land between that road and the Sheffield Canal.

The Melting Shop used metal supplied from two cupola furnaces to feed a pair of Tropenas converters to supply metals to the foundry. These were a nominal 3 tons capacity each. The Tropenas converters were similar to Bessemer process furnaces except that the air was blown across the surface of the molten metal from tuyères on the side of the vessel rather than the bottom.

The Electric Melting Shop was home to two Héroult electric arc furnaces, the first installed in 1910, the other in 1912 still working when the site closed. This was the first application of electric arc furnaces in Sheffield. These were a nominal 5 tons capacity and provided metal for the foundry and to ingot production for forging. The company also offered a "remelting" service for special alloy producers, in particular magnet alloys and stainless steels.

The Foundry comprised moulding shops, casting bays, fettling shops and machine shops, all suitable for castings up to three tons weight. Although larger castings were made by mixing metal from all the sources these were machined and finished outside. The remainder of the site comprised the Fabrication Shops, three bays laid out for the production of welded fabrications and heat exchangers. Following World War II a new laboratory block was added adjacent to the Sheffield Road entrance. This comprised facilities for Chemical Analysis, Physical Testing, Non-Destructive Testing, Mechanical Testing and Metallography. This facility also had its own small machine shop, for making mechanical test pieces, and a reference library / conference facility.

On the Sheffield Road site, a narrow, triangular section of land between Sheffield Road and the Sheffield to Doncaster railway line, opposite the Imperial site was at its apex the Magnet Dept, the steel heat treatment and warehousing section and, opening in 1927, the first high frequency steel melting plant in the country. Fronting Sheffield Road were the main company offices. A memorial to those workers from the company who lost their lives in World War I was fixed to the wall adjacent to the main doors.

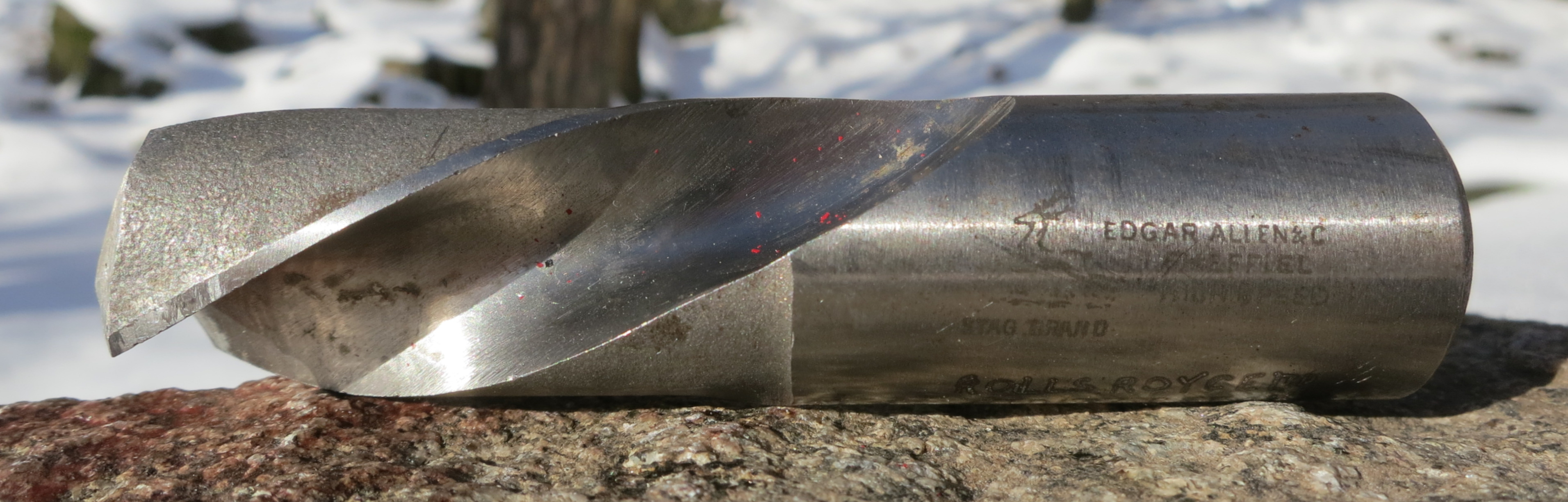
1980s "Stag" brand drill bit by Edgar Allen Tools

The third section of the works was the Shepcote Lane site, between that road and the Sheffield Canal. This was the site used by Edgar Allen Tools, makers of "Stag" brand engineers cutting tools, and the layout facilities of the railway trackwork department, which became Edgar Allen Engineering, makers of some of the most complex railway crossings in the country including the major crossing built for the east end of Newcastle Central station where the tracks of the East Coast Main Line crossed the local network after leaving the station platforms. This was constructed in sections in Sheffield and re-assembled on site. With track rationalisation this crossing was simplified using a new configuration. In connection with EA Foundry (and their Non-Destructive Testing facility to ensure quality) they were the first in Britain to develop cast manganese high speed main line turnouts.

== 1960s Rationalisation ==
It was seen in the mid-1960s that some rationalisation was needed within the Sheffield steel industry, particularly steel founding. With respect to this Edgar Allen split into separate companies: EA Foundry, EA Steels, EA Engineering, and with one of its subsidiaries, Aerex Limited, EA Aerex. Similar moves were taking place at Samuel Osborn & Company, Jessop Saville & Company and Hadfields Limited.

The intention was to merge the foundry interests of the four companies to form one large steel foundry with the capability of making castings from a few ounces to 40 tons, with only English Steel Corporation's Grimesthorpe foundry in the city able to make larger. As negotiations were taking place the deal fell through leaving Osborn's and Hadfield's to merge, with the foundry being located on Hadfield's East Hecla (Vulcan Road) site, and Edgar Allen's to purchase Jessop's, relocating Jessop's special alloy (medium frequency) melting on Edgar's Sheffield Road site and the 3-ton electric furnace at one end of the Tropenas Melting Shop.

== Closure ==
The Imperial works site closed in January 1989 with the work being transferred to another foundry within the group. The site was cleared and was set to become the 'leisure' part of the Meadowhall Shopping Centre. The original plans saw this as a Tivoli Gardens themed area of amusements and catering outlets. This was never built and a few years later it was revamped on a Bourbon Street theme. Again this never got off the drawing board and the land remains as an overflow car park for the shopping centre, used only at Christmas and the January sales period.

The Sheffield Road site was also closed at the same time, cleared and now houses a budget price hotel and a catering outlet. This left only part of the Shepcote Lane site in operation.

Edgar Allen Engineering Limited, the suppliers of cast manganese trackwork for railway and tramway systems throughout the world, including the Sheffield Supertram system became part of the Balfour Beatty group in the 1990s. In February 2010 it was announced that the facilities in Sheffield would close in May 2010 with the work being transferred to other company facilities in Nottingham or Leeds, however the site continues to exist under the new owners - Progress Rail Services UK Limited.

== Subsidiary companies ==
There were several companies within the Edgar Allen group:

- Aerex Limited of Chesterfield, (which amalgamated with the fabrication interests of the parent company to form Edgar Allen Aerex), industrial fan makers.
- British Rema Manufacturing, Sheepbridge near Chesterfield.
- Hollow Drill Steel Company, specialist drills for shot-firing in coal mining and quarrying.
- Openshaw Forge, Manchester, steel forgings.
- Buell Limited, rotary drum dryers.

== Allen's philanthropy ==
The name of William Edgar Allen (1837-1915) was given to a physiotherapy clinic, The Edgar Allen Institute which he founded in Sheffield. The gift of money which founded the institute was not without its advantages to his company where he believed that his workers would benefit from physiotherapy treatments to aid their recovery and so help in a speedy return to work. The clinic survives today although in new premises in Glossop Road again under the name the Edgar Allen Institute and is part of the facilities offered by the Royal Hallamshire Hospital.
