= Lincoln Transport Hub =

Transport interchange located in Lincoln city centre in Lincolnshire, England

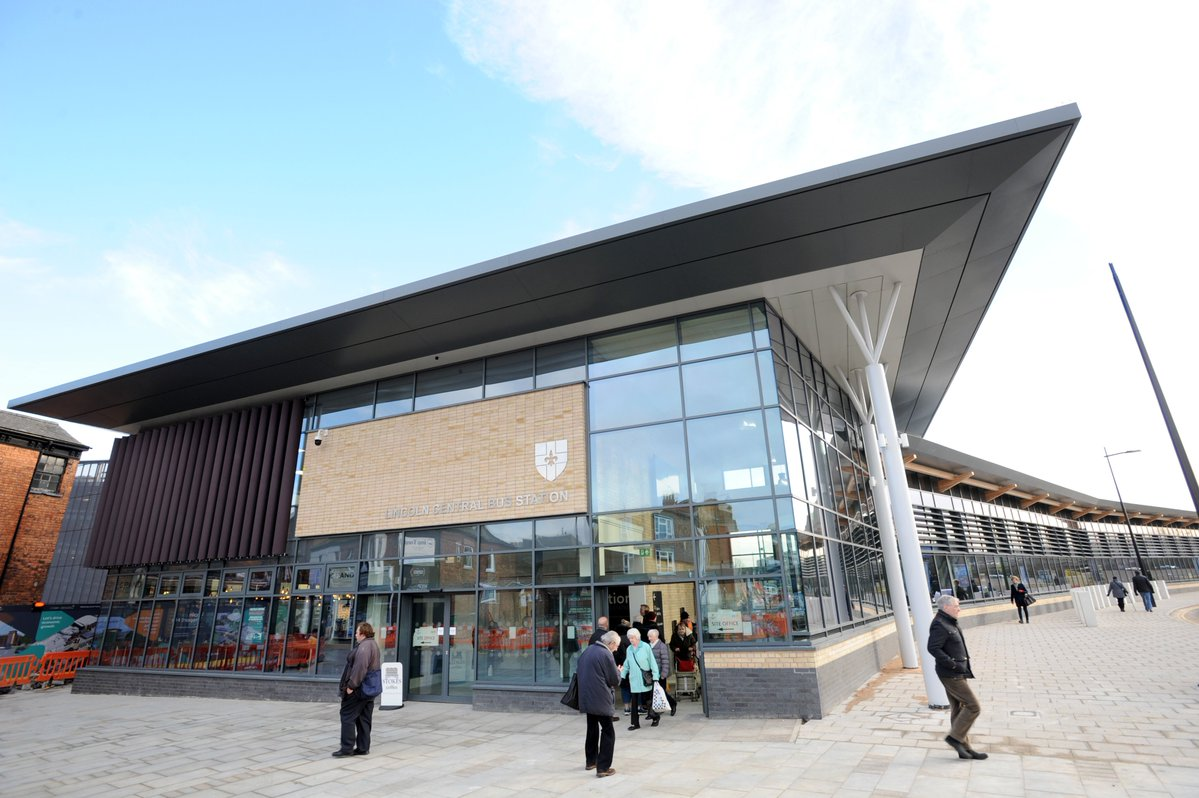
- Lincoln Central Bus Station

General information
- Location: St Mary's Street; Lincoln; England
- Coordinates: 53.2273°N 0.5375°W
- Owner: City of Lincoln Council
- Operator: East Midlands Railway (railway station)
- Bus routes: 1, 2, 3, 4, 5, 7, 8, 13, 14, 17, 18, 31/31X, 46, 53/53A, 100, 103, 105, 106, 107 "plus more".
- Bus stands: 15
- Bus operators: Stagecoach in Lincolnshire, TransLinc, Brylaine, Hunt's Travel, PC Coaches
- Connections: Lincoln railway station

Construction
- Parking: 1,000 spaces
- Cycle facilities: Yes
- Accessible: Yes

History
- Opened: November 2017 (car park); 28 January 2018 (bus station)

Passengers
- 2015: 7 million annually
Location

The Lincoln Transport Hub is a transport interchange located in Lincoln city centre in Lincolnshire, England. It connects Lincoln railway station with the Central Bus Station across a pedestrianised plaza on St Mary's Street. There is also a 1,000-space multi-storey car park. Lincoln Transport Hub was scheduled to open in December 2017, however it was decided that the accompanying car park (originally planned to open in January 2018) should be opened first and swapped the opening schedule. The new bus station opened on 28 January 2018.

== History ==
=== Lincoln City Bus Station ===
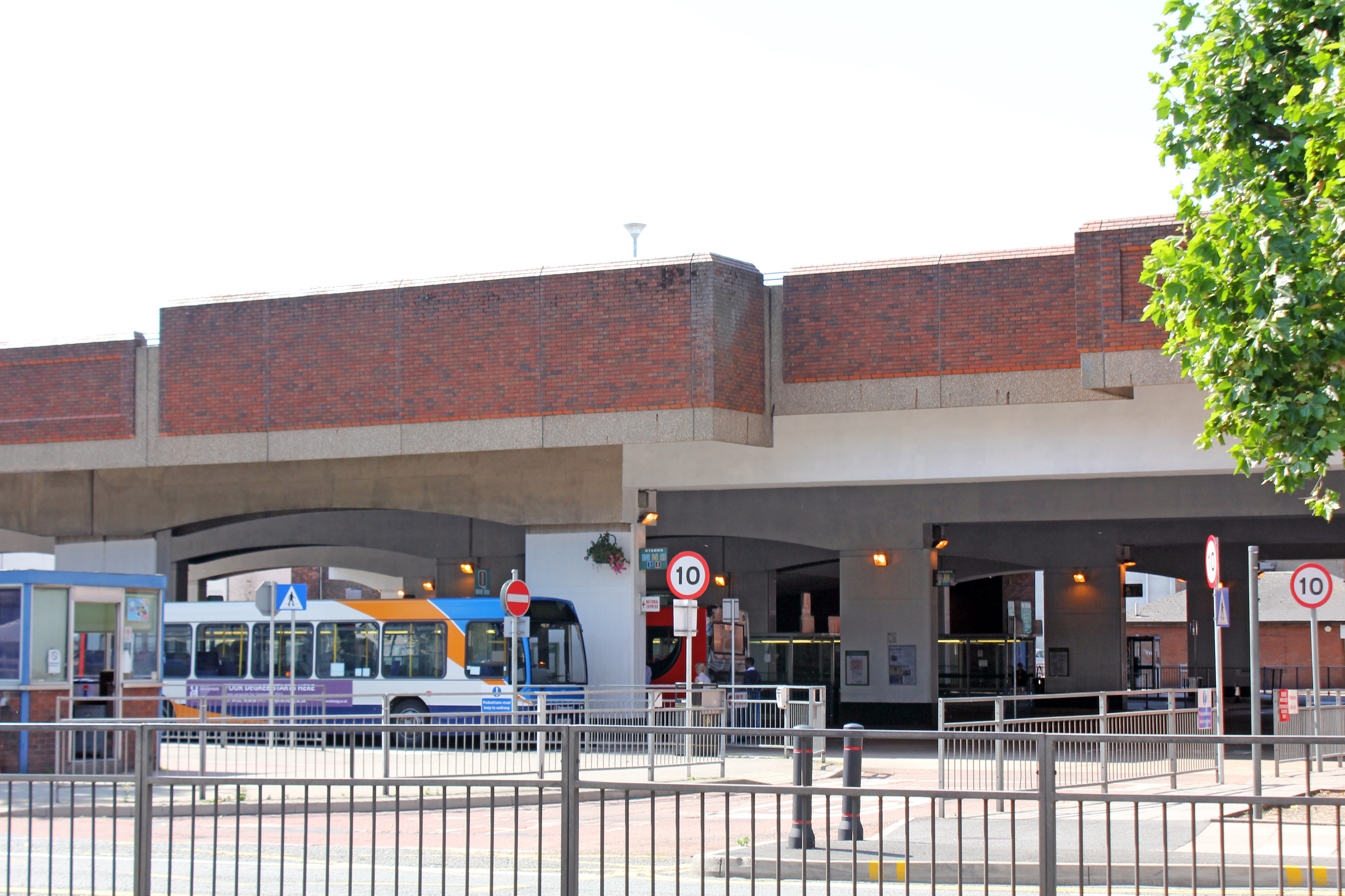
Lincoln City bus station, demolished 2016

The Lincoln Transport Hub is built on land formerly occupied by the Grand Hotel and Norman Street, which were adjacent to the 1970-built Lincoln City bus station, the previous main bus service hub in the city.

The chief operator at the time of closure was Stagecoach in Lincolnshire, who run city- and county-wide services, with destinations including Boston, Grantham, Grimsby, Scunthorpe and Skegness. Additional city services are provided by PC Coaches. Other Interconnect and CallConnect services are run by InterConnect. National Express Coaches also operate from Lincoln to Victoria coach station in London and to Westward Ho! in Devon. There is a weekly service from Bourne operated by Kimes. With the closure of Lincoln City Bus Station, these services were transferred to a temporary bus station off Tentercroft Street.

In 2012, planning permission was granted for Lincolnshire Co-operative Society to redevelop the bus station site as part of a development to be known as Lindongate; it was later renamed to the Lincoln Transport Hub redevelopment. A new bus station would be included in the development, closer to the railway station.

Lincoln City Bus Station closed at midnight on 27 August 2016. The following day, services transferred to a temporary bus station located in a former car park off Tentercroft Street, half a mile to the south. In October 2016, an archaeological dig commenced on the site, recovering a large horde of 12th and 13th century pottery and other artefacts. Demolition of the bus station then commenced on 12 November 2016 and was completed by January 2017.

=== Railway station ===
The station buildings were designed in 1848 by John Henry Taylor of London for the Great Northern Railway company. It is built in a Tudor revival style of yellow brick, with stone dressings and slate roofs, with 6 ridge and 8 side wall stacks.

Lincoln railway station remained open and operational with little disruption throughout the Lincoln Transport Hub works - although pedestrian diversion routes were put in place to allow the works to be carried out.

=== Car parks ===
The site was also previously occupied by 2 car parks (one run by City of Lincoln Council (CoLC), the other NCP). The CoLC car park was located above the old bus station and a still existing Lincolnshire Co-Op department store and was accessed via a ramp 100yds north to the bus station entrance on Broadway (Northbound). The car park run by NCP was located in the middle of a roundabout in st Mary's street to the south of the old bus station. Across both of these car parks there were approximately 100 parking bays. The vast majority of the CoLC car park was removed during the demolition of the old bus station however the small portion above the Co-Op store remains accessible via the original ramp and is now used for staff parking only. The NCP car park was completely removed to make way for the new bus station.

== Lincoln Transport Hub ==
Construction of the new bus station and multi-storey car park at Lincoln Transport Hub commenced in January 2017, following the demolition of Lincoln City Bus Station, and was scheduled to be completed and opened by December 2017. The Transport hub consists of a new bus station connected to the existing railway station by a pedestrianised plaza on St Mary's Street, with a new multi-story car park adjacent to the bus station. The total cost of the project is estimated to be around £30 million.

=== Lincoln Central Bus Station ===
The new fifteen-stand bus station, located next to the site of the former bus station, has interactive touch-screen timetables, automated bay doors, a cafe and large screens showing departure times for both buses and trains. The bus station also has specialist accessible facilities for elderly and disabled customers. Lincoln Central Bus Station officially opened on 28 January 2018, seeing services transferred from the temporary bus station off Tentercroft Street.

With the opening of the new bus station, Stagecoach introduced their simplibus scheme to Lincoln, seeing many services renumbered (e.g. service 44 was renumbered simply to 4).

=== Railway station ===
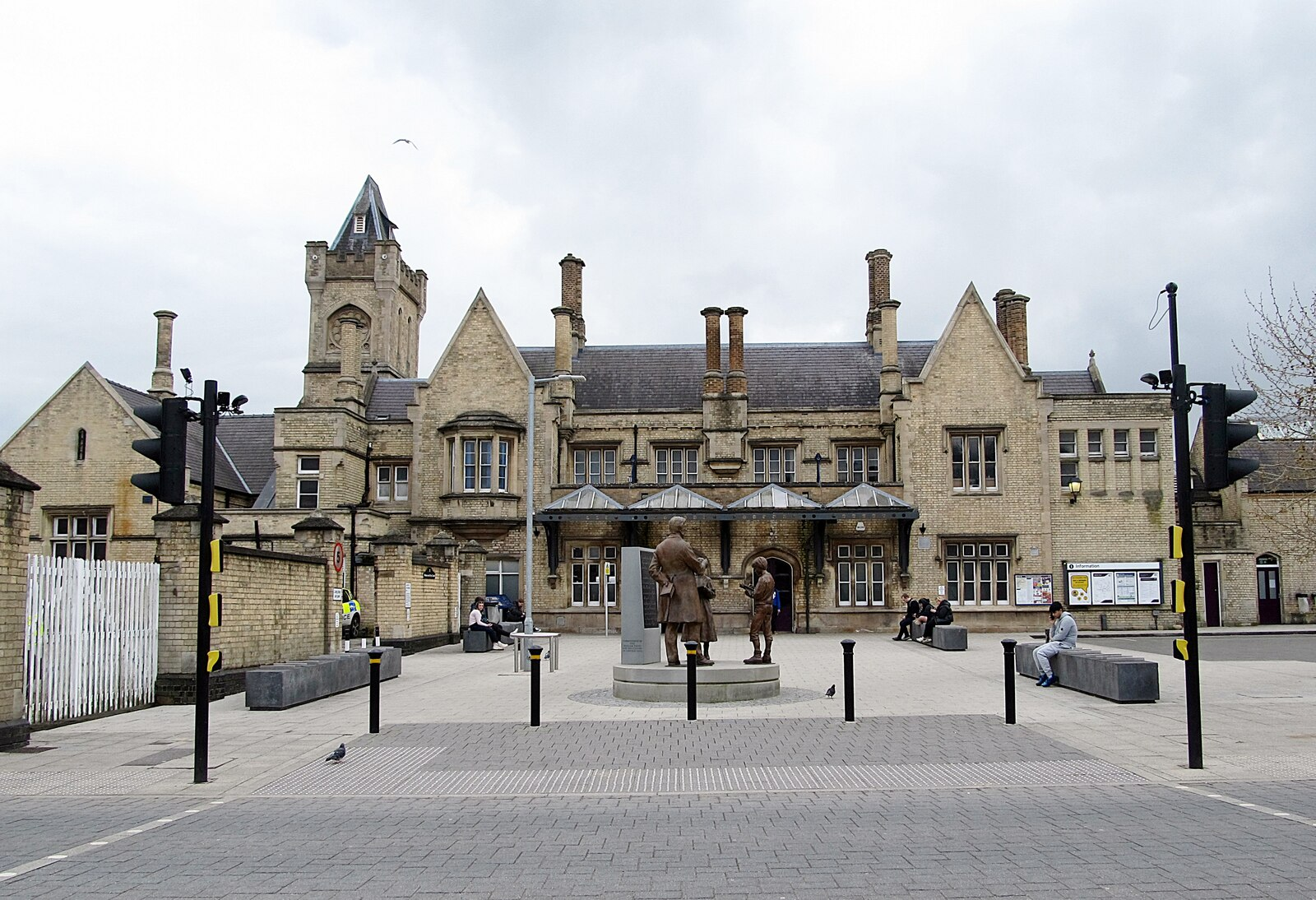
Entrance to Lincoln railway station

Lincoln railway station serves the city of Lincoln in Lincolnshire, England. The station is owned by Network Rail and managed by East Midlands Railway. EMR provide services along with Northern Trains and London North Eastern Railway.

A new pedestrian plaza connects the railway station to the bus station, providing easier connections between trains and buses and better access to the city centre.

There are also plans for improvements to the railway station itself, alongside the construction of a new footbridge over the railway line from Tentercroft Street into the city centre to increase the connectivity of the city centre on foot and by cycle.

=== Car park ===
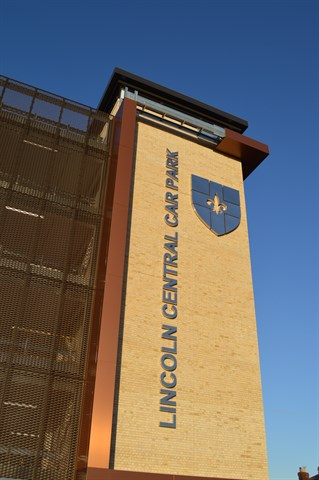
Lincoln Central Car Park

The site of the former bus station is now occupied by a new 1,000-space multi-storey car park, which was completed in early November 2017. The car park was opened in phases throughout November and December 2017 - being partially open just in time for Lincoln Christmas Market - and is now fully operational.
