= Martin Broughton =

British businessman (born 1947)

Sir Martin Broughton

Chairman of British Airways
- In office July 2004 – December 2013
- Preceded by: Colin Marshall, Baron Marshall of Knightsbridge
- Succeeded by: Keith Williams

Chairman of Liverpool Football Club
- In office 10 April 2010 – 13 October 2010
- Preceded by: Tom Hicks & George N. Gillett, Jr.
- Succeeded by: Tom Werner

Personal details
- Born: Martin Faulkner Broughton; 15 April 1947 (age 78) London, England
- Spouse: Lady Jocelyn Broughton (m. 1974)
- Children: 2
- Education: Westminster City School
- Profession: Businessman

Sir Martin Faulkner Broughton (born 15 April 1947) is a British businessman and deputy chairman of International Airlines Group. Formed in January 2011, IAG is the parent company of British Airways, Iberia and Vueling. It is a Spanish registered company with shares traded on the London Stock Exchange and Spanish Stock Exchanges. The corporate head office for IAG is in London, UK. He is also a Managing Partner at Sports Investment Partners and chairman of the sports virtual advertising company Supponor. He is a former chairman of Liverpool Football Club and also served as President of the Confederation of British Industry.

== Former career ==
Broughton joined British American Tobacco in 1971, becoming finance director in 1988, group chief executive and deputy chairman in 1993 and, ultimately, chairman and chief executive in 1998. In 1999, he also became an independent director of the British Horseracing Board, eventually succeeding Peter Savill as chairman in July 2004, at which point he retired from his roles at BAT.

Other directorships which Broughton has held include Wiggins Teape Group 1989–90 (as chairman), Eagle Star 1992–93 (as chairman) and Whitbread 1993–2000 (as non-executive director).

Broughton was knighted in the 2011 New Year Honours for services to business.

== British Airways chairman ==
Sir Martin joined the British Airways board as a non-executive director in May 2000 became the deputy chairman in November 2003, and became chairman in July 2004, serving until 2013.

== Liverpool F.C. chairman ==
On 16 April 2010, Liverpool F.C. appointed Martin Broughton to be their new chairman, despite the fact that he is a lifelong Chelsea supporter. Broughton was tasked with expediting the sale of the club to new owners.

On 6 October 2010, it was announced that Liverpool F.C. was to be sold to New England Sports Ventures (NESV) for £300 million; significantly lower than the amount being requested by the club's then owners, Tom Hicks and George Gillett. Broughton and the rest of the Liverpool F.C. board won the right to sell the club in a High Court case against Hicks and Gillett on 13 October 2010. The ruling was described by the fans' group Kop Faithful as "It's like a huge cloud has been lifted off us.....Hicks and Gillett leave with no legacy, apart from one of chaos". Broughton was succeeded as Liverpool F.C. chairman by Tom Werner after the takeover was completed by NESV.

== Tote Bid ==
In 2009, he spearheaded a private equity bid to buy The Tote as part of the government's privatisation process. The bid was made through an investment vehicle called Sports Investment Partners, with which his son Michael is also involved. The bid was one of five that successfully passed the first round of the process in January 2011.

== Chelsea FC bid ==
In 2022, he, along with Lewis Hamilton and Serena Williams, was involved in a bid to purchase Chelsea F.C. with global investment firm Centricus.

Business positions
Preceded by New company	Deputy Chairman of IAG; 2010–2016	Succeeded by
Preceded by Colin Marshall, Baron Marshall of Knightsbridge	Chairman of British Airways; 2004–2013	Succeeded by Keith Williams
Preceded by	Deputy Chairman of British Airways; 2003–2004	Succeeded by
