= Colin Marshall, Baron Marshall of Knightsbridge =

British businessman and politician

The Lord Marshall of Knightsbridge
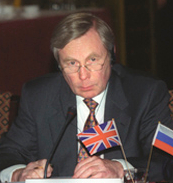
- Marshall in 2000

Member of the House of Lords
- Lord Temporal
- Life peerage 20 July 1998 – 5 July 2012

Personal details
- Born: 16 November 1933
- Died: 5 July 2012 (aged 78)
- Spouse: Janet Cracknell (m. 1958)
- Children: 2
- Education: University College School

Colin Marsh Marshall, Baron Marshall of Knightsbridge (16 November 1933 – 5 July 2012), was a British businessman and member of the House of Lords.

== Early and family life ==
Marshall was educated at University College School, an independent school for boys in Hampstead, a suburb of North London. He left school at the age of 16 and did not receive any further formal education.

In 1958, he married Janet Cracknell (later Lady Marshall), a fellow officer on the Orient Steam liner named the Ostrava. They had one child, Joanna, born in 1960. He then fathered a second child in the United States while employed by Hertz.

== Business career ==
His extensive experience in international business started in shipping in 1951 with Orient Steam Navigation Company, thereafter in vehicle rental and leasing for 23 years, initially with Hertz and then Avis, during which time he lived and worked in the United States, Canada, Mexico and the United Kingdom. In 1971, he was appointed Executive Vice President of Avis where he became President and Chief Executive in 1976, based in New York City. Following the take-over of Avis in 1979, he was appointed executive vice president of Norton Simon Inc., and Co-Chairman of Avis.

Marshall was hired by Lord King of Wartnaby in 1983 as CEO of British Airways (BA) and was instrumental in the reform of the company prior to its successful privatisation in 1987.

During the late 1980s and early 1990s, BA was witnessing the emergence of rival, Richard Branson's Virgin Atlantic. Virgin, which began with one route and one Boeing 747 in 1984, was beginning to emerge as a serious threat on some of BA's most lucrative routes. Following a highly publicised mercy mission to Iraq to fly home hostages of Saddam Hussein in 1991, King is reported to have told Marshall and his PR Director David Burnside to "do something about Branson"¹. This began the campaign of "dirty tricks", which ended in Branson suing King and BA for libel in 1992. King countersued Branson and the case went to trial in 1993. The court found in favour of Branson and Virgin, and ordered King and BA to pay damages to Branson of £500,000 and a further £110,000 to his airline, and legal fees of up to £3 million.

In the aftermath of the case, King was appointed president while Marshall was promoted to chairman, a role he combined with that of CEO. Bob Ayling became managing director. In 1996, Ayling became sole CEO, and his tenure was to be one of the most turbulent in BA's history. In 1997, he dropped the Union Flag design from BA's livery in favour of the unpopular ethnic art livery. In 1999, BA reported a 50% slump in profits – its worst since privatisation. In March 2000, Marshall removed Ayling from his position and in May announced Rod Eddington as his successor.

While helping to promote the government's Action 2000 campaign, which encouraged businesses to ensure that their computers recognised, interpreted, and processed the year 2000 date change, he was criticised for the contents of BA's own 1999 holiday brochures. These warned travellers: "We will not cover claims arising from equipment or any computer program failing to recognise, interpret or process any date changes for example the year 2000."

Marshall retired from the role of chairman of BA in July 2004 and was succeeded by Martin Broughton, former chairman of British American Tobacco.

From May 1996 to July 1998, Marshall was president of the Confederation of British Industry and chaired the CBI International Advisory Board. He was chairman of the board of Governors of Birkbeck, University of London, Vice-President of the Advertising Association; Member of the British American Business Council International Advisory Board; a Council Member of the Institute of Directors; and President of the Commonwealth Youth Exchange Council.

From June 1998 to July 2003, Marshall was also chairman of Invensys plc and chairman of The Royal Institute of International Affairs (Chatham House) from September 1999 to July 2003; Chairman of The Board of Trustees of The Conference Board Inc., from October 2000 to October 2003; member of the Board of HSBC Holdings plc from January 1993 to May 2004 and Chairman of the Queen's Club from 2007 to 2010.

He was appointed chairman of Pirelli UK plc in September 2003 and chairman of Nomura Securities on 1 October 2004. From 1 January 2005 to 1 January 2007, Lord Marshall was also Chairman of the National British Tourist Board VisitBritain.

In 1991, Marshall was the recipient of the Tony Jannus Award for his contributions to commercial aviation. Announced in the 1998 Birthday Honours he was created a life peer as Baron Marshall of Knightsbridge, of Knightsbridge in the City of Westminster on 20 July 1998.

In 1989, he was awarded an Honorary Degree (Doctor of Laws) by the University of Bath.

After his death from cancer, Birkbeck College constructed a memorial lecture in his name.

Business positions
Preceded by John King, Baron King of Wartnaby	Chairman of British Airways; 1993–2004	Succeeded by Martin Broughton
Preceded by	Deputy Chairman of British Airways; 1989–1993	Succeeded by
Preceded by Roy Watts (Group managing director)	CEO of British Airways; 1983–1995	Succeeded by Robert Ayling
