= Mushet steel =

Steel alloy type

Mushet steel, also known as Robert Mushet's Special Steel and, at the time of its use, self-hardening steel and air-hardening steel, is considered to be both the first tool steel and the first air-hardening steel. It was invented in 1868 by Robert Forester Mushet. Prior to Mushet steel, steel had to be quenched to harden it. It later led to the discovery of high-speed steel.

== Discovery ==
In 1868 Mushet was asked to produce on contract a new type of cast steel invented by a Glasgow manufacturer. The cast steel proved too brittle to be of use for cutting tools, but it spurred Mushet to experiment with various new alloys. A crucible steel made from tungsten ore and iron ore rich in manganese turned out to hold a cutting edge better than any carbon steel. An additional property, that was completely unexpected at the time, was that this new alloy would harden when left to cool in air after forging rather than needing to be quenched.

Mushet opted to keep the composition and production method of the new alloy a trade secret rather than patenting either. The ingredients were procured through intermediaries to conceal the relationship between the alloy and its ingredients. Mixing was done by Mushet and a few trusted men at his Dean Forest Steelworks with the ingredients being referred to by code words. The mixed ingredients were then shipped in barrels to Samuel Osborn & Company in Sheffield to be melted. While the composition of the alloy has been analyzed, the production process remains a secret.

== Properties ==
The chemical composition of Mushet steel varied; tungsten was the main alloying constituent, which ranged between 4 and 12%, while manganese (2–4%) and carbon (1.5–2.5%) were the secondary alloying constituents. Typical samples contain 9% tungsten, 2.5% manganese, and 1.85% carbon.

Mushet steel was harder than standard water quenched steel. It was found that Mushet steel could be best hardened by submitting it to an air blast after forging.

Mushet steel is non-magnetic.

== Significance ==
Mushet steel was primarily used in machine tools due to its ability to retain its hardness at high temperatures. In 1894, Frederick Winslow Taylor conducted machining comparison tests between Mushet steel and high carbon tool steel. He found that it could cut 41 to 47% faster on hard tire steel forgings and approximately 90% faster on mild steels. He also found that if a stream of water was used as a cutting fluid the cutting speed could be increased by 30%. After Taylor's tests results were published Mushet and other self-hardening steels became popular in machine tools. Prior to Taylor's tests Mushet steel was often just used to increase the time between regrinds, take larger cuts, or machine harder materials.

In 1899 and 1900, Taylor and Maunsel White were experimenting with hardening processes for Mushet steel and other self-hardening steels. They discovered if the steel is heated to near its melting point it creates a more durable metal. The metal will retain its hardness up to a red heat. This type of hardened self-hardening steel was the first high speed steel.
