= Samuel Osborn & Company =

Samuel Osborn and Company was a steelmaker and engineering tool manufacturer situated in Sheffield, South Yorkshire, England.

== Early life ==
Samuel Osborn junior was born in Sheffield in 1826, his father, also named Samuel, was a partner in the firm of Clark and Osborn, makers of pocket knives, razors, brushes and tortoiseshell combs.

Samuel junior did not follow in fathers footsteps but, leaving school at 15, he joined city drapers, T.B. & W Cockayne. After seven years he moved into the steel industry and joined toolmakers Thomas Ellin & Son later moving to Henry Russell & Company where he became a travelling salesman.

== Branching out on his own ==
In 1851 he set up on his own as a file manufacturer with premises in Broad Lane which were named Clyde Works. Within 5 years his company expanded and he rented a six - hole crucible furnace on Carver Street in the city centre, whilst only the following year he set up a tilt and forge in the Philadelphia district of the city, the new site being named Brookhill Works.

Osborn, like many other steel makers, showed an interest in his workers health and in particular two of the major illnesses which affected the file making industry: grinders asthma and lead poisoning. By 1864 he discovered an amalgam to replace the soft bed of lead in which the files were placed when being cut by hand. To reduce contact between his workers and lead he developed a file cutting machine although the craftsmen were opposed fearing job losses and a loss of quality in their product, neither being proved to be true.

== A new works and a new product ==
Osborn’s brother-in-law, William Fawcett, went into partnership with him in 1867 and new premises, in the Wicker area of the city, were bought the following year, these taking the name Clyde Steel & Iron Works, this becoming their main base of operations, the large Head Office of the company fronting the Wicker (these buildings still stand and house retail businesses at street level and, above, the Sheffield and District African-Caribbean Community Association).

In 1870 Osborn met Robert Forester Mushet, an iron master working in the Forest of Dean where he was producing a new alloy steel, considered far superior to crucible steel. Osborn bought the sole rights to manufacture 'R. Mushet's Special Steel' (R.M.S) and Mushet's two sons, Henry and Edward, moved up to Sheffield to oversee its manufacture. Business was booming with orders created by the Franco-Prussian War and the development of the railways.

== The fall and rise of the company ==
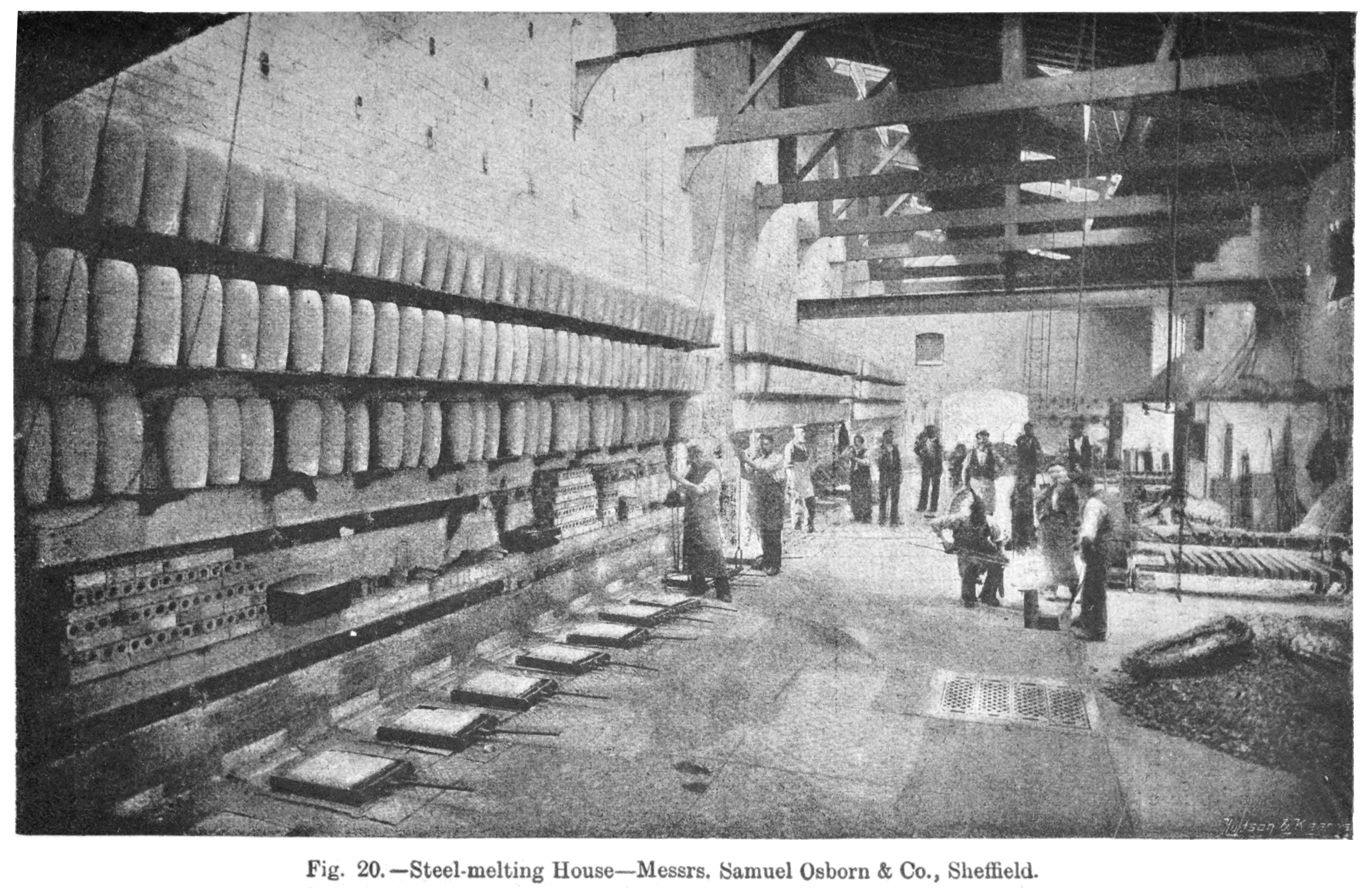
Samuel Osborn & Co's steel melting house in 1917

The bubble, however, burst and in 1874 Osborn was forced to file for liquidation.

With industrial development, a new market for Mushet’s Self Hardening Steel was found in America and the company opened a London Office. Taking on new partners and making connections in continental Europe he paid off all his creditors within ten years, the company being registered as the second largest private enterprise in the Sheffield & District Steel & Allied Trades Association. Expanding again, in 1885 he bought and expanded the Rutland Works, in the Neepsend area of the city.

Samuel Osborn died in 1891. The company, however, continued.

== Overseas development ==
Looking for sales potential from overseas the company set up a South African subsidiary in 1919. Based in the mining area outside Johannesburg, the new company was founded to market their parent company’s Sheffield made special steels for industry and, particularly, mining in South Africa.

== 1960s rationalisation ==
It was seen in the mid-1960s that some rationalisation was needed within the Sheffield steel industry, particularly steel founding. With respect to this Samuel Osborn & Company split into separate divisions. Similar moves were taking place at Edgar Allen and Company, Jessop Saville & Company and Hadfields Limited.

The intention was to merge the foundry interests of the four companies to form one large steel foundry with the capability of making castings from a few ounces to 40 tons, with only English Steel Corporation's Grimesthorpe foundry in the city able to make larger. As negotiations were taking place the deal fell through leaving Osborn and Hadfields to merge as Osborn Hadfields Steel Founders, with the foundry being located on Hadfield's East Hecla (Vulcan Road) site.

== Sources ==
- Internal company documentation relating to 1960's rationalisation.
