= Dirty Tricks (scandal) =

Business scandal

The "Dirty Tricks" scandal was a series of concerted campaigns by British Airways (BA) in the 1990s seeking to undermine their rival, Virgin Atlantic. Concerned by the prospect of an upcoming challenger, Lord King, Chairman of British Airways, told his chief executive "do something about Branson". The ensuing campaign involved BA representatives impersonating Virgin employees and calling up Virgin customers to try to get them to switch their flights to BA as well as hacking computers to gain access to insider information on Virgin's flights.

In 1992, Virgin Group chairman, Richard Branson sued BA, and the ensuing highly publicised court battle resulted in Virgin winning £3.51 million in compensation; the highest sum ever won for defamation.

== History ==
British Airways had traditionally been the flag carrier airline for the United Kingdom. Richard Branson started up Virgin Atlantic after being bumped from an American Airlines flight., and began competing directly with BA in its lucrative North American market. Virgin would use provocative marketing tactics to undermine BA in public view. Initially BA ignored Virgin, until 1990 when Virgin had used its planes to rescue British citizens during the Iraqi invasion of Kuwait and when Virgin started being awarded landing slots at London Heathrow Airport by BAA in direct competition with BA.

During a meeting at Gatwick Airport in which BA's chairman Lord King told his chief executive "do something about Branson", BA asked its helpline team to take on a campaign to undercut three of their British rivals: Virgin, Dan Air and Air Europe. The team accessed passenger records stored on the British Airways Booking System (BABS) which was used by Virgin, and provided the information to the ticketing team. They would also call Virgin's baggage handling teams impersonating Virgin staff to try to gain insider information from them. This was an example of social engineering. The operation was carried out in secret behind locked doors. The information would be placed in a brown envelope and passed to high-ranking members of BA. When they found out Virgin flights were delayed, BA staff would approach Virgin passengers and try to get them to switch to BA. BA staff also attempted to hack the rival agents' computers once flights had departed from gates. Once BA had the passenger information, they telephoned passengers to try to persuade them to switch their flight to BA by offering upgrades. Sometimes BA staff would call up Virgin's passengers and pretend to be from Virgin. The BA staff would lie that their Virgin flight was cancelled and suggest that they could fly BA instead.

Branson became aware of the campaign after a tip-off from a BA insider. In January 1991, Virgin complained to the European Commission about BA's tactics, which it dubbed "dirty tricks". In response, BA created "Operation Barbara" releasing a dossier detailing alleged negative aspects of Virgin's business. Using the claims in that, newspapers started to print false negative stories about Virgin. An example was accusing Virgin of having financial troubles and that claiming that Virgin had once been declined fuel credit by Shell. Branson wrote to BA demanding it investigate, however BA's deputy chairman Sir Michael Angus and CEO Sir Colin Marshall denied that their executives would have acted in such a way. BA also hired private investigators to search through the rubbish bins of Virgin staff and journalists who had spoken to Branson.

== Court case ==
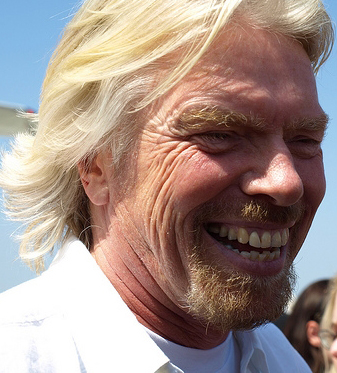
Virgin boss Richard Branson gave the money awarded to his staff

In March 1992, Virgin sued BA for libel at the High Court of England and Wales after Lord King claimed Virgin were just seeking publicity following the claims of "Operation Barbara". BA counter-sued claiming that Branson's accusations of "dirty tricks" were baseless. The case was set to be heard in January 1993. The British press had dubbed the upcoming case as "The Mother of All Libel Battles". Branson stated he had to sell his Virgin Records business for $1 billion in order to pay for the lawsuit, something which he said he wept at having to do.

A month prior to the case, following disclosure of documents that supported Virgin's claims, Branson and Lord King met and agreed to settle the case on the first day. BA's public relations consultant filed a motion with the court to have his name struck off the agreed statement. Virgin's barrister George Carman argued against it and the judge dismissed the motion but allowed the consultant to file his own statement.

The court ruled BA and Lord King had to release a joint statement apologising for the "dirty tricks" campaign. The judge also ruled that BA would have to pay Virgin's legal costs of £3 million. He also ruled that BA had to pay £500,000 in damages to Branson and £110,000 to Virgin Atlantic. Branson distributed the winnings to his staff which he called the "BA Bonus". At the time, the award was the largest libel settlement in British legal history.

== Virgin Cola ==
A similar "dirty tricks" campaign was run by The Coca-Cola Company against Virgin and their Virgin Cola product. Originally Coca-Cola did not treat Virgin as a serious competitor but when Virgin started outselling Coke in the United Kingdom and entered the American market, Coke realised they needed to do something. At the suggestion of a British Coca-Cola executive, Coke assembled "SWAT teams" to fly to the UK on a hired DC-10 from Atlanta International Airport with suitcases of money for a campaign. Their intent was to make deals with retailers that sold Coke and Virgin Cola to get Virgin Cola removed from the shelves and to threaten them with the removal of Coca-Cola fridges if they refused. Branson admitted Virgin did not know this was going on and it eventually led to a drop in sales and Virgin Cola ceasing to be sold outside of Virgin companies. Later the Coke executive behind the campaign worked for Lloyds TSB and became the manager of Virgin Group's bank accounts. When Branson found out about this from her at a dinner, he later reported: "I wasn't sure whether to strangle her or not" but forgave her for it.
