= Industrial Reorganisation Corporation =

Entity of the British government

The Industrial Reorganisation Corporation (IRC) was an entity established by the Government of the United Kingdom to reorganise British industry that operated between 1966 and 1971.

== History ==
By the mid 1960s, there was a growing recognition that Britain's industrial sector had generally been in a sustained decline since the Second World War; this was partially attributable to its organisation and management, UK industries being were typically more localised, fragmented, diverse, and lower capitalised than key overseas competitors in Germany, the United States, and Italy. Figures within the First Wilson government sought a means to actively and selectively intervene to bring about a series of reorganisations with the goal of bolstering competitiveness and improving the position of such reorganised companies. To this end, in 1966, the Department of Economic Affairs sponsored the establishment of the Industrial Reorganisation Corporation (IRC). This new corporation was assigned the objective of encouraging mergers that would make British industries more competitive internationally.

The IRC had roughly 30 staff, most of which undertook the reviewing of, and meeting with, various companies; the chairman throughout most of its existence was Sir Frank Kearton. Its activities have been compared to those of a merchant bank, brokering deals and occasionally investing with its own resources. The IRC also discussed these prospective deals with officials within the Board of Trade, encouraging it not to refer such matters to the Monopolies Commission. Furthermore, Wilson's government was acutely aware of, and actively dissuaded, the notion that interventions by the IRC were a form of stealth-nationalisation.

IRC interventions included facilitating the merger of GEC and AEI in 1966 and of the merger of that enlarged entity with English Electric in 1968. It also facilitated the merger of British Motor Corporation with Leyland Motors in 1968, and the merger of ball bearing manufacturer RHP with Ransome & Marles in 1969. Also in 1969, the IRC provided financial assistance for the marine engineering firm Clarke Chapman acquisition of the bridge-building specialist Sir William Arrol & Co., as well as engineering specialist Weir Group's takeover of Osborn-Hadfields Steel Founders.

While the IRC did bring about numerous amalgamations, the outcomes of these reorganisations was not always what had intended, as these new companies often lacked integration, remained unspecialised, or did not necessarily take actions that had been anticipated. In practice, enlarged commercial entities did not automatically improve competitiveness. In the case of the General Electric Company, which acquired both Associated Electrical Industries and English Electric during the IRC's existence, its management showed little interest in the export market, integrating its various acquisitions, or in refining a clear strategic focus for its products.

Furthermore, the IRC was only involved in a small minority of the transactions that reshaped UK industry at this time. In 1968 alone, 598 acquisitions were completed, but only between 20 and 25 mergers had been influenced by the IRC each year. Its use of public funds to bring about mergers became a point of political controversy over the potential value and return on such expenditure.

By late 1970, the future of the IRC being hotly debated by the Heath ministry. Between 1971 and 1973, the organisation was dissolved.
