= Jessop Saville & Company =

Jessop Saville and Company, the Sheffield-based special steel makers, was founded in 1929 following a merger of J.J.Saville and Co., Limited and William Jessop and Company, both of these being long established in the trade and in the city.

== History ==
=== William Jessop and Company ===
Thomas Jessop was born on 30 January 1804 at the family home in Blast Lane, Sheffield. The house was situated next to William Jessop’s works, the company, taking the name of the partners, being known as Mitchell, Raikes and Jessop. With expanding markets in the United States, Thomas and his brothers joined the business in 1830 and just two years later the small crucible steelmakers became William Jessop & Sons.

The business moved to a site in the Brightside area of Sheffield and later a works at Kilnhurst was added. The Brightside works eventually covered 30 acres (120,000 m^{2}) and included the site of the former water works. Following the deaths of his father and brothers, Thomas was in sole charge of the business by 1871. The company which was originally established in 1793 became a Limited Company in 1875. Thomas Jessop died on 30 November 1887 and is buried in Ecclesall Parish Churchyard.

Jessops in America. In 1901, with problems in Sheffield caused by the high price of fuel and an adverse American tariff the company was having difficulty offering competitive prices to its U.S. customers. Following an amalgamation of some U.S. crucible steel makers, which would make competition even harder, it was considered that a successful melting facility could be set up in the U.S.A. Many British steel-makers considered that the "Made in England" or "Made in Sheffield" marks were a big selling point for their materials, however Jessop's did not hold the view and considered that they could use their Sheffield name on steel which was made in America.

=== J.J. Saville & Company ===
J.J.Saville were Sheffield crucible steel and file makers based at Libau Works in the city.

== Rationalisation ==
It was seen in the mid-1960s that some rationalisation was needed within the Sheffield steel industry, particularly steel founding. With respect to this Jessop Saville separated its interests. Similar moves were taking place at Samuel Osborn & Company, Edgar Allen and Company and Hadfields Limited.

The intention was to merge the foundry interests of the four companies to form one large steel foundry with the capability of making castings from a few ounces to 40 tons, with only English Steel Corporation's Grimesthorpe foundry in the city able to make larger. As negotiations were taking place the deal fell through leaving Osbourne's and Hadfield's to merge, with the foundry being located on Hadfield's East Hecla (Vulcan Road) site, and Edgar Allen's to purchase Jessop's, relocating Jessop's special alloy (medium frequency) melting on Edgar's Sheffield Road site and the 3-ton electric furnace at their Imperial Steel Works site.

== Whiston Grange Research Centre ==
Following the end of World War II, Service Camps were set up to house returning troops, Polish soldiers, prisoners of war, teachers and building craftsmen in training. From 1946 Whiston Grange, near Rotherham, was used for this purpose, however, by 1950, it had become a research centre for the company.

Special Steels, Titanium and its alloys. Research work on Jessop's alloys and special materials for the aerospace industry was carried out in the laboratories, and it was also here that the initial work on the casting of Titanium and its alloys took place. The tie-up with Edgar Allen released foundry space at Brightside Lane and in early 1967 it was decided to convert the research carried out at Whiston Grange into the installation of the world's first commercial casting plant for titanium and titanium alloys on the Brightside Lane site. In the late 1960s, BSA, the owners of Jessop Saville, sold their titanium interests to IMI who absorbed Jessop's alloys into their range.

== Closure ==
The Brightside Lane site was closed in the late 1980s and cleared. It lay dormant for several years before being sold and laid out as an office park, being known as "Jessop's Riverside".

== Up to date ==
In February 1998, Special Melted Products Limited, a Sheffield-based melting and remelting specialists, and Jessop Saville Limited were acquired by Allegheny Teledyne. Of particular interest to the buyers were Jessops specialist products, particularly their non-magnetic drill collars and downhole components for the oil and gas industry.

== Philanthropy ==
Situated in Figtree Lane, in Sheffield city centre, a hospital for sick women was founded by three local doctors. Having only six beds, later extended to nine, it soon outgrew the building (which still stands and in use as solicitors offices) and a search was made for land on which to build a new hospital. A site was found in Levygreave, then on the edge of the city centre, and in 1875, Thomas Jessop provided the funds to buy the site and build the Jessop Hospital for Sick Women. The hospital, which was opened in 1878, and named after its benefactor, closed in 2000. The site is now being used by the University of Sheffield Biosciences Department and a new women's wing, known as The Jessop Wing, was added to the city's Royal Hallamshire Hospital.

Thomas Jessop, along with others within the city's steel industry, supported the setting up of Sheffield Technical School in 1884. This, in 1905, became the embryo of the University of Sheffield.
