= Lincoln Christmas Market =

Annual Christmas market in Lincoln, England

Coordinates: 53.2343°N 0.5389°W

Lincoln Christmas Market, held in Lincoln, England, was one of the largest Christmas markets in Europe, attracting over 250,000 people over the four-day event. It was held from 1982 until 2022. This has been replaced by city wide festive events.

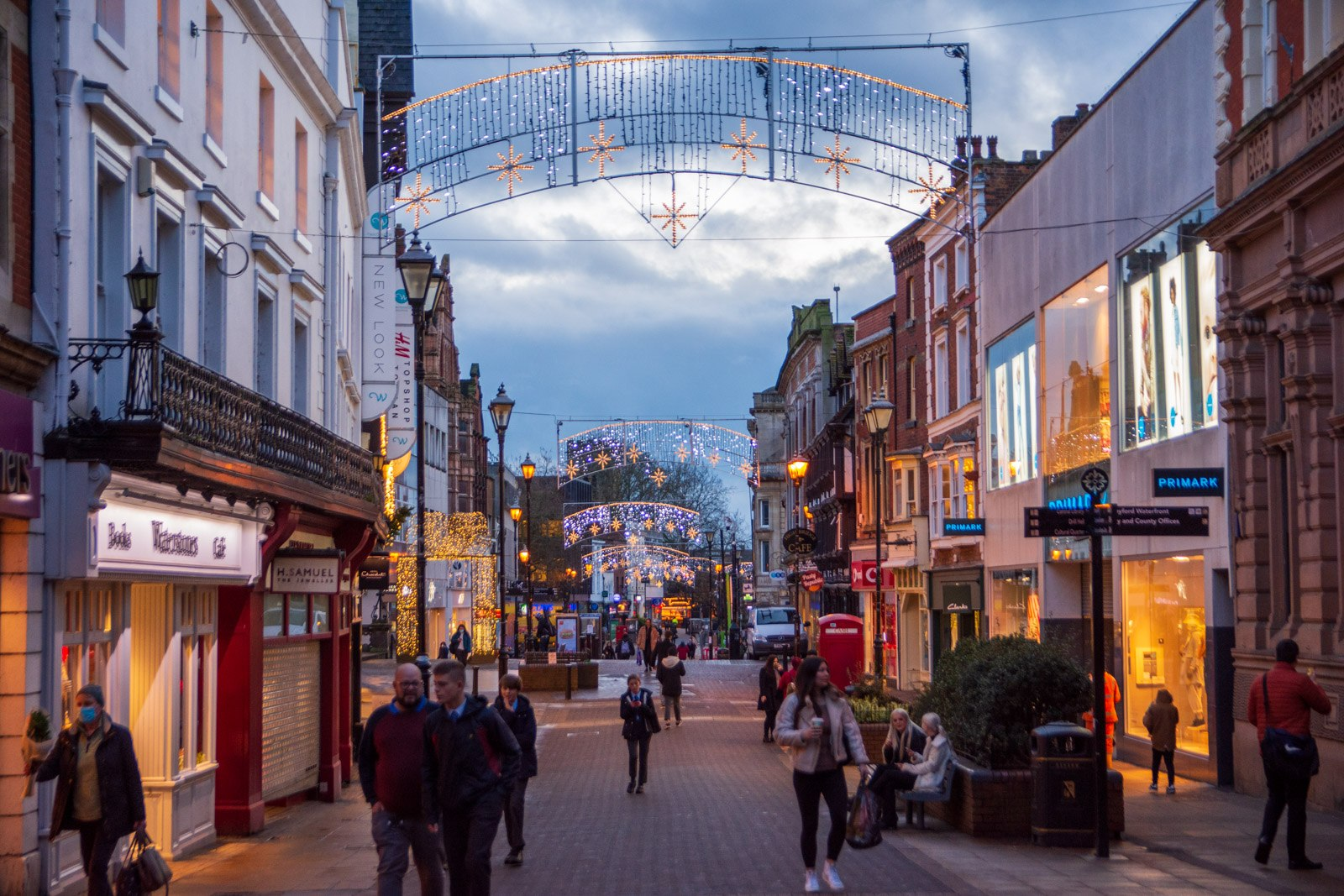
The High Street at Christmas

The market was held around three weeks before Christmas - from the first Thursday in December to the following Sunday, the market spread around the historic centre of Lincoln including the castle and cathedral. As well as stalls selling goods there was a funfair with Ferris wheel, open air classical music and rock concerts and traditional events such as beer barrel rolling.

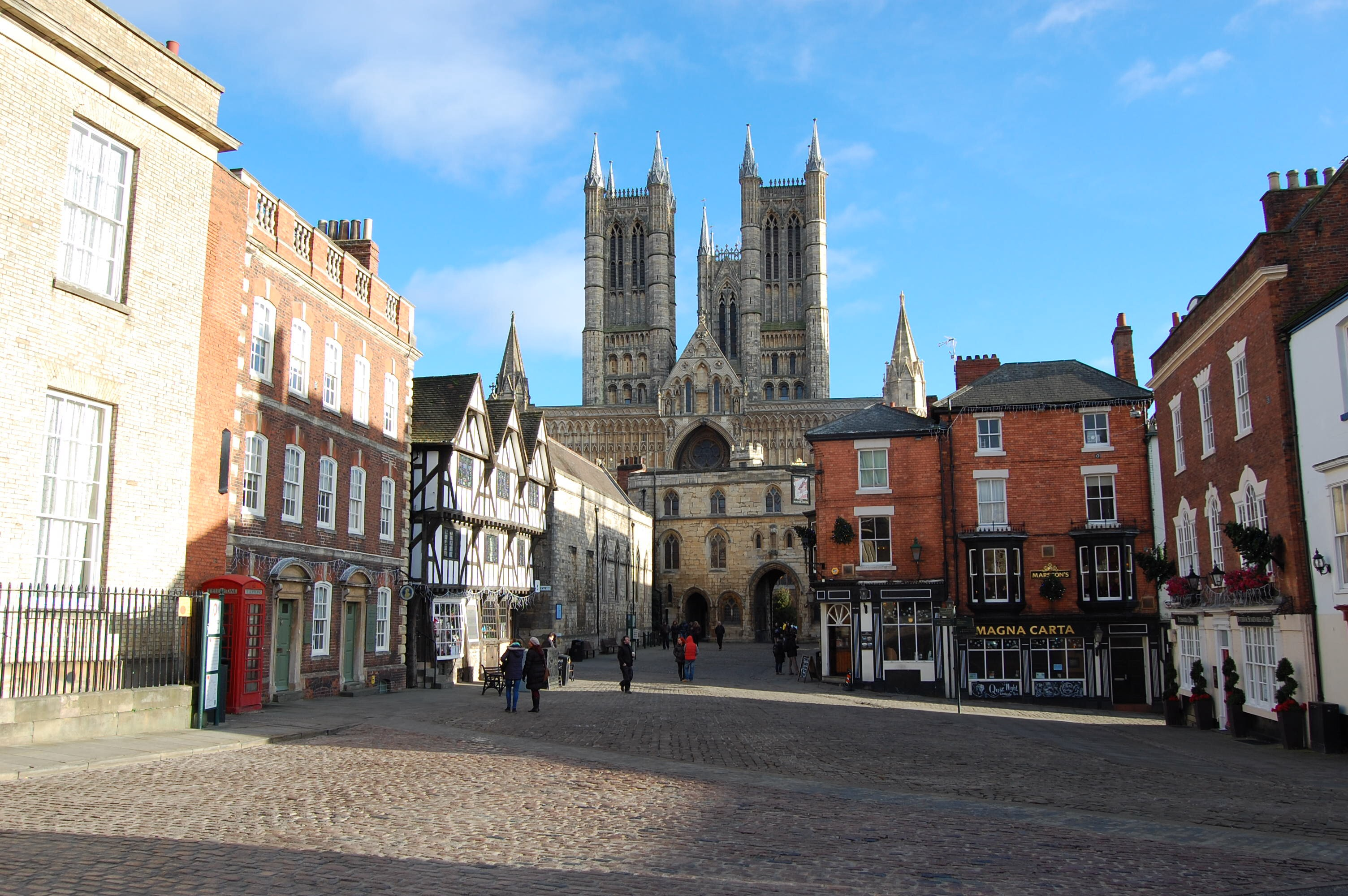
Lincoln on Christmas Day

The number of visitors was so great that a circular one-way system for pedestrians around the streets of Lincoln is put into place. The route includes travelling through the grounds of Lincoln Castle.

== History ==
Lincoln Christmas Market was the first Christmas market in the United Kingdom. It was first held in 1982, after Council Leader, Jim Sullivan, Bob Hodson and Charles Ireland visited Neustadt an der Weinstrasse (Lincoln's twin town) and were impressed by the Neustadt Christmas Market. When they came back to Lincoln, they set up their own Christmas market consisting of just eleven stalls. The market was cancelled in 2010 due to severe weather conditions both in the city of Lincoln and the surrounding region. This was the first time the market had been cancelled in over 28 years.

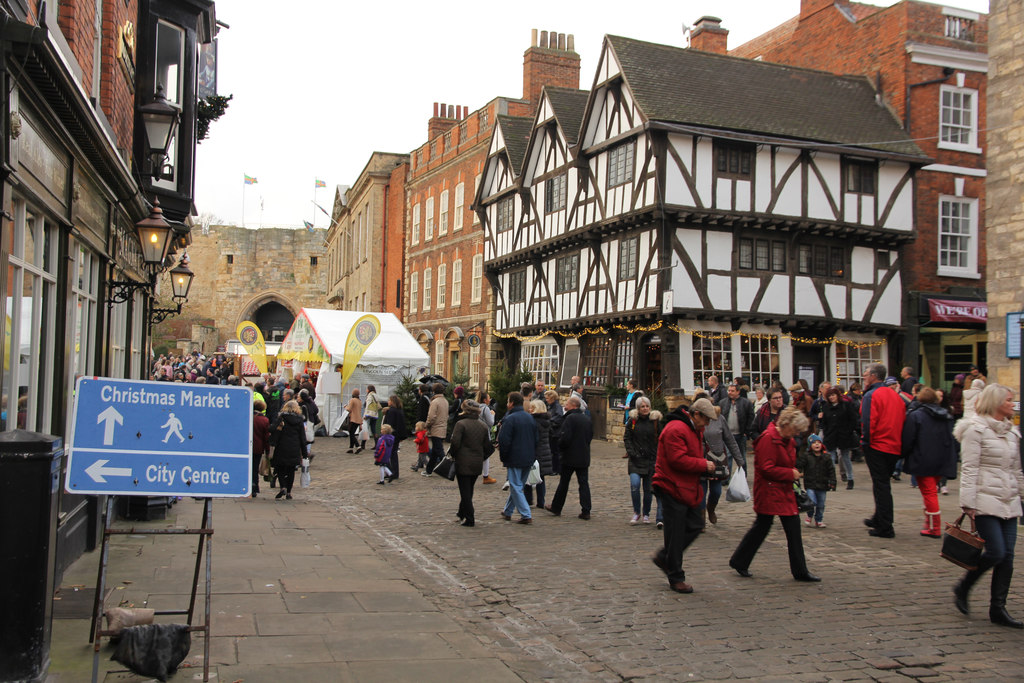
Lincoln Christmas Market

In 2017, the last day of the market was cancelled due to the forecast of bad snow. It turned out that the snow never materialised and Lincoln City council were left embarrassed by the decision as they received much criticism from the public and press. The market was held for the last time in 2022, being officially cancelled by City of Lincoln Council's executive committee in February, 2023.

== Train transport ==
During the weekend of the market, charter trains are organised from around Britain. In 2006 this included Central Trains hiring a Class 47 hauled set from the West Coast Railways, to provide additional and increased capacity services between Leicester, Nottingham and Lincoln railway stations. Hertfordshire Rail Tours organised a charter train from London King's Cross. A train organised by the Scottish Railway Preservation Society travelled down starting from the Scottish town of Linlithgow, then proceeding via Edinburgh and the East Coast Main Line.

In previous years, Central Trains had hired an InterCity 125 set from Midland Mainline for the Nottingham to Lincoln shuttle. Other rail tours for the Christmas Market, including steam-hauled trains, have set out from Blackpool and the London stations of Finsbury Park and London Victoria. Carriages from the classic Venice-Simplon Orient Express train have been used on some of these services.
