= Ransome & Marles =

Ransome & Marles Bearing Company Limited
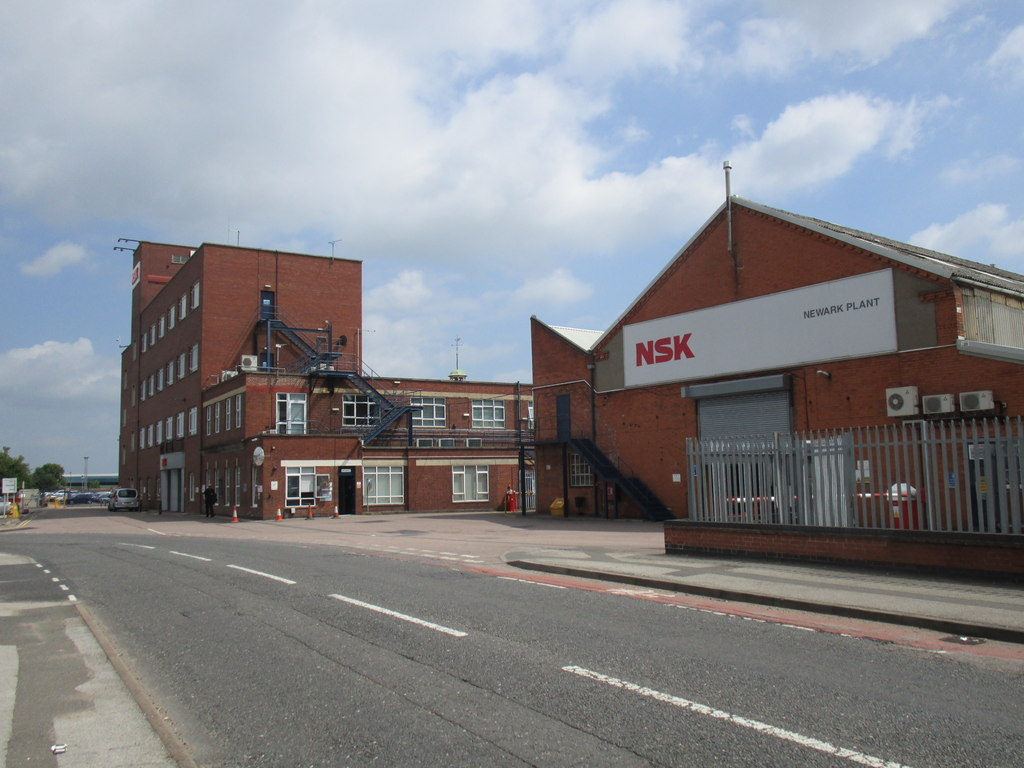
- Some of the remaining buildings Newark-on-Trent June 2014
- Company type: Public limited company
- Traded as: Ransome & Marles
- Industry: Automotive; Aerospace etcetera
- Founded: c.1916 (Newark-on-Trent)
- Fate: From 1990 part of NSK Ltd
- Headquarters: Newark-on-Trent, Nottinghamshire
- Key people: V S Woods (Chairman); Henry Marles (inventor & director); H J Higgs (managing director)
- Products: Rolling element bearings, linear motion products, seals, lubrication systems, maintenance products

Ransome & Marles Bearing Company Limited was a British company which made ball bearings and roller bearings. It was founded during the First World War to make bearings for aircraft and other engines. Before the war most bearings had been imported, chiefly from Germany.

The business is now part of NSK UK, but Ransome & Marles' former plant, Stanley Works, remains in operation on Northern Road, Newark in Nottinghamshire.

== Products ==
The ball-bearing industry provides an essential input to the motor, machine tool, engineering and aircraft industries.

== History ==
=== A Ransome & Co ===
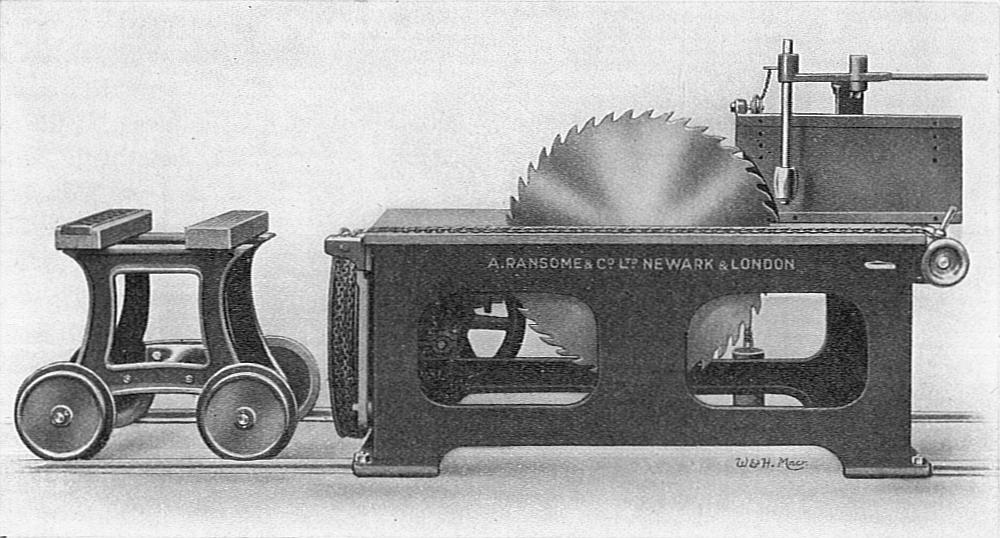
Self-acting sawbench

Ransome & Marles grew from another separate business needing bearings for its own products. In 1868 Allen Ransome (1833–1913) and Frederic Josselyn (1842–1900) set up A Ransome & Co in Chelsea, London.

A Ransome & Co designed and manufactured woodworking and timber-handling machinery.

Later they acquired a foundry in Battersea. Vincent Sydney Woods (1855–1939) joined them at the foundry and the foundry firm's name was Ransome, Josselyn and Woods. In 1893 the two businesses were amalgamated under the ownership of a new incorporated company, A Ransome and Co Limited.

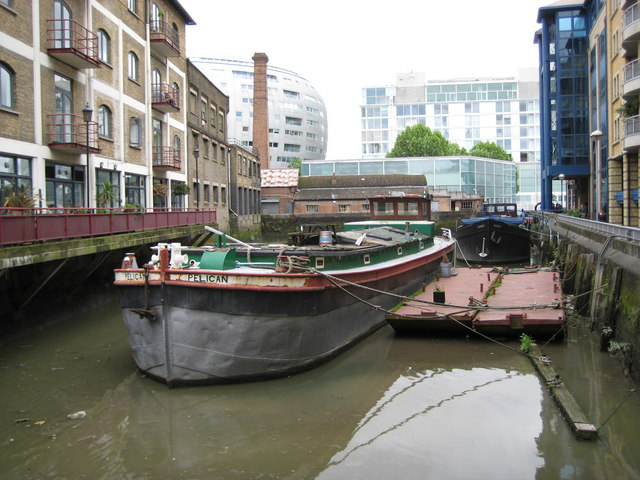
Part of Ransome's dock 2008, and possibly the foundry's chimney

In 1900 all A Ransome and Co activities were moved to Newark-on-Trent, Nottinghamshire under the management of V S Woods though a London office was retained in Chancery Lane. There was also a tie to Ransomes, engineers of Ipswich and manufacturer of aeroplanes during World War I. Allen Ransome was the younger son of their J A Ransome and retained an interest in that business. Woodworking machinery was needed during World War I, aeroplanes were made of wood and fabric.

Ransome's Dock. In the mid-1880s Allen Ransome improved the Battersea foundry's surrounds also turning the creek by the foundry into a dock. He was assisted by civil engineer Edward Woods (1814–1903), father of Ransome's partner V S Woods. It was made large enough to take coastal steamers and allow vessels to pass or turn.

At the turn of the century when Ransome's moved to Newark the foundry became Drew-Bear Perks & Co's Battersea Steelworks. In the 21st century it is a haven for houseboats.

=== Ransome & Marles ===
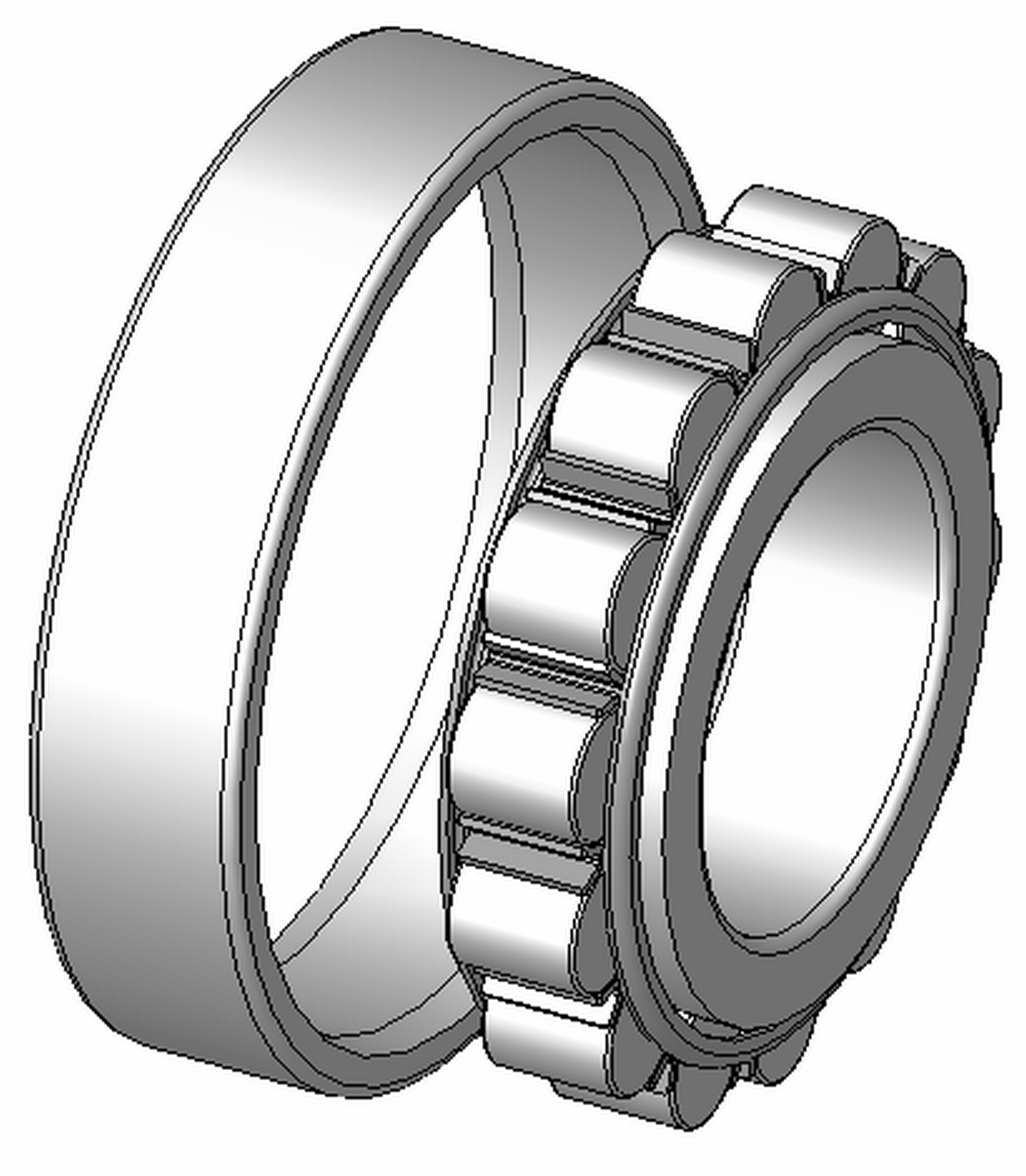
Cylindrical roller bearing outer race off to show its rollers

Animation of ball bearing (An ideal picture without cage) Note that the red dots meet every 1.5 revolutions

Ransomes had an association with inventor Henry Marles who held patents for wood carving machinery which he had taken out in 1899. Towards the end of 1917 journalists were shown through a new ball bearing plant in Newark under conditions of strict secrecy though they were allowed to publish the name of the owners, Ransome & Marles. Henry Marles held some patents for the design and manufacture of ball bearings, A. Ransome & Co had some experience in their manufacture. Aside from their own requirement A. Ransome & Co were already supplying "famous English motor manufacturers". They had begun by assembling bought-in balls with their own components then moved on to manufacturing their own balls. A new ball-making plant, which the journalists were visiting, had now been installed in new premises alongside A. Ransome & Co's own though the new plant was not in production at the end of 1917.

The first chairman of Ransome & Marles was Victor Sydney Woods, the youngest partner in A. Ransome & Co. The first managing director was Henry Marles (1871- 1955 ) until just after the end of the war and the appointment of American-born Lt. Col. Henry Joseph Higgs (1892-1934) when Marles with his technical knowledge took up the position of sales director. Allen Ransome's son, Geoffrey Ransome (1867-1928), was a director of both companies.

By October 1918, shortly before the Armistice, Woods told Ransome & Marles shareholders at their 2nd Annual General Meeting there had again been a large increase in premises and plant during the year. The three-story building accommodating 500 people had not been completed until May 1918 but full output should be reached by the end of 1918.

The adjoining engineering works of A Ransome & Co, the original Stanley Works, were bought by Ransome & Marles when they were put up for sale in 1932. The premises were described as a freehold site of 9 acres (3.6 ha) with sidings to the L & NE railway and factory buildings covering 130,000 square feet (1.2 ha). A. Ransome & Co's woodworking machinery business itself was taken over by the woodworking firm of John Pickles and Son of Hebden Bridge, Yorkshire.

The three year factory and plant extensions programme finished in 1938 was in response to a new demand for new motor vehicles as well as rearmament. Within a short time it was followed by the addition of another new workshop completed in early 1940.

After the war, in 1954, a new factory was opened in County Durham at Greencroft near Annfield Plain. The decision to make that investment had been made in 1950.

=== Export markets ===
South African agent, D Drury & Co, was purchased and made a subsidiary in 1952. Next the Australian agent, Gardner Waern & Co, was purchased and became a wholly owned subsidiary. The opportunity arose later to purchase the Australian government's ball-bearing factory at Echuca. After negotiations Echuca was purchased not outright but as a joint venture with Skefko and Skefko's parent, SKF.

=== Aggregation ===
In 1969 Ransome's joined with Hoffman's and Pollard's as subsidiaries of RHP Limited. This was at the direction of the Wilson (Labour) government's Industrial Reorganisation Corporation in the face of attempts by Swedish-controlled manufacturer, Skefko, to gain control of the British industry. The new RHP group commanded about 40 percent of the total British market.

Immediately prior to the aggregation in RHP limited Ransome & Marles produced 16 to 17 percent of the British output of taper bearings.

RHP along with Neuweg (Germany) became subsidiaries of Nippon Seiko KK or NSK Ltd of Japan in 1990
