= NSK Ltd. =

Japanese manufacturer of bearings

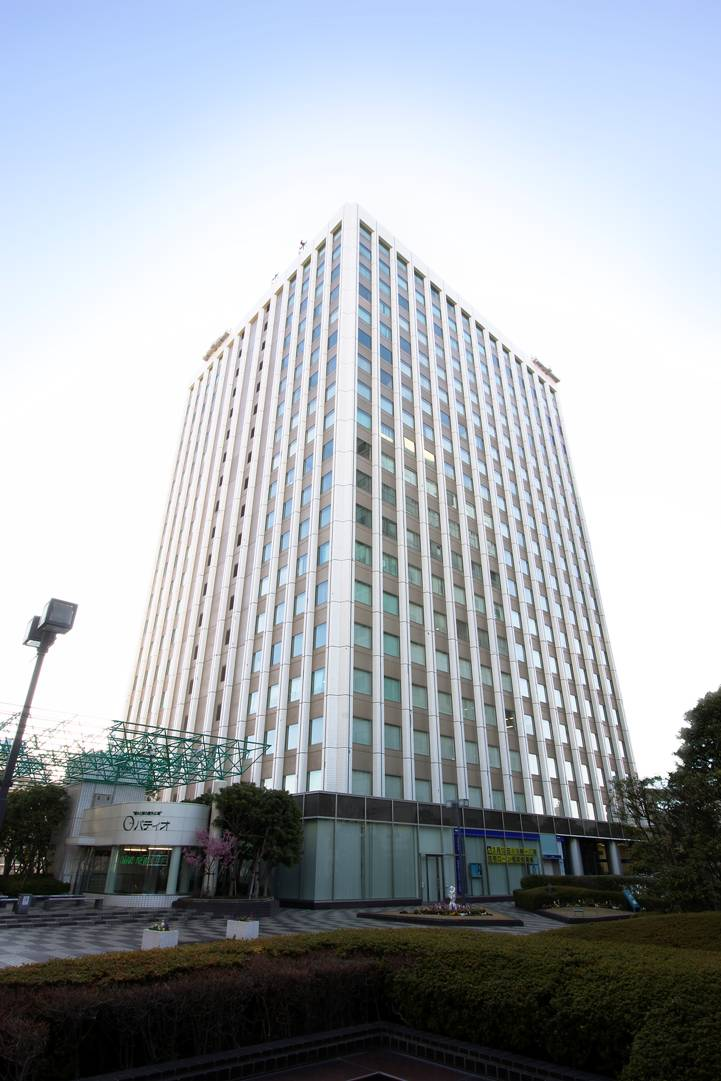
- NSK headquarters in the Nissei Building in Tokyo
- Native name: 日本精工株式会社
- Romanized name: Nippon Seikō Kabushiki-gaisha
- Company type: Public (K.K)
- Traded as: TYO: 6471
- ISIN: JP3720800006
- Industry: Machinery
- Founded: Tokyo (November 8, 1916; 109 years ago)
- Founder: Takehiko Yamaguchi; Takahashi Korekiyo
- Headquarters: 1-6-3 Ōsaki, Shinagawa-ku, Tokyo, 141-8560, Japan
- Key people: Akitoshi Ichii (President/CEO)
- Products: Industrial Machinery Bearings; Precision Machinery & Parts; Automotive Bearings; Automotive Components
- Website: www.nsk.com

NSK Ltd. (日本精工株式会社, Nippon Seikō Kabushiki-gaisha; Japan Precision Company), also known in some markets as NSK Automation, is a large manufacturer of bearings globally and the largest in Japan. The company produces industrial machinery bearings, precision machinery and parts, and automotive bearings and components.

The company is listed on the Tokyo Stock Exchange, is a component of the Nikkei 225 stock index, and has over 144 overseas operations in 29 countries. | Capital = ▲67.2 billion Japanese Yen (as of March 31, 2021) | Annual Net Sales = ▲747.6 billion Japanese Yen (Year ended March 31, 2021)

== History ==
Nippon Seiko Limited partnership company was established in Tokyo in 1914 with a team of six employees under president Takehiko Yamaguchi. This partnership company successfully developed Japan's first ball bearings. The company's first inaugural general meeting of shareholders was held on 8th of November 1916. This day is considered as the founding date of NSK Ltd. In 1926 company started mass production of steel balls in Osaki plant & in 1934 another new plant in Tokyo (Tamagawa Plant).

== Present day business ==
30,577 employees form a worldwide technology network consisting of over 65 production plants in 14 countries. Approximately three million new bearings are manufactured per day (from miniature bearings with a one-millimetre bore to bearings with a diameter of five meters).

== Gallery ==
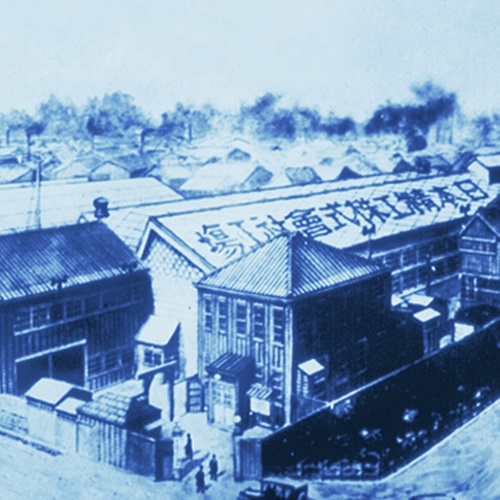
The first NSK plant
in Japan in 1916

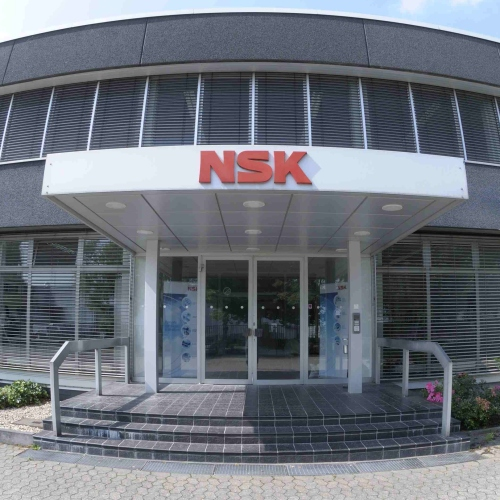
NSK offices in Ratingen, Germany

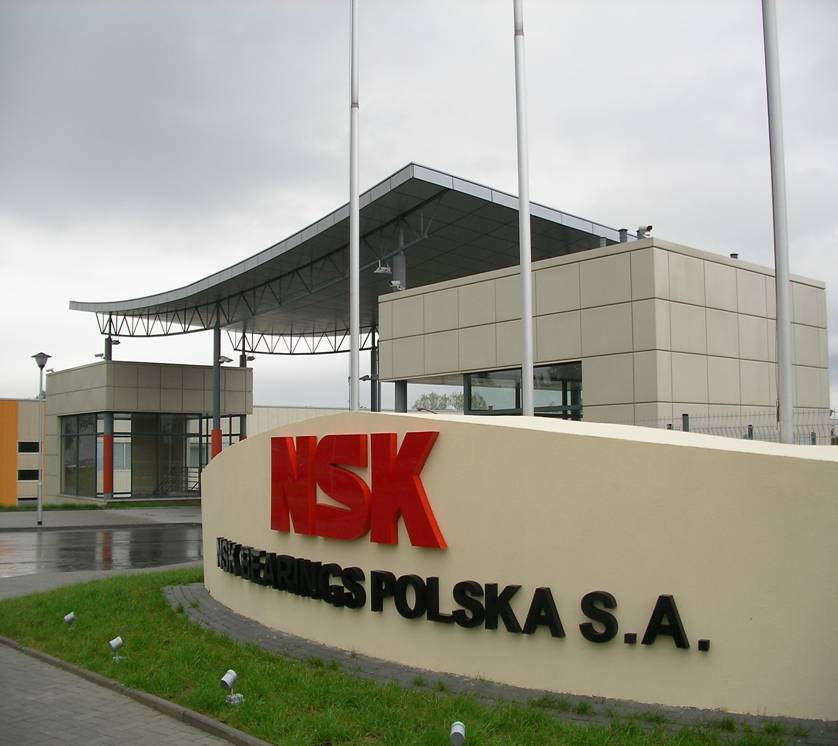
NSK plant in Poland

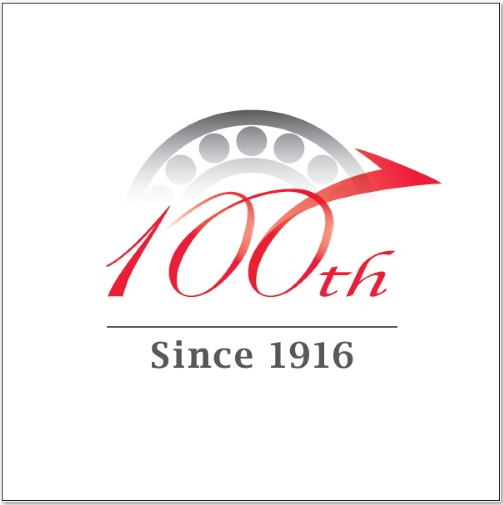
NSK 100 Years logo

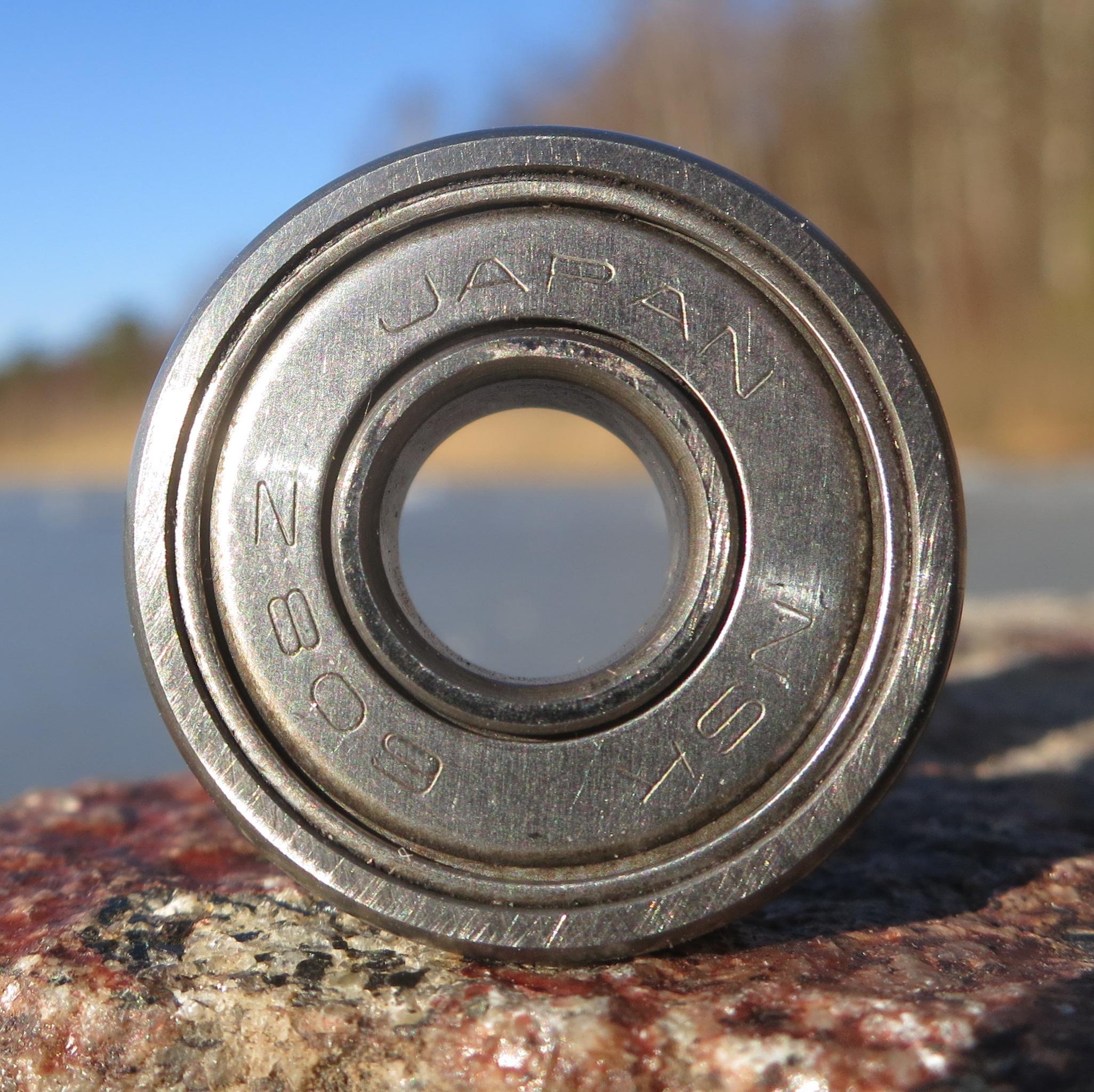
NSK ball bearing from the 1990s
