= English Steel Corporation =

Steel producer

The English Steel Corporation Ltd was a United Kingdom steel producer. The company was jointly owned by Cammell Laird and Vickers and was formed to bring together their basic steel making interests, principally in the Sheffield area but also including a plant in Openshaw, Manchester.

The company was nationalised in 1951, becoming part of the Iron and Steel Corporation of Great Britain, was denationalised shortly afterwards, and renationalised and absorbed into British Steel Corporation in 1967. It was then subsequently privatised. Eventually the present business was acquired in a management buyout in 2005 and is now called Sheffield Forgemasters.

For more information see the constituent companies' articles.

== Sources ==
- Whitaker's Almanack (various dates)
