= List of People's Century interviewees =

The 1995 BBC/PBS documentary People's Century interviewed over one hundred persons who witnessed key events during the 20th century, including several centenarians who could recall the First World War and even earlier. Most interviewees were not well known, but may be physically recognisable from a famous photograph or image. Below are listed by nationality those persons who were interviewed, along with the occupations they were noted for, and the episodes in which they were featured.

== Afghans ==
- Gul Haydar: guerrilla (1984) (War of the Flea)
- Ahmed Shah Masoud: guerrilla leader (1980) (War of the Flea)
- Madar Shawal: guerrilla courier (1982) (War of the Flea)

== Americans ==
- Arthur Abeles: film distributor (1948) (Great Escape)
- Harold Agnew: Los Alamos scientist (1945, 1962) (Fallout)
- Martine Algier: Michigan teenager (New Release)
- John Anderson: cinema usher (1927) (Great Escape)
- Richard Ayers: law student (1969), then environmental lawyer (Endangered Planet)
- Alexander Azar: Fort Wayne hamburger advertiser (Picture Power)
- Bill Bailey: Telegraph boy, later unemployed, later US Navy worker (Breadline)
- Carl Bagge: railway company lawyer (1963), later coal company lobbyist (1977) (Endangered Planet)
- Kathy Bergstrom: Los Angeles teacher (1970s) (Fast Forward)
- Benjamin Berger: father of murdered Israeli weightlifter, David Mark Berger (Picture Power)
- Dorothy Berger: mother of murdered Israeli weightlifter, David Mark Berger (Picture Power)
- Paul Boatin: Ford production worker (1932) (On the Line)
- Bill Braga: New Jersey resident (1956) (Boomtime)
- Georgette Braga: New Jersey resident (1956) (Boomtime)
- Evelyn Brauckmiller: shipyard worker (1943) (Total War)
- Shorty Brauckmiller: shipyard worker (1943) (Total War)
- Beryl Bristow: (born 1896) (Age of Hope)
- Berlyn Brixner: US Army cameraman (1945) (Fallout)
- Art Buckner: Kaiser Steel steelworker, later unemployed (Fast Forward)
- Marjorie Brandt: Fort Wayne television viewer (Picture Power)
- Tela Burt: World War I African-American soldier (Killing Fields)
- Dennis Byas: Kaiser Steel steelworker, later financial controller (Fast Forward)
- Jacqui Ceballos: National Organization for Women organiser (1970) (Half the People)
- Amy Coen: University of Michigan student (1969), later family planning adviser (Half the People)
- Red Cole: Ford production worker (On the Line)
- Margaret Colombo: Philco production worker (1930) (On the Line)
- Erv Dasher: Ford production worker (1922) (On the Line)
- John Deangelo: Ford production worker (On the Line)
- Elizabeth Dobynes: Fort Wayne television viewer (Picture Power)
- Betty DuBrul: Levittown resident (1953) (Boomtime)
- Anilu Elias: mother (Half the People)
- Mike Eruzione: Captain, United States ice hockey team at the 1980 Winter Olympics (Fast Forward)
- Anna Freund: New York Yankees supporter (1930) (Sporting Fever)
- Manny Fried: trade union organiser (Brave New World)
- Eddie Futch: boxing coach (Sporting Fever)
- Lois Gibbs: Love Canal activist (1977) (Endangered Planet)
- Nellie Gillenson: emigrant (Age of Hope)
- Tina Grate: Los Angeles mother (Fast Forward)
- Ernest Green: Little Rock schoolboy (1950s) (Skin Deep)
- David Hackworth: US army colonel (1966) (War of the Flea)
- Gail Halverson: US Air Force lieutenant and "Candy Bomber" (Brave New World)
- Lement Harris: journalist (1932) (Breadline)
- Denis Hayes: Earth Day organiser (1970) (Endangered Planet)
- Frankie Henry: Tennessee State University student (1960) (Skin Deep)
- Don Hewitt: CBS director (Picture Power)
- James Hill: Oak Ridge scientist (1945) (Fallout)
- Tom Jelley: Ford production worker (On the Line)
- Jeff Jones: Weatherman activist (1970) (New Release)
- Sheldon Johnson: US Army soldier (1945) and Saint George, Utah resident (Fallout)
- Lloyd Kiff: ornithologist (Endangered Planet)
- Bernadette Lafayette: civil rights activist (1960) (Skin Deep)
- Thomas Larkin: Stockbroker (Breadline)
- Abe Lass: Nickelodeon attendee (1911) (Great Escape)
- James Lewis: army doctor (1944) (Living Longer)
- Joe Liguori: spectator of Dempsey match (Sporting Fever)
- Cy Locke: US armed forces projectionist (1945) (Great Escape)
- James Lovell: Apollo 8 astronaut (Endangered Planet)
- Floyd Mann: Alabama policeman (1961) (Skin Deep)
- David Moore: Ford foundery worker (1932) and trade unionist (On the Line)
- Mancel Milligan: forester, later Tennessee Valley Authority worker (Breadline)
- John Morton-Finney: (born 1889) civil rights activist (Age of Hope)
- Robert Nathan: economics student (Breadline)
- Edwin Nerger: Fort Wayne priest (Picture Power)
- Wally Neilsen: Marshall Aid organiser (1948) (Boomtime)
- Charlie Nusser: Communist supporter (1934) (Red Flag)
- Chuck O'Donahue: smelter worker (Endangered Planet)
- Caryn Pace: Long Island resident (1956) (Boomtime)
- Colleen Parro: Texas housewife (1947) (Half the People)
- Albert Powis: World War I marine (Killing Fields)
- Barbara "Dusty" Roads: flight attendant (Half the People)
- William Robertson: US Army lieutenant (1945) (Brave New World)
- Terry Ross: Coto de Caza resident (1990s) (Fast Forward)
- Vivian Rothstein: University of California student (1965), later civil rights campaigner (New Release)
- F. Sherwood Rowland: Stanford University academic (Endangered Planet)
- Deborah Runkle: polio sufferer (Living Longer)
- Rusty Sachs: US Marine pilot (1966) (New Release)
- Tom Saffer: US marine (Fallout)
- Yetta Sperling: emigrant (Age of Hope)
- Peter Staley: AIDS activist (1989) (Living Longer)
- Helen Stephens: sprinter at Olympics (Sporting Fever)
- Sharon Stern: polio sufferer (Living Longer)
- George Stith: cotton sharecropper (1935) (Breadline)
- Loye Stoops: farmer, Dustbowl evacuee (Breadline)
- Jim Sullivan: Ford production worker (1938) and trade unionist (On the Line)
- Bill Sweinler: Mosinee schoolboy (1950) (Brave New World)
- John Tekkaman: Swedish immigrant (Breadline)
- Ron Thelin: Californian boy scout, later hippy (New Release)
- C T Vivien: Baptist minister (1965) (Skin Deep)
- Lorena Weeks: Atlanta telephone operator (1949) (Half the People)
- Bill Werber: New York Yankees player (1929) (Sporting Fever)
- Zekozy Williams: Montgomery housemaid (1965) (Skin Deep)
- Earl Young: diplomat (1968) (War of the Flea)
- Jim Zwerg: Fisk University student and freedom rider (1961) (Skin Deep)

== Australians ==
- Edward Smout: World War I medic (Killing Fields)
- Cec Starr: cricket supporter (Sporting Fever)

== Austrians ==
- Norbert Lopper: Viennese Jew, later worker at Auschwitz (Master Race)

== Belgians ==
- Yvonne Mouffe: child during Great Depression (Breadline)
- Pierre Rondas: Louvain refugee (1940) (Total War)

== Belarusians ==
- Sergei Butsko: (born 1896) villager (Age of Hope)
- Serafima Schibko: villager (Total War)

== Bosnians ==
- Fikret Alic: Bosnian Muslim detained at Trnopolje camp (Fast Forward)
- Tomka Miric: Bosnian Serb (Fast Forward)

== British ==
- Sid Bailey: British Union of Fascists member (Breadline)
- Majorie Cave: TB sufferer (Living Longer)
- John Cracknell: Surrey County Cricket Club supporter (1922) (Sporting Fever)
- Burt Calver: Surrey County Cricket Club supporter (1922) (Sporting Fever)
- Jenny Cole: London teenager (New Release)
- Iris Davis: biscuit maker (1932) (On the Line)
- Les Ellis: TB sufferer (Living Longer)
- Sally Doganis:Aldermaston Marches participant (1958) (Fallout)
- Hayden Evans: pressed steel worker, trip hammer operator (1934) (On the Line)
- Elizabeth Finn: film viewer (1912) (Great Escape)
- Conrad Frost: television viewer (1930s) (Picture Power)
- Sidney Garner: West Ham United Football Club football supporter (1923) (Sporting Fever)
- Lillian Gillen: crane driver (1942) (Half the People)
- Kathleen Green: Welsh film viewer (1925) (Great Escape)
- Edmund Frow: Ford UK production worker (On the Line)
- Elizabeth Finn: mother (1939) (Total War)
- Walter Hare: soldier (Killing Fields, Lost Peace)
- Karen Harrison: first female British Rail train driver (1979) (Half the People)
- Eva Hart: Titanic survivor (Age of Hope)
- Jennifer Hart: League of Nations Union member (Lost Peace)
- Charles Hill: Vulcan engineering apprentice (On the Line)
- Donald Hodge: child who witnessed 1899 (Age of Hope, Fast Forward)
- Reg Howard: Salford apprentice mechanic (1960) (New Release)
- John Hunter:civil defence volunteer (1960) (Fallout)
- Gertrude Jarrett: (born 1890) suffragette (Age of Hope)
- Ray Jordan: Coventry resident (1965) (Boomtime)
- Rita Kaye: cinema pianist (Great Escape)
- Carol Kemp: London teenager (New Release)
- Betty Lawrence: Plymouth midwifery student (1941) (Total War)
- Ernie Lambert: Sutherland Football Club supporter (Sporting Fever)
- Cecil Lewis: World War I pilot (Killing Fields)
- Mike Losban: Manchester teenager (New Release)
- Billy McShane: Jarrow shipbuilder, later Jarrow Crusade marcher (Breadline)
- Robert Mitchell: member of British Olympic water polo (1936) (Sporting Fever)
- Walter Moran: Decca factory worker (1936) (On the Line)
- Sid Newman: Plymouth resident (Total War)
- Donald Newton: music shop manager (1963) (New Release)
- Geoff Nugent: member of The Undertakers (New Release)
- Billy O'Donnell: Liverpool Football Club supporter (1922) (Sporting Fever)
- Olga Penrose: RSPCA volunteer (1967) (Endangered Planet)
- Daphne Richards: bus driver (1970) (Half the People)
- Amy Sears: (born 1892) witnessed Queen Victoria (Age of Hope)
- Con Shiels: Jarrow shipbuilder, later Jarrow Crusade marcher (Breadline)
- Lord Soper: pacifist campaigner (Lost Peace)
- Mary Stott: Leicester voter (1929), then journalist (1950) (Half the People)
- Norman Tennant: World War I artillerist (Killing Fields)
- Jonathan Tod: Royal Navy pilot (1967) (Endangered Planet)
- David Triesman: Essex University student protest leader (New Release)
- Ena Turnbull: London cinema pianist (Great Escape)
- Wendy Vause: television viewer (1950s) (Picture Power)
- Minnie Way: Glasgow striker b1895 (Age of Hope)
- Joyce Wheedon: Ford machinist (1968) (Half the People)
- George Williams: London film viewer (Great Escape)
- Macinlay Wooden: soldier (1918), then Kansas farmer (Lost Peace)
- Harry Young: Communist supporter (1917) (Red Flag)

== Canadians ==
- Robert Hunter: Greenpeace President (1975) (Endangered Planet)
- Maurice Strong: Stockholm Conference chairman (1972) (Endangered Planet)

== Chileans ==
- Justo Ballesteros: copper miner (Breadline)
- Claudina Montano Diaz: nitrates worker (Breadline)

== Chinese ==
- Shao Ailing: Shanghai school head (1966) (Great Leap)
- Hu Benxu: Sichuan peasant farmer (1930, 1958) (Great Leap)
- Zhang Baoqing: Beijing Red Guard (1966) (Great Leap)
- Ho Bo: photographer (1949) (Great Leap)
- Ren Fugin: Beijing street committee official (1954) (Great Leap)
- Zeng Guodong: Tinjin district party secretary (1954, 1967) (Great Leap)
- Jin Jingzhi: Shanghai resident (1935) (Great Leap)
- He Jinhua: Henan steelworker (1958) (Great Leap)
- Zhu Meichu: street singer (1980s) (Fast Forward)
- Luo Shifa: Sichuan party official (1950, 1960) (Great Leap)
- Jiao Shouyun: Beijing Red Guard (1966) (Great Leap)
- Lian Tianyun: Henan steelworker (1958) (Great Leap)
- Guo Jing Tong: (born 1890) witnessed Chinese revolution in 1911 (Age of Hope)
- Tong Xiangling: Shanghai opera singer (1966) (Great Leap)
- Tan Xianyao: Shanghai factory worker (Fast Forward)
- Guao Xiuying: Beijing literacy teacher (1955) (Great Leap)
- Quian Xuhui: Yunan migrant factory worker (Fast Forward)
- Ren Yangcheng: Henan canal worker (1960) (Great Leap)
- Wang Yong: Shanghai stockbroker (Fast Forward)
- Qi Youyi: Beijing factory worker (1954, 1970) (Great Leap)

== Cubans ==
- Arsenio Garcia: guerrilla (1956) (War of the Flea)
- Alberto Leon: guerrilla (1959) (War of the Flea)

== Czechs ==
- Josef Beldar: Czech civil defence (1938) (Lost Peace)
- Bohumir Kriz: WHO smallpox team member (Living Longer)
- Anna Masaryka: granddaughter of Tomáš Garrigue Masaryk (1918) (Lost Peace)
- Petr Miller: metal worker (People Power)
- Gertrud Peitsch: Sudeten German resident (1938) (Lost Peace)
- Jiri Stursa: schoolboy (1918) (Lost Peace)

== Dutch ==
- Rita Hendriks: Dolle Mina activist (1970) (Half the People)

== Egyptians ==
- Fathia El Assal: Cairo writer (1969) (God Fights Back)
- Ali Abdel Hamid: Cairo teacher (1979) (God Fights Back)
- Mahmoud: Cairo plasterer (1978) (God Fights Back)
- Yasser Tawfiq: Cairo preacher (1980) (God Fights Back)

== French ==
- Raymond Abescat: (born 1891) Paris Exhibition attendee (Age of Hope)
- Marcel Batreau: World War I and II soldier (Killing Fields, Lost Peace)
- Maurice Bourgeois: (born 1896) schoolboy (1905) (Age of Hope)
- Alice Clousier: (born 1894) Paris Exhibition attendee (Age of Hope)
- Etienne Crouy Chanel: aide to Édouard Daladier (Lost Peace)
- Jean Dubertret: Douai resident (1949) (Boomtime)
- Monette Gaunt: Paris resident (Boomtime)
- Romain Goupil: May 1968 protestor (New Release)
- Arthur Herbaux: Renault production worker (1932) (On the Line)
- Raymond Jolivet: Bourges farmboy (1949) (Boomtime)
- Evelyne Langey: Paris resident (1946) (Boomtime)
- Michel Lequenne: French resistance member (1943) (Great Escape)
- Roger Lorelliere: Renault worker and May 1968 protestor (New Release)
- Jeanne Plouvin: witnessed first Trans-channel flight in 1909 (Age of Hope)
- Zenaide Provins: Renault production worker (On the Line)
- Hermine Venot-Focke: World War I nurse (Killing Fields)

== Georgians ==
- Endar Shengelai: film director (People Power)

== Germans ==
- Peter Bielenburg: member of anti-Nazi resistance (Master Race)
- Gerda Bodenheimer: Jewish Berlin resident (Master Race)
- Hans Brunswig: Hamburg fireman (1943) (Total War)
- Karl von Clemm: World War I artillerist (Killing Fields)
- Anna-Maria Ernst: gypsy Auschwitz survivor (Master Race)
- Luise Essig: Agriculture Ministry education worker (1937–1945) (Master Race)
- Josef Felder: Social Democratic Party of Germany parliamentarian (1933) (Master Race)
- Mike Frohnel: East German hospital worker (People Power)
- Herta Grabarz: Lower Saxony villager (Master Race)
- Jurgen Kroeger: Einsatzgruppen interpreter (1942) (Master Race)
- Ilsa Kruger: Berlin resident (1945) (Brave New World)
- Harald Jäger: East German border guard (People Power)
- Hanne-Lore Lutgering: League of German Girls member (Master Race)
- Hans Margules: Jewish art student, later worker at Auschwitz (Master Race)
- Anita Moller: Berlin tunnel escapee (1961) (Brave New World)
- Hans Münch: SS doctor at Auschwitz (1942) (Master Race)
- Karl Nagerl: Munich schoolboy (1924), later soldier (1938) (Lost Peace)
- Karl-Henning Oldekop: World War I infantryman (Killing Fields)
- Dietmar Passenheim: East German transport police officer (People Power)
- Marie Rau: daughter of euthanised schizophrenic (Master Race)
- Barbel Reinke: East German waitress (People Power)
- Fritz Schilgen: Berlin Olympics torch lighter (Sporting Fever)
- Horst Slesina: Propaganda Ministry worker (1934–1945) (Master Race)
- Friedl Sonnenberg: young girl (1933) (Master Race)
- Reinhard Spitzy: SS officer (1931–45) (Master Race)
- Margarethe Stahl: child who witnessed outbreak of the First World War (Killing Fields)
- George Stege: Volkswagen factory worker (1955) (Boomtime)
- Ernst Weckerling: World War I officer (Killing Fields)
- Horst Westphal: Hamburg schoolboy (1942) (Total War)
- Mercedes Wild: Berlin child (1945) (Brave New World)
- Ilse Woile: League of German Girls member (Master Race)
- Margarette Zettel: Hamburg tram conductor, then civil defence worker (1943)(Total War)

== Ghanaians ==
- Geoffrey Aduamah: war veteran (1947), later lawyer (1958) (Freedom Now)
- Anim Assiful: cocoa farmer (1950) (Freedom Now)
- Eddie Francois: civil servant (1960) (Freedom Now)
- Komla Gbedema: vice chairman, Convention People's Party (1950) (Freedom Now)
- E. T. Mensah: musician (1957) (Freedom Now)
- Beatrice Quatey: market stall keeper (1960) (Freedom Now)

== Hungarians ==
- Gergely Pongratz: independence fighter (Brave New World)

== Indians ==
- Anil Agarwal: journalist (1972) (Endangered Planet)
- Rahmat Bano: Jaipur television viewer (Picture Power)
- Bikarma: smallpox sufferer (Living Longer)
- Amravati Devi: villager (Living Longer)
- Mukesh Gupta: smelter owner (Endangered Planet)
- Buddu Harku: cataract sufferer (Living Longer)
- Zafar Husain: smallpox campaigner (1968) (Living Longer)
- Birenda Kaur: student (1947) (Freedom Now)
- Cha Kunga: World War I labourer (Killing Fields)
- Peter Morris: Bangalore medical scribe (Fast Forward)
- Vishnu Ogale: sterilised father (Living Longer)
- Dutta Pai: family planning doctor (Living Longer)
- Teju Raghuvir: Uttar Pradesh villager (Living Longer)
- Bhairu Ram: Jaipur television viewer (Picture Power)
- Rajam Ramanathan: Bangalore film viewer (Great Escape)
- Satpal Saini: farmer (1947) (Freedom Now)
- Bano Shamshaad: Bhopal resident (1984) (Endangered Planet)
- Asha Singh: villager (Living Longer)

== Iranians ==
- Hadi Gaffari: mullah (1978) (God Fights Back)
- Mohammed Shah Hossein: Tehran carpenter (1978) (God Fights Back)
- Zeynab Jalili: (Half the People)
- Darioush Keshuarpad: student (1971) (God Fights Back)
- Maloud Khanlary: schoolgirl (1936) (Half the People, God Fights Back)
- Saeed Manesh: schoolboy (1979), later soldier (God Fights Back)
- Soroor Moradi Nazari: Tehran resident (1975) (God Fights Back)
- Mohsen Rafighdoost: Ayatollah Ruhollah Khomeini's driver (God Fights Back)
- Mashid Amir Shahy: physics student (1979) (Half the People)

== Italians ==
- Evio Barretti: Pontedera Vespa factory worker (1958) (Boomtime)
- Duilia Bartoli: film viewer (Great Escape)
- Luigi Cavaliere: projectionist (Great Escape)
- Gerardo Ciola: Naples resident (1946) (Boomtime)
- Edda Furlan: Pordenone factory worker (1963) (Boomtime)
- Felice Gentile: Fiat worker (1936) (On the Line)
- Giovanni Gobbi: Fiat worker (1926) (On the Line)
- Don Giovanni Lano: Turin priest (1963) (Boomtime)
- Franco Ricci: film viewer (1925) (Great Escape)
- Lisetta Salis: Rome resident (Great Escape)
- Giovanni de Stefanis: Turin factoryworker (1949) (Boomtime)

== Japanese ==
- Kinnojo Abe: bed salesman (1965) (Asia Rising)
- Tsuginori Hanamoto: Minamata Bay fisherman (1959), later patients leader (1973) (Endangered Planet)
- Yoshiko Hashimoto: Tokyo resident (Total War, Asia Rising)
- Akira Ishida: Hiroshima atom bomb survivor (Fallout)
- Tomiji Matsuda: victim of Minamata Bay accident (Endangered Planet)
- Sumiko Morikawa: Tokyo resident (1944) (Total War)
- Hakudo Nagatomi: soldier (Total War)
- Jun Nagasawa: guitarist, The Three Funkies (1958) (Asia Rising)
- Miyoshi Ohba: rural health worker (1946) (Asia Rising)
- Matashichi Oshi: Lucky Dragon crewmember (1954) (Fallout)
- Katsumoto Saotome: schoolboy (1944) (Total War)
- Nobuko Sato: Tokyo resident (1965) (Asia Rising)
- Taisuke Sato: Tokyo resident (1965) (Asia Rising)
- Hisako Sugawara: Sony factory worker (1963) (Asia Rising)
- Kuniyuki Takeshita: Minamata Chisso plant manager (Endangered Planet)
- Sumiteru Taniguchi: Hiroshima atom bomb survivor (Fallout)
- Mohei Tamura: (born 1890) salesman (Age of Hope)
- Yoshihiro Yamashita: Chisso employee (1956) (Endangered Planet)
- Suezo Uchida: Nagasaki shipbuilder (1954) (Asia Rising)

== Kenyans ==
- Waijwa Theuri: Mau Mau fighter (1953) (Freedom Now)
- Wangugu Gitchonga: detainee (1953) (Freedom Now)
- Syvia Richardson: British settler (1953) (Freedom Now)

== Koreans ==
- Yeon Bong Hak: Pohang Steel employee (Asia Rising)
- Park Dae Hyun: teacher (1972) (Asia Rising)
- Yi Chong Kak: textile worker, then union leader (Asia Rising)
- Kim Bok Soon: housekeeper (1953), then New Community Movement activist (1971) (Asia Rising)
- Jang Chang Sun: wrestler at the Tokyo Olympics (Asia Rising)
- Yan Pyon Tou: forced labourer (Total War)
- Kwak Man Young: student (1951), then highway engineer (1969) (Asia Rising)

== Israelis ==
- Dora (Dvora) Schwartz: Holocaust survivor (Master Race)

== Lithuanians ==
- Zvi Michaeli: Holocaust survivor (Master Race)

== Mexicans ==
- Serafina Gallardo: shanty town dweller (1994) (Half the People)

== Mozambiquans ==
- Xadreque Paulino Sarea: Frelimo fighter (1970) (Freedom Now)
- Leia Isaia Mbazima: cotton worker (1947) (Freedom Now)

== Pakistanis ==
- Tahir Kazi: Rawalpindi shopkeeper (1981) (God Fights Back)
- Shazia Lal: schoolgirl (1981) (God Fights Back)

== Palestinians ==
- Abu Daoud: Black September leader (Picture Power)

== Peruvians ==
- Luis Correa Camacho: mayor of Otuzco (1991) (Living Longer)
- Maria Llanos Rudas: wife of cholera victim (Living Longer)

== Poles ==
- Henryka Kryzwonos: Gdańsk tram driver and Solidarność leader (People Power)

== Romanians ==
- Ioan Banciu: Timișoara engineer (People Power)
- Mihai Radu: student (People Power)
- Ioan Savu: Timișoara chemical worker (People Power)
- Steliana Stefonoiu: Bucharest television viewer (Picture Power)

== Russians ==
- Lev Altshuller: nuclear scientist (1947) (Fallout)
- Alyosha: Saint Petersburg street kid (Fast Forward)
- Mikhail Arkhipov: Magnitogorsk volunteer (Red Flag)
- Tamara Banketik: child presenter (Brave New World)
- Oleg Blotski: platoon commander (1986) (War of the Flea)
- Alexander Briansky: revolutionary in 1905 and 1917 (Age of Hope, Red Flag)
- Arkadi Brish: nuclear scientist (1947) (Fallout)
- Izo Degtyar: musician (Red Flag)
- Anastasia Denisova: literacy campaign worker (1924) (Red Flag)
- Sergey Evdokimov: anti-putschist tank brigade commander (People Power)
- Tatiana Fedeorova': labourer (1932), then Soviet parliamentarian (1937) (Red Flag)
- Nina Fedorovna: Kirov Plant inspector, later unemployed (Fast Forward)
- Leonid Galperin: Road of Life commandant (1942) (Total War)
- Dasha Khubova: student? (People Power)
- Max Kleinman: factory worker, then World War I infantryman (Age of Hope, Killing Fields)
- Alexei Kozlov: jazz musician (Brave New World)
- Stanislava Kraskovskaya: (born 1897) witnessed pogroms in Russia (Age of Hope)
- Natasha Kuznetsova: Moscow resident (People Power)
- Anna Larina: wife of Nikolai Bukharin (Red Flag)
- Nikolai Lukianov: revolutionary in 1905 (Age of Hope)
- Evgeny Mahayev: fishmonger (People Power)
- Ksenya Matus: Leningrad Radio Orchestra oboist (Total War)
- Mikhail Midlin: Konsomolol member (1924), later purged (Red Flag)
- Valentina Mikova: Magnitogorsk party worker (Red Flag)
- Nina Motova: Ballbearing factory worker (People Power)
- Mikhail Rozenthal: World War I soldier (Killing Fields)
- Oleg Rumiantsev: Kirov Plant worker, later entrepreneur (Fast Forward)
- Alexandra Sakharova: forced labourer (1942) (Total War)
- Anatoly Semiriaga: Soviet Army captain, then major (Brave New World)
- Ella Shistyer: student (1923), then electrical engineer, later purged (Red Flag)
- Alexandr Silvashko: Soviet Army lieutenant (1945) (Brave New World)
- Elena Taranukhina: Leningrad resident (1941) (Total War)
- Boris Yefimov: Pravda cartoonist (Red Flag)
- Lubov Zhakova: Leningrad resident (Total War)

== Senegalese ==
- Amadou Barro Diene: student (1958) (Freedom Now)
- Majhemout Diop: party activist (1958) (Freedom Now)

== Somalis ==
- Ali Maalin: last smallpox sufferer (Living Longer)

== South Africans ==
- Magdeline Chosane: Soweto schoolgirl (1976)
- Justina Coha: East London nurse (1959) (Skin Deep)
- Christine Hadebe: Johannesburg maid (1950s) (Skin Deep)
- John Kani: actor (Skin Deep)
- M P Lombaard: civil servant (1959) (Skin Deep)
- Moira Mbelu: Soweto schoolgirl (1976) (Skin Deep)
- Amos Msimanga: African National Congress member (Skin Deep)
- Ray Mahlambeni: Pan African Congress member (Skin Deep)
- Mbongeni Ndlovu: Johannesburg resident (Skin Deep)
- Dorah Ramothibe: (born 1881, oldest interviewee) Transvaal farmworker (Age of Hope)
- Eric Rothele: Soweto schoolboy (1976) (Skin Deep)
- Nico Smith: theology student (1948) (Skin Deep)
- Tournament Vusani: General Motors worker (1985) (Skin Deep)

== Sudanese ==
- John Robien Ayai: amputee convict (God Fights Back)

== Swedes ==
- Göta Rosén: Social Democrats member (Breadline)

== Turks ==
- Serodor Peliganovlu: schoolboy (1925) (God Fights Back)

== Ukrainians ==
- Izrail Chernitsky: young communist (1928) (Red Flag)
- Pelageya Ovcharenko: peasant (1928) (Red Flag)
- Veniamin Prianichnikov: Chernobyl engineer (1986) (Fallout)
- Valery Staradumov: Chernobyl scientist (1986) (Fallout)

== Uruguayans ==
- Diego Lucero: football journalist (1930) (Sporting Fever)
- Ondino Viera: Football coach (1930) (Sporting Fever)

== Vietnamese ==
- Nguyen Thi Be: child guerrilla (War of the Flea)
- Phan Dien: Viet Cong local leader (1960) (War of the Flea)
- Võ Nguyên Giáp: Việt Minh leader (1954) (War of the Flea)
- Tran Thi Gung: Viet Cong guerrilla (1963) (War of the Flea)
- Chau Van Nhat: farmer (War of the Flea)
- Lam Van Phan: North Vietnamese spy (1963) (War of the Flea)
- Lâm Văn Phát: South Vietnam army general (1963) (War of the Flea)
