= People's Century =

- Genre: Documentary
- Theme music composer: Zbigniew Preisner
- Country of origin: United Kingdom
- Original language: English

Production
- Executive producers: Peter Pagnamenta; Zvi Dor-Ner
- Producer: David Espar
- Production companies: BBC; WGBH Boston

Original release
- Network: BBC One
- Release: 13 September 1995 – 23 February 1997

People's Century is a television documentary series examining the 20th century. It was a joint production of the BBC in the United Kingdom and PBS member station WGBH Boston in the United States. The series was first shown on BBC in the 1995, 1996 and 1997 television seasons before being broadcast in the US and elsewhere in the world in 1998.

== Premise ==
The 26 one-hour episodes examined the socio-economic, political, and cultural movements that shaped the 20th century. The series represented a departure from documentaries that present history through recounting the actions of great men; People's Century considers the century from the perspective of common people. Most of those interviewed were ordinary men and women who closely witnessed various events and who give personal accounts of the manner in which the developments and disruptions of the 20th century affected their lives.

The British version was narrated by Sean Barrett and Veronika Hyks, the American version by actors John Forsythe and Alfre Woodard. People's Century was co-produced by the BBC and WGBH with executive producers Peter Pagnamenta and Zvi Dor-Ner, respectively, along with producer David Espar.

The opening credits depict various images from the century, accompanied with a theme music score by Zbigniew Preisner. The documentary won an International Emmy Award, among others.

=== International versions ===
People's Century was broadcast in several non-English-speaking countries, including Norway (with subtitles, as is normal on Norwegian television). In Germany, the series was dubbed, under its English title, on VOX as a weekly feature on a 4-to-6h slot called DCTP Nachtclub with several episodes in each slot, as part of the channel's Spiegel TV documentaries programme co-operation with Der Spiegel. A Swiss-produced VHS set was released of the German-dubbed version under the title Chronik des 20. Jahrhunderts. The German dub also ran on Austrian and Swiss television.

=== Interviewees ===
- List of People's Century interviewees

== The series ==
=== Season 1 (1995) ===
Episode	Title	Year	Information	UK Broadcast Date	USA Broadcast Date
1	Age of Hope	1900	At the beginning of the twentieth century the world was stable and certain, but unequal. The Paris Exhibition of 1900 symbolises the optimism of a peaceful age when affluence is rising and people have faith in new technologies like electricity. The United States slowly overtakes the United Kingdom as the world's foremost power, and becomes the dream destination for many European immigrants. Compulsory education in many countries had led to a literate population exposed to new ideas, leisure and consumerism through newspapers. Trade unions grow in strength and force governments to protect employment conditions for workers, while suffragettes push for votes for women. Revolutions shake the political order in China and Russia. European empires continue to dominate the globe, however signs of dissent appear in India and South Africa, and Japan's victory over Russia in 1905 challenges the belief of white superiority. Nationalism rises in Europe, bringing the continent to conflict in 1914.	13 September 1995	19 April 1998
2	Killing Fields	(UK: 1914) (US: 1916)	The Great War is fought with larger armies and deadlier weapons than ever before, bringing death and carnage on an unprecedented scale to Europe. The bloody Battle of the Somme and the Battle of Verdun fail to break a stalemate on the Western front, and soldiers become increasingly frustrated and demoralised with the war's mounting casualties, poor living conditions and lack of progress. World War I's propaganda began for the first time in 1916. Despite the October Revolution knocking Russia out of the war in 1917, the odds shift against a blockaded Germany with the entry of the United States into the war, and eventually an armistice is signed. The psychological scars of this war would make the public less willing in future to go to war, or trust their leaders. The introductory scene shows soldiers mobilising at the beginning of the war, grossly under-estimating the destructive power of modern warfare. Interviewees include Karl von Clemm, Edward Smout and Cecil Lewis.	20 September 1995	19 April 1998
3	Red Flag	1917	The October Revolution brings forth a new Marxist–Leninist society in what becomes the Soviet Union. Its people, now freed from feudal exploitation and provided with health care and education from the state, have their revolutionary zeal directed towards developing and modernising their new country. However, after Vladimir Lenin's death Joseph Stalin rules with an iron fist – his attempts to collectivise farms leads to the Ukrainian famine and the mass liquidation of kulaks. Stalin grows increasingly paranoid and ruthless, and is responsible for the deaths or expulsion to Siberia of millions of Soviets. The introductory scene explains the events leading up to the 1917 revolution. Interviewees include Anna Larina and Boris Yefimov	27 September 1995	20 April 1998
4	Lost Peace	1919	The trauma of the First World War gives Europe no appetite for any further conflicts, but within subsequent two decades the world would return to rearmament and militarism. The Paris Peace Conference introduced the concept of self-determination, leading to the establishment of Czechoslovakia, Poland and Yugoslavia from the former Central Powers. The League of Nations is established to assist in resolving international disputes in an open environment, but fails to receive strong support and is eventually proven impotent in preventing Italy's conquest of Ethiopia. Despite a public push for disarmament, prompted by All Quiet on the Western Front and other reminders of the First World War, few countries make any serious moves. French and British demands for heavy war reparations, lead to Germany's economic ruin, but this and other unforeseen consequences of the Treaty of Versailles would result in the emergence of Adolf Hitler. As Germany begins to absorb its neighbours, the rest of Europe mobilises, and the moral utility of pacifism is questioned. The introductory scene shows Armistice Day. Interviewees include Lord Soper.	4 October 1995	8 June 1998
5	Sporting Fever	1930	Once an amateur pursuit, sport becomes larger and more competitiveness to satisfy the public's need for excitement and identity. Communities unite behind favoured sporting clubs, as are entire countries that support their national teams against rivals. From the 1908 Olympics onwards, countries increasingly stake national pride on the successes of their athletes. Football, tennis, boxing and baseball attract millions of fans, and in turn are increasingly commercialised for a wider audience. Nazi Germany seeks to exploit the 1936 Berlin Olympics and the Joe Louis vs. Max Schmeling bouts for propaganda purposes, with mixed results. The introductory scene shows the 1930 FIFA World Cup, won by Uruguay against its arch-rival Argentina. Interviewees include Eddie Futch, Robert Mitchell, Helen Stephens and Fritz Schilgen.	11 October 1995	21 April 1998
6	On the Line	(1924: UK) (1926: US)	Henry Ford uses Taylorism, division of labour and the assembly line to manufacture automobiles, and other industries in the United States, as well as Britain, France, Italy, Soviet Union and elsewhere follow his example. The productivity dividends that are gained allow American workers to enjoy high pay and affordable consumer goods as compensation. However workers become increasingly frustrated from the physically demanding and alienating aspects of the assembly line (depicted in Modern Times, Brave New World and À nous la liberté). The Great Depression weakens worker bargaining power, but after a series of strikes in the 1930s and 1940s trade unions emerge victorious, and instruments like the Matignon Agreements in France are established to buttress workers' rights.	18 October 1995	25 May 1998
7	Great Escape	1927	The cinema excites, inspires and influences people seeking escape from their usually dull lives. Hollywood booms in the 1920s, and its movies dominate European screens after the Second World War, bringing alluring images of America. Censorship is introduced after concerns are raised of cinema's perceived effect on morals. Television will however cut short cinema's future, in the west. Clips shown in this episode come from silent films (Salome, Raja Harishchandra, Cinderella, Son of the Sheik, Sherlock Jr. and Dr. Jekyll and Mr. Hyde), musicals (Achut Kanya, Sing As We Go, Flying Down to Rio, The Stars Shine, On the Town, Chandralekha and Mother India), propaganda films (Earth, The Sea Hawk, Know Your Enemy: Japan, The Fall of Berlin and Luciano Serra pilota), and films with allegorical messages (Les Visiteurs du Soir, Ladri di biciclette and Meet Mr. Lucifer). The introductory scene shows audience observing the first sound film, The Jazz Singer.	25 October 1995	21 April 1998
8	Breadline	1929	The economic boom of the Roaring Twenties comes to a sudden halt in 1929 and the subsequent Great Depression. In the years after a demoralised army of 13 million unemployed Americans are left idle. As incomes and trade are reduced, the recession spreads to the Jarrow shipyards to the nitrates and copper mines of Chile. In afflicted countries there are attentive audiences to solutions proffered by the extreme left and right to fixing a problem apparently caused by the market economy, although Sweden adopts a novel approach through establishing the welfare state. President Hoover's crackdown on the Bonus Army, a large group of protesting unemployed veterans in Washington, leads to his political demise. His replacement, President Roosevelt, confronts the problem by initiating ambitious public works programs, which helps stimulate the economy. Britain's economy comes out of recession in the late 1930s, thanks to the need to build up its Navy against a looming threat from Germany. One legacy of the breadline is that people will now demand action from their governments to intervene in the market. The opening scene shows the Wall Street crash.	1 November 1995	1 June 1998
9	Master Race	1933	The Third Reich brings barbarity to the modern era. Germany is rebuilt through huge public works program, winning Hitler adulation from a once humiliated, impoverished and unemployed German people. Radio and mass rallies become important tools for propaganda, to eulogise the Germans as a 'master race'. The Nazis also use ancient jealousies to demonise the Jews, who had a strong presence in the professions and arts. Romani, the mentally handicapped and other groups are also targeted. The Nuremberg Laws and other measures are used to progressively discriminate against and dehumanise Jews. Persecution of the Jews intensifies after Anschluss and Kristallnacht, and after the commencement of war, the Final Solution is implemented. The mass murder of Jews and other people is carried out at first by mobile killing groups (Einsatzgruppen) in occupied territories, and then on an industrialised scale through extermination camps. The introductory scene shows the celebratory march by the Sturmabteilung when Hitler wins power in Germany on 30 January 1933. Interviewees include Reinhard Spitzy, who served in the SS for 14 years, Peter Bielenberg, an anti-Nazi activist (whose English-born mother, Christabel Bielenberg, had herself been an interviewee in several episodes of the Thames television series The World at War in the 1970s), Zvi Michaeli, who at the age of 16 survived a massacre in occupied Lithuania, Dora Schwartz, who managed to avoid being gassed at Auschwitz when she was picked out by a German member of staff as being fit to work, and Hans Münch, an SS doctor who witnessed executions of Jews in the gas chambers at Auschwitz at first hand. Uniquely for an episode of this series, the closing credits did not feature the rolling street scene normally seen at both the beginning and end of episodes, rather a completely black background intended as a visual "memorial" to all those who died at the hands of the Nazis because they "didn't fit in with German racial policy".	8 November 1995	15 June 1998
10	Total War	1939	The Second World War enmeshes civilians to the horrors of war on an unprecedented scale. Germany and Japan, in seeking living space, kill and enslave entire populations in the Soviet Union and Asia respectively. Initially considered barbarous, people begin to accept as fair game the aerial bombing of civilian populations, and escalating calls for retaliation bring destruction to cities including Plymouth, Hamburg and Tokyo. Civilians are also in the front line in the Siege of Leningrad, but despite hardships, its orchestra manages to perform Shostakovich's Symphony No. 7. The mobilisation of civilians in the United States and elsewhere gives the allies quantitative superiority in the production of armaments, and ultimately victory. The introductory scene shows prescient footage of aerial bombing in the 1936 film Things to Come	15 November 1995	22 June 1998

=== Season 2 (1996) ===
Episode	Title	Year	Information	UK Broadcast Date	USA Broadcast Date
11	Brave New World	1945	Despite being allies against Hitler, disagreement and rivalry soon break out between the Soviet Union and the West, leading to the Cold War. The Soviet Union installs puppet regimes across Eastern Europe with planned economies, prompting Churchill to deliver his Iron Curtain speech. Both sides increasingly distrusts the other, and use propaganda to promote their cause. In 1949 McCarthyism and the Mosinee mock Soviet coup demonstrate US anxiety about communism following Soviet acquisition of the atom bomb and the victory of communism in China. The Berlin Blockade, the Korean War and the Hungarian Revolution of 1956 become flashpoints, although both sides eventually begin to believe in peaceful coexistence and accept a division of spheres of influence. The Soviet Bloc remains wary of the influence of Western ideas and its superior standard of living, and in 1962 reinforces its divide with the West by building the Berlin Wall. The introductory scene shows the fracternal relationship that had existed between Soviet and Western forces when they finally met in Germany in 1945. Interviewees include Manny Fried and Gail Halverson	15 September 1996	29 June 1998
12	Boomtime	1948	Europe is exhausted and impoverished in the years after the Second World War. The United States implements the Marshall Plan to rebuild Western Europe, partially out of generosity, and partially to keep in check communism. Despite some misgivings, the Europeans are generally grateful – tractors increase food supplies, and American training and support builds up Europe's heavy industry. Productive industrial sectors help the United States enjoy an unrivalled standard of living throughout the 1950s and 1960s, with living transformed through automobiles, supermarkets and Levittowns. European managers adopt US manufacturing methods and Europe begins to manufacture, and then export, its own consumer goods. Labour shortages lead to the employment of women and migrant workers. The West enjoys high wages and low unemployment until the 1970s energy crisis. The opening scene shows the Friendship Train travelling through the United States around Christmas 1947, collecting charity to send to Europe.	22 September 1996	14 June 1999
13	Freedom Now	1947	European powers are forced to relinquish their colonies in Africa following the Second World War, but in most cases the newly independent countries would eventually succumb to poverty, civil war and despotic regimes. India's independence motivates a generation of war veterans from Africa, who for the first time have travelled the world, to seek greater autonomy for their own countries. The Europeans are at first reluctant to surrender colonies that supports their prosperity, although Asia is decolonised in the 1950s. The British give reforms to the Gold Coast (now Ghana), which under Kwame Nkrumah would lead the way to independence, and ultimately become an example to the rest of Africa. Kenya's path to independence would not be without blood, and the British fight the Mau Mau to protect the numerically small white population. France and Portugal both struggle to keep their colonies. Within three years, 25 African states would become independent from their colonial masters, but tribal hatreds, corruption, a lack of a skilled workforce and internal conflict often lead these countries to ruin. The introductory scene shows India's path towards independence. Interviewees include Komla Gbedema and E. T. Mensah.	29 September 1996	6 July 1998
14	Fallout	1945	Nuclear weapons make the world more dangerous than ever before. The destruction of Hiroshima and Nagasaki in 1945 by atom bombs is hailed for ending the Second World War, but the long-term effects of radiation are discovered years later. To ensure parity with the US, Stalin puts his scientists to work and four years later the Soviet Union explodes its first nuclear bomb, starting an arms race between the superpowers in which peace is maintained through the doctrine of mutually assured destruction. Governments take steps to protect its citizens through civil defence. Popular movements calling for nuclear disarmament appear in force from the late 1950s, and the expensive arms race is eventually stopped in the 1980s. Nuclear power supports economic growth and technological advances, but the Chernobyl disaster in 1986, as well as the impact of nuclear testing in Utah and Bikini Atoll, keep the public at large distrustful of nuclear science. The opening scene shows the preparation and execution of the world's first nuclear test in New Mexico, United States.	6 October 1996	15 June 1999
15	Asia Rising	1951	Through thrift, hard work and discipline, Japan and later South Korea enjoy economic miracles that bring growth, prosperity and confidence to their once war-ravaged and impoverished people. In Japan the Korean War kickstarts manufacturing, and growth is sustained through export-orientated industries using Western technologies and production methods, and assisted by a dedicated, highly educated labour force strongly committed to improving their country. In the 1960s President Park Chung Hee largely followed Japan 's economic policies in steering South Korea's stellar economic development, but was far more ruthless to dissent and labour movements. The peoples of both countries eventually enjoy the consumer items as the fruits of their efforts, and their personal attitudes change as a result. The introductory scene shows the end of US occupation in Japan.	13 October 1996	16 June 1999
16	Skin Deep	1957	Through nonviolent and more direct methods, people rally to fight segregation in South Africa, and several states in the United States. In the United States state President Eisenhower uses federal troops to uphold the Constitutional rights of African American students during the Little Rock integration crisis. This action emboldens the civil rights movement to further confront Jim Crow laws through the sit-ins, the Freedom Rides, the March on Washington and the Selma to Montgomery marches. In South Africa from 1948 white supremacy is vigorously enforced through apartheid, pass laws, the Group Areas Act and other measures as well as other petty apartheid with legal recourse to protest denied. Incidents in Sharpeville and Soweto catalyse the grievances of Africans into direct action, forcing the Government to eventually negotiate with the ANC, free Nelson Mandela and hold South Africa's first democratic election in 1994.	20 October 1996	17 June 1999
17	Endangered Planet	1959	Rising consumption patterns extract a huge toll on nature. Toxic contamination in Minamata and Love Canal and the Torrey Canyon and Amoco Cadiz oil slicks prompt public awareness about the planet's vulnerabilities, influenced by scientists including Rachel Carson and Paul Ehrlich. Following Earth Day in 1970 governments take resolute measures to mitigate pollution, such as through the Stockholm Conference as well as domestic measures like the Clean Air Act in the United States. Environmentalism emerges as a political force, championed by Greenpeace, Chipko and other organisations. In the 1980s new challenges emerge including global warming and acid rain, and the increasing size of industrial facilities make disasters like Bhopal and Chernobyl more deadly. Pressure was also being applied from newly developing countries. Interviewees include Lois Gibbs and Robert Hunter.	27 October 1996	15 June 1999
18	Picture Power	1963	Governments, advertisers and revolutionaries seek to exploit television's ability to instantly communicate compelling messages to mass audiences. Television allows people to vividly witness Queen Elizabeth's Coronation, the 1960 US presidential election, the Moon landing, the Munich Olympics, the Tienanmen Square Massacre, the Romanian Revolution of 1989 and the Gulf War. Advertising, education programs, and series like Ramayan, Dallas and Oshin influence society by changing perceptions and habits. The introductory scene showed the impact of television in communicating the news of the assassination of President Kennedy. Interviewees include Abu Daoud and Don Hewitt.	3 November 1996	21 June 1999

=== Season 3 (1997) ===
Episode	Title	Year	Information	UK Broadcast Date	USA Broadcast Date
19	Living Longer	(1952: UK) (1954: US)	Medical advances allow people to live longer and healthier lives. Penicillin is developed in time to save lives during the Second World War. After the war, national public health institutions are established, and national and international efforts are directed towards treatments against infectious diseases, including typhus, tuberculosis, and polio. Smallpox, the scourge of developing countries, is also eradicated. As deaths from infectious diseases are reduced, population booms in those developing countries with high birth rates – China and India – take measures to promote family planning. Cholera becomes a risk in countries with insufficient sanitation to prevent water-borne diseases. AIDS spreads in Africa and elsewhere, and unlike other diseases appears untreatable. By the 1990s health in the developing world has much improved, and reduced infant mortality rates have lowered birth rates across the world. The introductory scene shows the United States in the 1950s when polio was prevalent.	5 January 1997	21 June 1999
20	Great Leap (UK) / Great Leap Forward (US)	(UK: 1949) (US: 1965)	Communism helps modernise China, but the decisions and personality cult of CCP Chairman Mao Zedong has a traumatic effect on Chinese society. Mao's Chinese Communist Party (CCP) defeats the Chinese nationalists after co-opting the support of China's peasantry. Driven by ideological fervor, the Chinese people are mobilised to develop the country, although many ill-considered initiatives like the Great sparrow campaign and the Great Leap Forward bring famine and chaos to China. Mao directs mass movements to attack what he perceived were disloyal or ideologically impure elements in China, in particular during the Cultural Revolution. Order is only effectively restored to China following Mao's death in 1976, when CCP Vice Chairman Deng Xiaoping takes a more practical approach to ruling China. The introductory scene shows Mao proclaiming the People's Republic of China in Tiananmen Square in 1949.	12 January 1997	16 June 1999
21	New Release (UK) / Young Blood (US)	1968	The baby boom produced a cohort of children in the affluent and secure post-war world who for the first time would question established trends, culture and authority. Young adults were denied the right to vote, and lived in a paternalistic society that discouraged them from interacting with authority. Their rising disposable incomes were channelled into new music and fashions that helped provide them with a new common identity. Greater student populations, disillusionment with conformist trends, identification with civil rights issues and concern about the Vietnam War (where some youth were at risk of being drafted to) led to widespread protests in the West. A counterculture of drugs and hippies also emerged amongst the less engaged. Protests against authority emerges across the world with varying results – the May 1968 student uprising in France is curtailed by pragmatic workers not wishing to become involved, while crackdowns at the Chicago Convention and Kent State University radicalise previously peaceful demonstrators in the United States. From the 1970s, following the end of US involvement in Vietnam, tighter employment conditions and the emergence of a more consultative culture in the West, youth find less reasons to protest.	19 January 1997	14 June 1999
22	Half the People	1970	Women struggle to win political and economic rights in societies gamed to entrench male privilege. Even with limited suffrage, after the First World War many Western women remain destined to a life of domestic servitude or limited careers. The Second World War gives women in Britain and the United States a brief opportunity to work in traditionally male industries, but they are promptly replaced at war's end. In the 1960s, new household appliances, higher education, and the book The Feminine Mystique inspires campaigns for equal pay and employment opportunities, such as the Dagenham strike. However, women would still need to struggle against discrimination and harassment in male-dominated careers. The pill helps women gain control of their fertility. In less developed places of the world, there are other issues of concern to women, including genital mutilation, dowry killings and infanticide; while in Iran, a legacy of gender equality is rolled back after the Islamic Revolution. The Fourth World Conference on Women shows how the aspirations and achievements for women vary between rich and poor countries. The introductory scene shows the 1970 Women's Strike for Equality. Interviewees include Jacqui Ceballos and Mary Stott.	25 January 1997	17 June 1999
23	War of the Flea (UK) / Guerrilla Wars (US)	(1975: UK) (1973: US)	While in the second half of the century there are fewer conventional wars, civil conflicts under the backdrop of superpower rivalries emerge, fought by ideologically driven guerrilla movements. While usually being small and poorly armed, their motivation, self-belief and their abilities to co-opt popular support and exploit terrain to their own advantage prove to be key factors why several guerrilla movements are successful. With only a very small band of determined supporters, Fidel Castro manages to eventually overthrow Fulgencio Batista in the Cuban Revolution. After the French are defeated by the Việt Minh in Vietnam, the Americans deploy in huge numbers, however their technological prowess, industrial might and Hearts and Minds campaigns cannot defeat the Viet Cong. Similarly in Afghanistan, the Soviets are forced to pull out by the US-armed Mujahideen. The introductory scene shows the fall of Saigon. Interviewees include Ahmed Shah Masoud, General Võ Nguyên Giáp, and Colonel David Hackworth.	2 February 1997	28 June 1999
24	God Fights Back	1979	Religion makes a comeback into people's lives in the Islamic world and elsewhere, as people seek guidance and spiritual sustenance during periods of modernisation and social upheaval. Starting in Turkey under Atatürk, throughout the Islamic world governments introduce Western technology, fashion and culture to modernise and strengthen their countries. However, public perceptions, that commercialism and secularism are leading a breakdown in Islamic values, galvanise Islamist movements in Egypt, Sudan, Pakistan, and even Turkey. The greatest transformation of society takes place following the Islamic Revolution in Iran, where Sharia law, sex segregation and veils are (re)introduced, and similar measures are adopted elsewhere. Religious fundamentalism also surfaces in the United States, Israel and India. The introductory scene features the Shah of Iran showcasing his country in 1971, and his departure in 1979.	9 February 1997	28 June 1999
25	People Power	1989	By the 1970s the people in the Soviet Union and Eastern Europe were becoming aware of the economic failures of central planning. Propaganda and an intrusive security apparatus were now needed to maintain control, particularly after the appearance of Western consumer goods and culture in the Eastern Bloc, and Pope John Paul II's visit to Poland, raised public discontent with their entrenched governments. From 1985 new Soviet general secretary Mikhail Gorbachev introduces reforms to encourage openness and initiative to stop stagnation. Gorbachev also allows Eastern Europe to set their own destinies. In 1989, Hungary begins dismantling the Iron Curtain and Poland holds free elections; the absence of a Soviet response encourages people in the more hard-line states of East Germany, Czechoslovakia and Romania to eventually overthrow their leaders. Gorbachev's reforms triggers an unsuccessful coup in 1991, eventually leading to the end of the Communist Party and the dissolution of the Soviet Union. The introductory scene shows the fall of the Berlin Wall.	16 February 1997	20 April 1998
26	Fast Forward (UK) / Back to The Future (US)	1997	Governments around the world liberalise trade and withdraw from intervening in the economy, giving new opportunities to those who are skilled, industrious and adaptable, but disrupts the social order for others. In the United States, Proposition 13 is the precursor to Reaganism, and the inequalities that later emerge lead to the 1992 Los Angeles riots and the rise of gated communities. Russian society struggles to adapt to a market economy, and in Bosnia and elsewhere the demise of socialism revives ethnic tensions and separatism. However, in China, economic reforms started by Deng Xiaoping lift living standards, and the internet allows high-skill work to be transferred from the West to India. The episode ends with the narrator noting how globalisation has contributed to one of the most significant achievements of the twentieth century – that more people have control over their own destinies than ever before. Interviewees include Donald Hodge and Mike Eruzione.	23 February 1997	5 July 1999

== VHS and DVD editions ==
In 1997 and 1998, VHS box sets were produced in PAL and NTSC. By 2007, most original episodes remained unavailable on DVD, however in late 2006 DVD editions were released in the US of the two world-war episodes Killing Fields and Total War exclusively in NTSC, with a few cut-down post-war episodes (on a DVD called Young Blood, drawing from the previously released Baby Boomers Boxed Set on VHS that had contained 5 complete episodes), by WGBH Boston.
