= Werner von Clemm =

German-American banker and Nazi collaborator (1897–1989)

- Werner in 1942
- Born: Werner Conrad Clemm von Hohenberg; September 27, 1897; Mainz, German Empire
- Died: April 14, 1989 (aged 91); Biddeford, Maine, United States
- Children: Michael von Clemm (son)
- Relatives: Karl von Clemm (brother)
- Status: Deceased
- Conviction: Conspiracy to import under false declarations (18 U.S.C. § 88)
- Penalty: 2 years imprisonment plus a $10,000 fine

Werner Conrad Clemm von Hohenberg (September 27, 1897 – April 14, 1989) was an American banker born into a German family that married into the German nobility, the Nazi Party and prominent American families. His father-in-law was a Vice President of Citibank. In 1922, Werner immigrated to the United States. Prior to this, he had served in the Imperial German Army during World War I. He was a representative of the German international banking firm Hardy & Co. and an employee of the Pioneer Import Corp., which imported materials from Germany and handled his cousin and Nazi diplomat, Joachim von Ribbentrop's champagne business.

Along with his twin brother, Karl von Clemm, Werner had become friends with U.S. businessman, William Rhodes Davis. In the United States, Werner became Vice President of Davis' company, Davis & Co., which shipped large quantities of oil to Germany and became a propaganda strategist and financial aide of the America First Committee, which encouraged American isolationism. Werner lived on a 200-year-old Dutch colonial home on a 130-acre estate at Syosset, New York.

In 1940, the Nazis seized large quantities of diamonds from Belgium and the Netherlands, which Werner was smuggling to the United States. The U.S. was neutral and did not declare war until December 1941. To avoid detection, Werner moved the diamonds through various European cities, shipped them to South America and they eventually found their way to New York City. Buyers in New York would make payment to a Berlin bank called Imico-Handel, which then turned the money over to the German government.

Between October 26, 1940, and early February 1941, six packages of diamonds were sent by this route, according to plan. Evidence was introduced that a New York diamond purchaser received a letter from a former Belgian supplier offering diamonds, and accompanying the letter was a note instructing the buyer to make payment for credit of Imico at the Berlin bank, and to address communications to [an alias of] one of the Imico organizers in Lisbon. The Belgian supplier testified that he was directed to write the letter by Lemberg.

By chance, the operation was stumbled upon by agents of the Treasury Department who were searching a Budweiser beer box being carried by two American soldiers of German descent. After inspecting the box, they found that it had a false bottom under which were one hundred letters and government bonds. The letters detailed Werner's diamond smuggling operation.

"The Cremer memorandum proceeds to explain the procedure to be followed. Belgian diamonds are to be shipped from Belgium to Imico in Berlin by courier. It will be the 'task of Imico to obtain the required statistical papers, export currency declarations and above all, the American consular papers which are necessary for the dispatch of the parcels.' After Imico has submitted a parcel for inspection by the 'duty officer of the Wehrmacht,' Imico will send it to 'the cloaking agent in Portugal' who will transmit it to New York. The buyer in New York will make payment to a New York bank for the account of RKG Berlin [the bank in which the Imico and Pioneer accounts were kept] in favor of Imico. The memorandum goes on to say: 'Imico reports the receipt of payment to the Commissioned Official [the German military government] who thereupon disposes of the amounts.'"

Various German documents referred to the diamonds as "Jew" diamonds. Federal investigators said that part of the assets were intended to fund Nazi propaganda in the United States. After further investigation, Werner von Clemm was arrested on 28 January 1942. He and the Pioneer Import Corp. were charged with conspiracy to import under false declarations. Three others, including Carl von Clemm, were indicted in absentia. The federal government froze Werner's shares of stock in Pioneer Import Corp. and seized $400,000 worth of gems. These assets were later liquidated for over $1,300,000.

During his trial, Werner testified that, "This German high command stuff is a lot of bunk," and he was running "a decent, legitimate, honest importing business." In the last four years, his business had brought in $2,200,000 worth of German goods, including $552,000 in diamonds. Werner claimed "I'm just a poor little importer trying to make a living." In August 1942, Werner and Pioneer Import Corp. were both found guilty. It took the jury only 90 minutes to reach their verdict.

Prior to sentencing, U.S. District Judge James Patrick Leamy berated Werner:

"These diamonds from Holland were stained with the blood of innocent people. When, some years ago, you took the oath of allegiance, some things were asked of you and some things were not asked of you. You were not asked to abandon your love for your native land, for that would be like asking a child to abandon its love for its mother. But you were asked — in fact, it was demanded of you — that you transfer your loyalty from Germany to America. From the evidence brought out in this trial, I am convinced that you have not." Your trial brought out the fact that you did not have any loyalty for your adopted land. Every dollar sent to Germany was used to commit murder, rape, and other wanton violence. You were not acting in the best interests of the United States or its people when you bought bloodstained diamonds. These were seized in acts of rape, slaughter, and plunder of innocent people. Every penny helped in further acts of slaughter."

Werner received the statutory maximum sentence of two years in prison and a $10,000 fine. An additional $10,000 fine was imposed on the Pioneer Import Corporation. Upon his release, Werner entered private banking. His son, Michael von Clemm, went on to become a leading American banker who was involved in Western banking operations in Africa and helped found Canary Wharf.

After the war, Werner sought compensation for his liquidated stocks and seized gems. The federal government refused, on the grounds that he had acted as an "enemy agent". In the 1950s, 1960s, and 1970s, Werner repeatedly attempted to obtain compensation. However, all of his appeals were denied on the grounds that the evidence against him was overwhelming. Furthermore, there was evidence that he'd continued to maintain contacts with Germany after the United States entered the war.
