= Royal Forest of Dean College =

Location
- Five Acres Campus, Berry Hill; Coleford, Gloucestershire, GL16 7JT; England; 51°48′36″N 2°36′25″W

Information
- Type: Further education college (defunct)
- Established: 1985
- Closed: 2011
- Local authority: South West England LSC (although in Gloucestershire LEA)
- Department for Education URN: 130684 Tables
- Ofsted: Reports
- Gender: mixed
- Age: 14+

Royal Forest of Dean College was a college of further education located close to the town of Coleford, in the Forest of Dean in west Gloucestershire. It was dissolved by government order as of 31 January 2011 in order to be merged to Gloucestershire College. Together with its secondary site at Mitcheldean, and around 30 further outreach sites, the college served a mainly rural area. The college offered a range of courses from A-levels and was associated with University of Gloucestershire for higher education to Master's degrees.

== History ==
East Dean Grammar School of Cinderford, formed in 1929, merged with Bells Grammar School of Coleford in 1968 to form the Royal Forest of Dean Grammar School on a new site. Bell's Grammar School had a history dating back to 1445 when a school was founded by Joan Greyndour. In 1985, the grammar school was split into a comprehensive school and the tertiary college. A 2009 Ofsted inspection rated the school with a Grade 2 (good).

On 31 January 2011, it merged into Gloucestershire College of Arts and Technology

== Alumni ==
=== Royal Forest of Dean Grammar School ===
- Janet Royall, Baroness Royall of Blaisdon, Chancellor of the Duchy of Lancaster from 2009–10 and Principal of Somerville College, Oxford

=== East Dean Grammar School ===
- Prof James Cross, Baines Professor of English Language from 1965–85 at the University of Liverpool
- Valerie Grosvenor Myer, writer
- Dame Muriel Powell (nurse) CBE
- Sir Archibald Russell CBE (attended from 1914-9 when his father was the headmaster), aircraft designer, designed the Bristol Blenheim, the Bristol Britannia and later worked on Concorde - Chief Engineer from 1944–60 at the Bristol Aeroplane Company
- Reg Ward, Chief Executive from 1976-80 of Hereford & Worcester County Council and from 1981-88 of the London Docklands Development Corporation
- Sir Jimmy Young (broadcaster) CBE, former BBC Radio 2 presenter from 1973-2002

=== Bells Grammar School ===
- Edna May Healey, Baroness Healey, writer and wife of Denis Healey
- Dennis Potter, television writer
- Dr Cyril Hart OBE (1913-2009), Verderer of the Forest of Dean, Author, Forestry Expert and Historian, born in the Forest and lived in Coleford.
