= Edna Healey =

British writer, lecturer and filmmaker

Edna May Healey, Baroness Healey (née Edmunds; 14 June 1918 – 21 July 2010) was a British writer, lecturer and filmmaker.

== Life and career ==
Edna May Edmunds was born in the Forest of Dean and educated at Bells Grammar School, Coleford, Gloucestershire, where she was the first pupil to gain a place at Oxford University. Her father, Edward Edmunds, a crane driver, threatened to send her to work in a pin factory if she did not apply herself to reading. While studying English at St Hugh's College she met Denis Healey, who was studying at Balliol College. She then trained as a teacher and married Healey in 1945, following his military service in World War II. She became Baroness Healey in 1992 when her husband received a life peerage.

Although she began her writing career relatively late in life, her books were critically acclaimed and sometimes best-sellers, including biographies of successful women in powerful positions. Lady Healey also produced two award-winning television documentaries.

In 1993, she was elected a Fellow of the Royal Society of Literature

== Quotations ==
Edna Healey has one entry in the 8th Edition of The Oxford Dictionary of Quotations where she says of Margaret Thatcher, "She has no hinterland; in particular she has no sense of history."

== Death ==
She died on 21 July 2010, aged 92. She was survived by Lord Healey, her husband of 65 years, three children and four grandchildren.

== Books ==
- Lady Unknown: The Life of Angela Burdett-Coutts (1978)
- Wives of Fame (1986) (subjects were Mary Livingstone, Jenny Marx and Emma Darwin)
- Coutts and Co., 1692-1992: Portrait of a Private Bank (1992)
- The Queen's House: A History of Buckingham Palace (1997)
- Emma Darwin: The Inspirational Wife of a Genius (2001)
- Part of the Pattern: Memoirs of a Wife at Westminster (2006)

== Documentaries ==
- Mrs Livingstone, I Presume (1982)
- One More River, the Life of Mary Slessor in Nigeria (1984)
