= Michael von Clemm =

American businessman, restaurateur and anthropologist

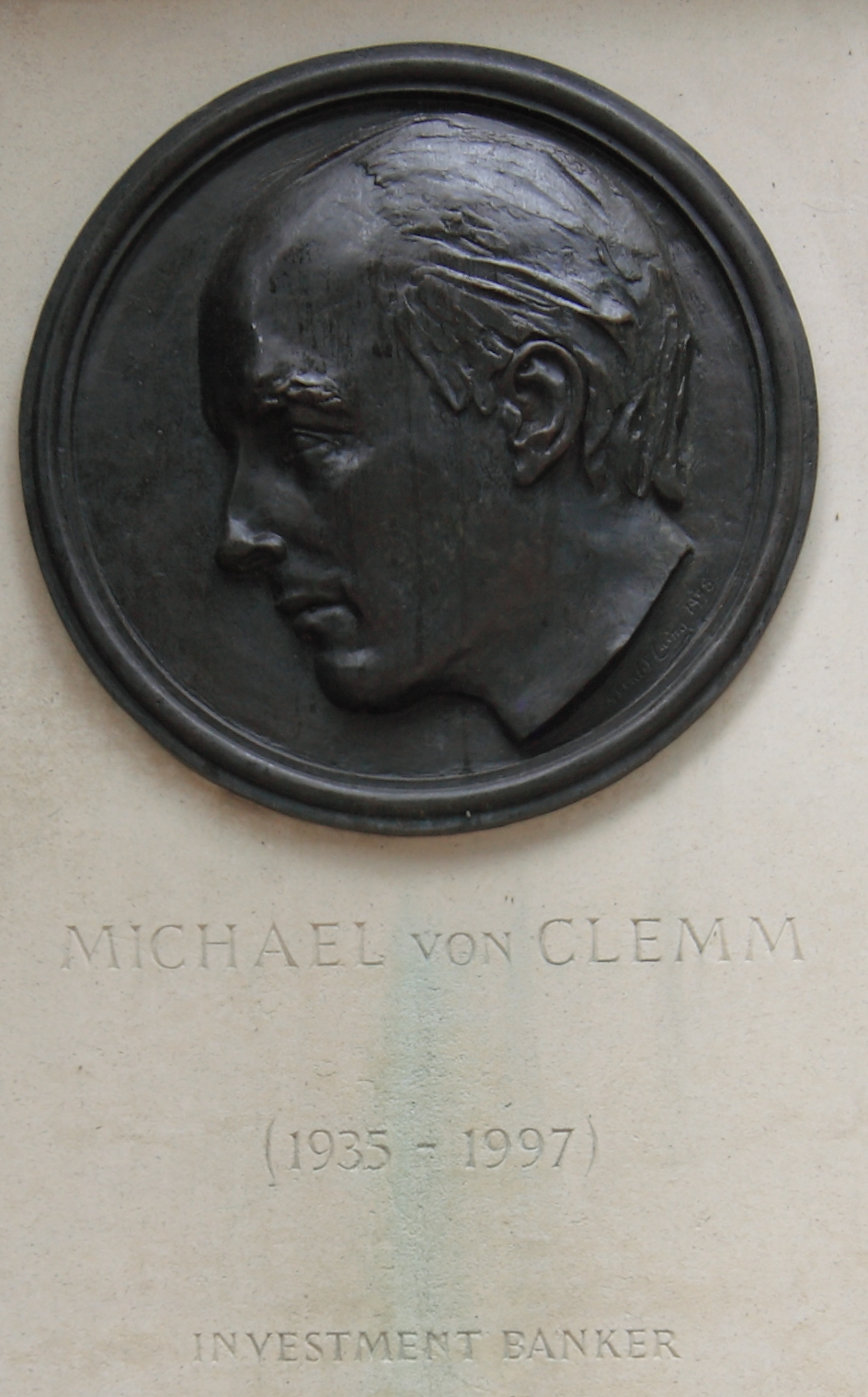
Memorial at Canary Wharf

Dr Michael von Clemm (1935–1997) was an American businessman, restaurateur, anthropologist and president of Templeton College, Oxford. Von Clemm was a leading banker in the Eurobond market, but also helped start the restaurant revolution of the 1980s in the UK, and was one of the original father of the Canary Wharf development. Von Clemm helped found the London Eurodollar market, saving London's position as a global financial centre. He also made a huge impact in his work for charity and the English Speaking Union.

== Early life and education ==
Von Clemm was born in Long Island, New York, on March 18, 1935, the son of Werner von Clemm, a prominent German-American banker who was convicted of smuggling the diamonds of Holocaust victims, and grandson of a former Citibank vice-president.

Von Clemm was educated at Phillips Exeter Academy (class of 1953) and Harvard University (anthropology), where he met his wife Louisa B. Hunnewell of Wellesley, MA. The couple left the US at the end of the 1950s to study, and Michael took a postgraduate course in anthropology at Corpus Christi College, Oxford, where he was awarded his Doctorate. As part of his studies, Von Clemm lived with the Wachagga tribe in Tanzania for 14 months. Academic life did not entirely suit him, however, and he tried his hand at journalism, with a stint on the Boston Globe as a reporter.

Von Clemm maintained an interest in anthropology throughout his career in banking. He was an assistant professor of anthropology at Harvard University from 1971 to 1972 and then when he transferred to London with CSFB, became visiting professor of anthropology at the University of Sussex, earning the title Professor. Von Clemm did not use the title in banking, but occasionally his bank colleagues – and competitors – referred to him as Professor in reference to his intellectual style.

== Banking career ==
In a career move away from academia, Von Clemm followed his father and grandfather to Citibank in 1963 where he gained a reputation for innovation – and dealmaking. He was responsible for inventing several financial instruments and services. Von Clemm was posted to London where he worked with a fellow American, Stanislas Yassukovich, at White Weld, on the development of the Eurodollar Certificate of Deposit market. Citibank launched its first Eurodollar issues in 1966. However, Von Clemm went back to Harvard Business School to lecture.

In 1971, Yassukovich hired Von Clemm to join White Weld, first as a temporary consultant on the feasibility of a Euro-commercial paper market, which did not catch on. However, in 1972 Von Clemm effectively gave up his academic career to concentrate full-time on banking. He had an aggressive style – for example on one occasion printing up T-shirts for staff which read Buy Bonds. He was also said to effectively bully clients into taking on the bank.

When Credit Suisse took a 40% stake in White Weld, Von Clemm rose rapidly to become a senior Director of the Credit Suisse White Weld joint venture. However, Merrill Lynch made a bid to acquire White Weld in 1978 and Credit Suisse needed a new partner. The existing Chairman Sir John Craven wanted Dillon Read (later Warburg Dillon Read). Von Clemm went behind his back and did a direct deal with First Boston, prompting Craven's resignation.

Von Clemm replaced Craven as chairman of the newly formed Credit Suisse First Boston, and then additionally chief executive in 1979. Although often controversial in his decisions, and taking several large risks, he turned CSFB from a relatively staid bank to a global powerhouse, propelling it into the top leagues of global banking. He stepped away from his chief executive role in 1983 but remained chairman until resigning in January 1986.

Von Clemm was known for his enormous expense claims and dramatic personal style. He was a regular – practically weekly – user of Concorde – and counted some of the world's most powerful figures as his friends. However, he also made large profits for his bank and was regarded as one of the biggest rain-makers in the City of London.

== Roux Brothers ==
In 1967, Von Clemm borrowed $900 to help two young French brothers, Michel and Albert Roux, start a restaurant business. With their first enterprise, Le Gavroche in London's Mayfair, they won first one, then two, and finally three Michelin stars, the first restaurant in the UK to do so. The Roux brothers have been credited with helping make London one of the world's best cities for eating, paving the way for other high quality restaurants which opened in their wake during the 1970s and 1980s. Von Clemm became Chairman of the Roux Restaurants Group and remained friends with the brothers.

== Canary Wharf ==
In his capacity as Chairman of Roux restaurants, Von Clemm visited the derelict Port of London during the early 1980s, in the company of London Docklands Development Corporation Chief Executive Reg Ward. He was looking for a site for a food processing plant, and the old West India Docks on the Isle of Dogs seemed to be a sensible location. Billingsgate Market had already moved there from the City of London and the site was well linked with road transport, land was relatively cheap, and there were incentives available for regeneration projects.

Von Clemm recognised the old 18th Century warehouses as similar to those in Boston, which had been converted into shops, restaurants and flats – as well as office developments. In fact, there was a direct connection – the warehouses on both sides of the Atlantic Ocean had been built at the same time to service the lucrative transatlantic trade in raw materials and manufactured goods.

Von Clemm decided that a much more interesting use for the site would be as a back office for his bank. By the time he discussed this with his board, and in particular his buccaneering Kentucky property adviser, G Ware Travelstead, the idea had further developed into putting the front office of the bank on West India Dock, effectively creating a second financial services district in London.

This idea later took shape as the Canary Wharf development, and CSFB both backed the scheme financially and in 1993 was one of the first tenants to move in.

== Post CSFB: Academic and charitable work ==
Von Clemm was made an Honorary Fellow of Corpus Christi College, Oxford and later president of Templeton College, Oxford, which merged with Green College in 2008 to become Green Templeton College, Oxford. He was a former president of The English-Speaking Union for the US, and vice-chairman of the organisation until his death. At the ESU he was credited with transforming the governance of the organisation.

He was vice-president of the City of London Archaeological Trust, and the US Foundation for the Protection of Archaeological Heritage.

Von Clemm remained involved in business as chairman of capital markets for Merrill Lynch, and as a board member of companies including Hafslund Nycomed.

== Death and memorial ==
Von Clemm died in 1997, at age 62, in Wellesley, Massachusetts, from a brain tumour. His friend Sir Richard Branson said at the time that Von Clemm's doctors believed it was due to excessive mobile phone use – Von Clemm had been an early adopter of the technology and was a constant user of his mobile. After Von Clemm's death, the Michael Von Clemm Foundation continued his interests. Among other things, the Foundation supports a Fellowship at Harvard University for final year Oxford University students, and a Fellowship at Oxford for Harvard students. There is a relief sculpture of Michael Von Clemm in Cabot Square at Canary Wharf, sculpted by Gerald Laing and unveiled by Eddie George in 1998 to commemorate his involvement in the Canary Wharf scheme.
