= Gloucestershire College =

- Gloucester, Gloucestershire; England

Information
- Type: College of further and higher education
- Motto: Learning That Works
- Established: 1980
- Chairman: Will Abbott
- Headteacher: Matthew Burgess
- Gender: Mixed
- Age: 16 to 99
- Enrolment: 14,000 full and part-time
- Website: http://www.gloscol.ac.uk

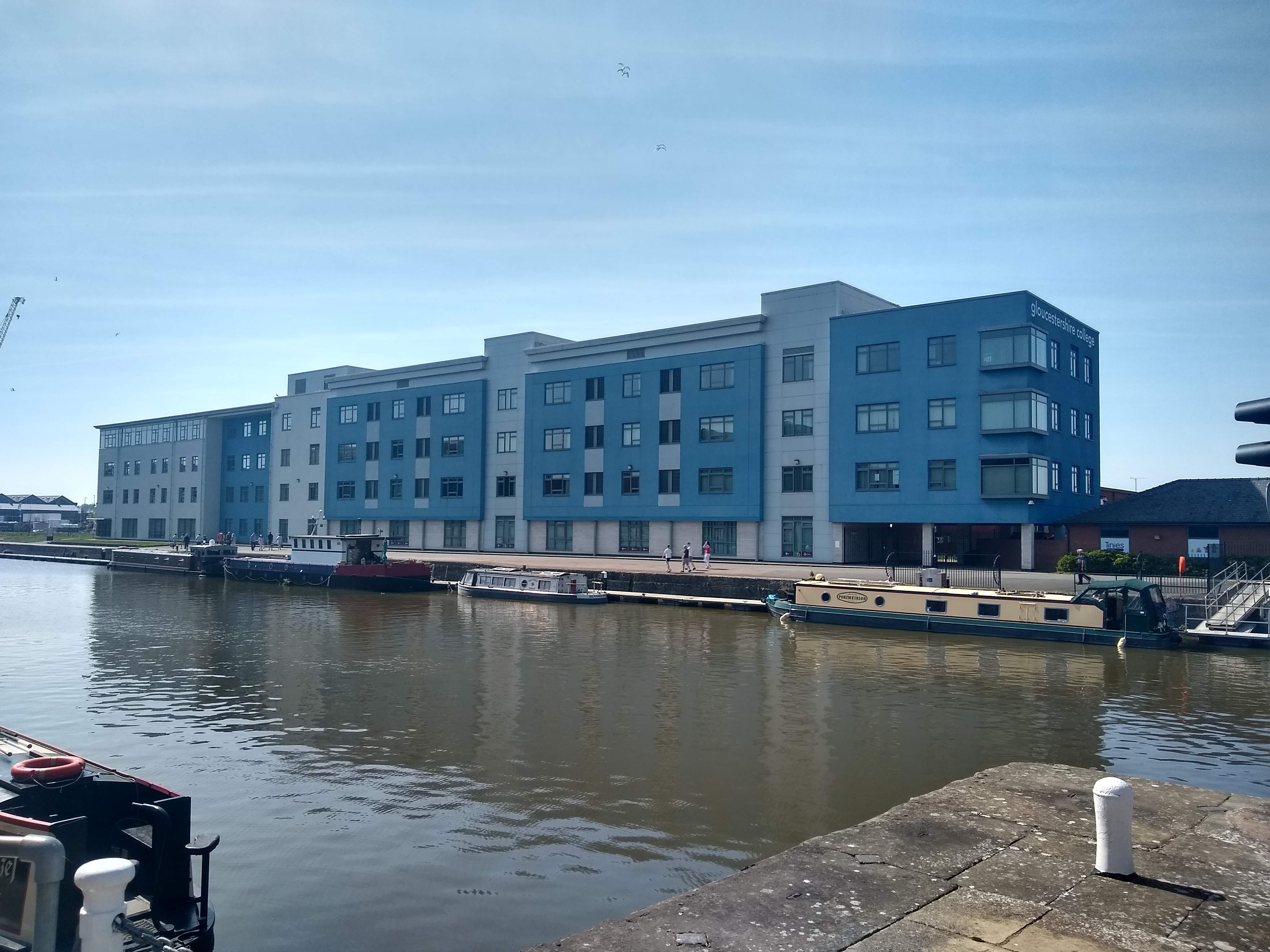
Gloucestershire College, from the canal

Gloucestershire College (GC or Gloscol) is a college of further and higher education in the county of Gloucestershire, United Kingdom.

It offers a range of education and training programmes, which include:

- Apprenticeships and higher apprenticeships
- Professional and technical qualifications
- Higher education
- Short courses for businesses
- Part-time and evening courses
- English for overseas students

== History ==
In 1969, the two branches of Gloucestershire College of Art in Cheltenham and Stroud amalgamated with the Gloucester City College of Art to form the Gloucestershire College of Art and Design (GCAD).

Gloucestershire College of Arts and Technology was formed in 1980 from the merger of four county (Local Education Authority) colleges, Gloucestershire College of Education, Gloucestershire College of Art and Design, Gloucester City College of Technology, and North Gloucestershire College of Technology. In 1990 GlosCAT divided its provision forming a separate Higher Education Trust to go forward with a separate merger to become Cheltenham & Gloucester College of Higher Education and then the University of Gloucestershire. It maintained the remaining part as a Local Authority institution, which became a Further Education Corporation.

In early 2011 Gloucestershire College merged with the former Royal Forest of Dean College and thus acquired the sites of the college to safeguard the provision of further education in the region.

A 10-year Memorandum of Understanding has been signed by the University of Gloucestershire's Vice-Chancellor and the Principals of Gloucestershire College and South Gloucestershire and Stroud College to support access to higher education locally in Gloucestershire.

In April 2026, Gloucestershire College was awarded Technical Excellence College (TEC) status by the UK Government as part of the Technical Excellence Colleges programme. The college was one of five further education colleges selected to deliver specialist training in digital technologies, supporting skills development for high-demand industries.

== Campuses ==
Gloucestershire College has four main campuses at large purpose-built facilities in Cheltenham, Gloucester and the Forest of Dean. Its Employer Training & Apprenticeships team is based at the Gloucester Campus.

The Forest of Dean campus relocated from Five Acres to Cinderford in 2018. The modern, lakeside facility was built as part of the £100m Cinderford Northern Quarter regeneration project.

The Hardwick Campus in Cheltenham will become the College's fourth campus and is scheduled to open in autumn 2026. The campus will expand the college's provision for construction, first steps and green skills training, supporting the future skills needs of employers.

=== Cheltenham campus ===
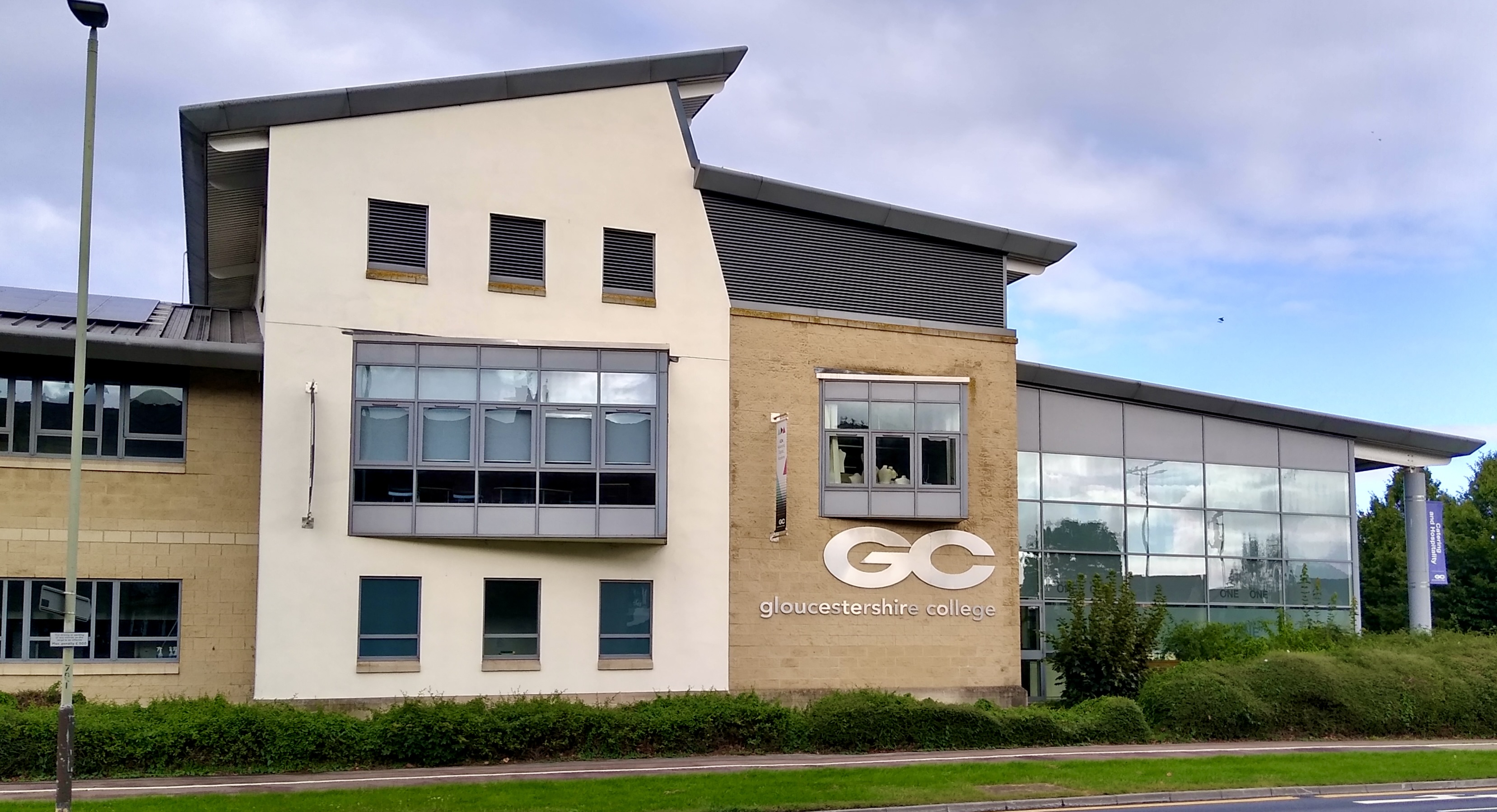
Gloucestershire College, Cheltenham campus

Cheltenham campus, situated on Princess Elizabeth Way (formerly in The Park), is home to Cheltenham Fashion Academy; ADA: Advanced Digital Academy, a specialist digital, cyber security and engineering training facility; the commercial Number One Restaurant and Graduations at Cheltenham Spa salon; a coffee shop; nursery; a new library; purpose-built construction centre.

Courses available in Cheltenham include accounting; apprenticeships; art and design; business; catering and hospitality; counselling; construction; ESOL, EFL and CELTA; fashion; hairdressing and beauty; health and social care, early years; languages; and teacher training.

In 2024, the college opened the Cheltenham Construction Centre, a specialist construction training facility located adjacent to the Cheltenham campus. The centre provides dedicated teaching spaces and workshops for construction and building services courses.

=== Gloucester Campus ===
Gloucester Campus relocated to a brownfield site within Gloucester Docks in 2007 and the new building, situated on Llanthony Road, won the Civic Trust Award for Best Climate Friendly Scheme in July 2008.

The campus is home to a purpose-built Construction workshops; The Taylor Theatre; a commercial salon and spa; a coffee shop; nursery; dance, TV, photography and recording studios; an Enterprise Lab; purpose-built aircraft simulation room; sports hall; library; and workshops for engineering, construction and motor vehicle.

Courses available in Gloucester include apprenticeships; arts, media, music and performing arts; business, administration, management and finance; construction and building services; counselling; engineering; ESOL; hairdressing, beauty and holistic therapies; health, care and early years; IT and computing; motor vehicle; sport and public services; teacher training and education; and travel and tourism.

=== Forest of Dean Campus ===
The former campus based in Coleford closed in August 2018.

Since September 2018, a new £13 million campus is based in Cinderford, which offers a background of the forest. There is: a lake at the back of the campus, a balcony giving out views, the view restaurant, construction room and a graduations beauty salon.

Courses available include Arts; Catering and Hospitality; Construction and Building Services; Independent Living; Hairdressing; Beauty and Holistic Therapies; Health, Care and Early Years; IT and Computing; and Teacher Training and Education.

Since September 2019, GC and Dene Magna are in partnership, which helps students from the whole of the Forest of Dean to have A-levels reintroduced at the Cinderford campus.

== Students ==
The college caters mainly for the 16–18 age group. It also offers higher education up to and including HND, HNC and foundation degree levels, NVQ Level 4 and higher apprenticeships.

There are approximately 4,000 full-time and 10,000 part-time students enrolled at Gloucestershire College.

== Partnerships ==
Gloucestershire College has formed strategic partnerships with the University of Gloucestershire, the University of the West of England and Birmingham City University to offer a range of foundation degrees, including Early Years Studies; Health and Complementary Therapies; Public Services; Salon Management; Therapeutic Counselling; Electronic and Computer Engineering; and Health and Social Care.
