= Reg Ward =

British civil servant and LDDC chief executive

- Born: Albert Joseph Ward; October 5, 1927; Forest of Dean, Gloucestershire, England
- Died: January 6, 2011 (aged 83)
- Education: East Dean Grammar School
- Alma mater: Manchester University
- Occupations: Civil servant, urban regeneration executive
- Known for: First Chief Executive of the London Docklands Development Corporation
- Spouse: Betty Ward (m. 1954; died 2010)
- Children: 2

Albert Joseph Ward (5 October 1927 – 6 January 2011), known as Reg Ward, was the first Chief executive of the London Docklands Development Corporation (LDDC), serving in that capacity from 1981 to 1988.

== Early life and education ==
The son of a miner, Reg Ward was born on 5 October 1927 in the Forest of Dean and educated at East Dean Grammar School, Cinderford, Gloucestershire.

While lecturing on radar equipment as a young RAF pilot, he was encouraged to apply for University – the first in his family to do so.

He went to Manchester University to study Medieval History and then Fine Art and Architecture. However he rejected the possibility of becoming an academic, preferring instead to join the Inland Revenue as a Tax Inspector.

== Local government ==
A series of local government appointments followed, culminating in him becoming Chief executive of the London Borough of Hammersmith and Fulham, and later of Hereford and Worcester County Council.

== LDDC ==
Ward was a surprise choice by Secretary of State Michael Heseltine to lead the new Docklands body on its inception in 1980 and for 9 months was the only member of staff during its "shadow period" of operation. However this long period gave him the opportunity to walk extensively through Docklands, drawing pictures of the old warehouses and imagining what possible redevelopments could take place. A story told by ex LDDC staffers was that his first work for the organisation took place using a bucket for a seat and an old upturned tea chest as a desk.

Docklands had been the subject of many redevelopment frameworks and plans over the years, none of which had come to fruition. Ward's genius was to be open to new ideas, and to seize opportunities which came along, rather than to create reports and paperwork. Ward said if he had created some grand plan..."we would still be debating and nothing would have got built. Instead, we have gone for an organic, market-driven approach, responding pragmatically to each situation."

It was Ward who invited Michael von Clemm of Credit Suisse First Boston to Docklands, originally to look for a site for a food factory. When von Clemm suggested that the Canary Wharf site might be suitable for offices to house bank trading floors, Ward leapt upon the idea and helped sell it to Government. (For full story see Canary Wharf entry).

At the LDDC Ward was responsible for progressing the ideas of Docklands Light Railway, London City Airport, Canary Wharf and he helped Iain Shearer on the ExCeL Exhibition Centre.

According to the Daily Telegraph: "Ward’s greatest achievement was to persuade hard-nosed City and property investors that Docklands revival was going to work. By 1986, the LDDC had spent around £300m of public money, but had succeeded in attracting £1.4 billion in private investment."

His forthright style did not sit well with his colleagues in central government, in particular the Secretary of State for the Environment Nicholas Ridley, appointed to replace Heseltine in 1986. Ward's disregard for Civil Service protocol and rules caused one colleague to remark: "the corns he has stepped on would fill more shoes than even Imelda Marcos possessed". He is said to have once avoided answering phone calls from the Secretary of State for several days because he knew the call was to say that one of his road projects would be cancelled.

Ward was eased out of his job shortly after the deal on Canary Wharf was signed. However, he is now viewed as the main driver in Government behind the extraordinary change and development in London Docklands. If there is one single person that was responsible for London's Dockland being transformed into London Docklands, that person is Reg Ward.

== Career after LDDC ==
Ward went on to work in Barcelona and Sydney on major regeneration projects before being appointed to head the regeneration of St Kitts in the Caribbean.

In his later years, he ran his own consultancy company and was a regular contributor to debates on urban regeneration and the future of the Thames Gateway.

== Private life ==
Ward married Betty in 1954. They had met in nursery school and she predeceased him in early 2010. They had two children.
