= Karl von Clemm =

Karl Franz Clemm von Hohenberg (27 September 1897, Mainz – 4 March 1994, Munich), also Karl F. von Clemm, was the son of Gustav Clemm von Hohenberg and Maria Clemm von Hohenberg, née Michel. He was first married to Audrey Zimmermann, and second to Veronika von Globig-Weissenbach.

Karl Franz Clemm von Hohenberg was known for his significant role in the international banking sector. He was a representative of the German international banking firm Hardy & Company. Through a German banker William Rhodes Davis, a U.S. oil man had arranged to meet him. The two would become good friends and ship large quantities of oil from America and Mexico and then to Germany. He was a liaison between Eurotank, Davis' main operation in Germany and the Nazi government. It was his job to arrange barter with the Economic Ministry on Davis' oil imports. Davis appointed von Clemm to the board of directors of Crusader Petroleum Industries and as head of Eurohandel, both of which were involved in Nazi oil imports used to build up the German war machine. Karl's brother, Werner, was also involved with Davis and Karl played a part in his brother's diamond smuggling operation, for which he was indicted in absentia in 1942.
