= Edward Smout =

Australian soldier

Sergeant Edward David "Ted" Smout OAM (5 January 1898 – 22 June 2004) was an Australian soldier in the First World War. He was Australia's 6th last surviving World War I veteran.

Smout served in the army as a stretcher bearer. He was one of the first on the scene upon the landing of Manfred von Richthofen, the Red Baron, after he had been shot down and was witness to his final words. He was also the last surviving witness of Richthofen's death.

== Biography ==
Smout was born in Brisbane, Queensland in 1898. He joined the Australian Army Medical Corps in September 1915 at the age of 17, giving his age as 18 years 8 months. Upon arrival in France, he was posted to the 3rd Sanitary Section of the Australian Army Medical Corps where he served as a stretcher bearer.

During an engagement near the Somme River on 21 April 1918, Smout was an eyewitness to the final moments in the life and career of the German flying ace Manfred von Richthofen (aka the "Red Baron"), whose aeroplane had landed nearby after he was fatally shot. Smout reported that Richthofen's last word was "kaputt" ("finished"). Smout said later in life that he resisted the temptation to souvenir the Red Baron's boots and Iron Cross. He was discharged on 8 September 1919. In 1922, Ted joined an insurance firm, beginning a successful career that would last till his retirement in 1958.

He was awarded France's highest honour, being made a Chevalier (Knight) of the Legion d'Honneur in 1998 and received the Medal of the Order of Australia for service to the community. He was a regular participant in Anzac Day marches. Smout was one of Australia's last surviving WWI veterans. He died at 106 years old, predeceased by his wife of 69 years, Ella Annie Grace Stevens (1 November 1900 – 7 March 1992). He is survived by his three children, 12 grandchildren and 23 great-grandchildren.

His son, Dr. Westall David "Westy" Smout (11 June 1924 – 27 March 2020), was himself a Second World War "Bomber Navigator" veteran. On 14 July 1950, Westy married Dr. Ruth A. Yolanda Cilento (30 July 1925 – 18 April 2016), the second daughter of doctors Sir Raphael Cilento and Phyllis McGlew.

According to historical journalist Jonathan King, "Ted Smout's legacy is in the hundreds of newspaper articles written about him, the book he wrote Three Centuries Spanned, hours and hours of video footage instructing Australians not to get involved in conflicts like Iraq or Afghanistan. His main message always was we should not glorify war. It was a mistake to fight in a far flung battle that had nothing to do with Australia, and he pleaded with the nation never to do it again."

He appeared in the series People's Century where he discussed his recollections of the First World War in the episode "Killing Fields". Because of his eyewitness account of Richthofen's death, he also made appearances in other media. Some of his last known footage was talking in 2002 for the Discovery Channel detective-documentary film about the Red Baron's death.

He was a supporter of Australian becoming a republic and was a member of the Australian Republic Movement.

== Death ==
He died in 2004, aged 106. At the time, he was the oldest surviving veteran of WWI.

== Honours and awards ==
- Medal of the Order of Australia (awarded 6 June 1978)
- British War Medal
- Victory Medal
- 80th Anniversary Armistice Remembrance Medal (awarded 21 April 1999)
- Centenary Medal (awarded 1 January 2002)
- Chevalier (Knight) of the Légion d'honneur (awarded 4 July 1998)
- Ted Smout Memorial Bridge named in his honour (14 July 2009)
