= Emanuel Fried =

American dramatist

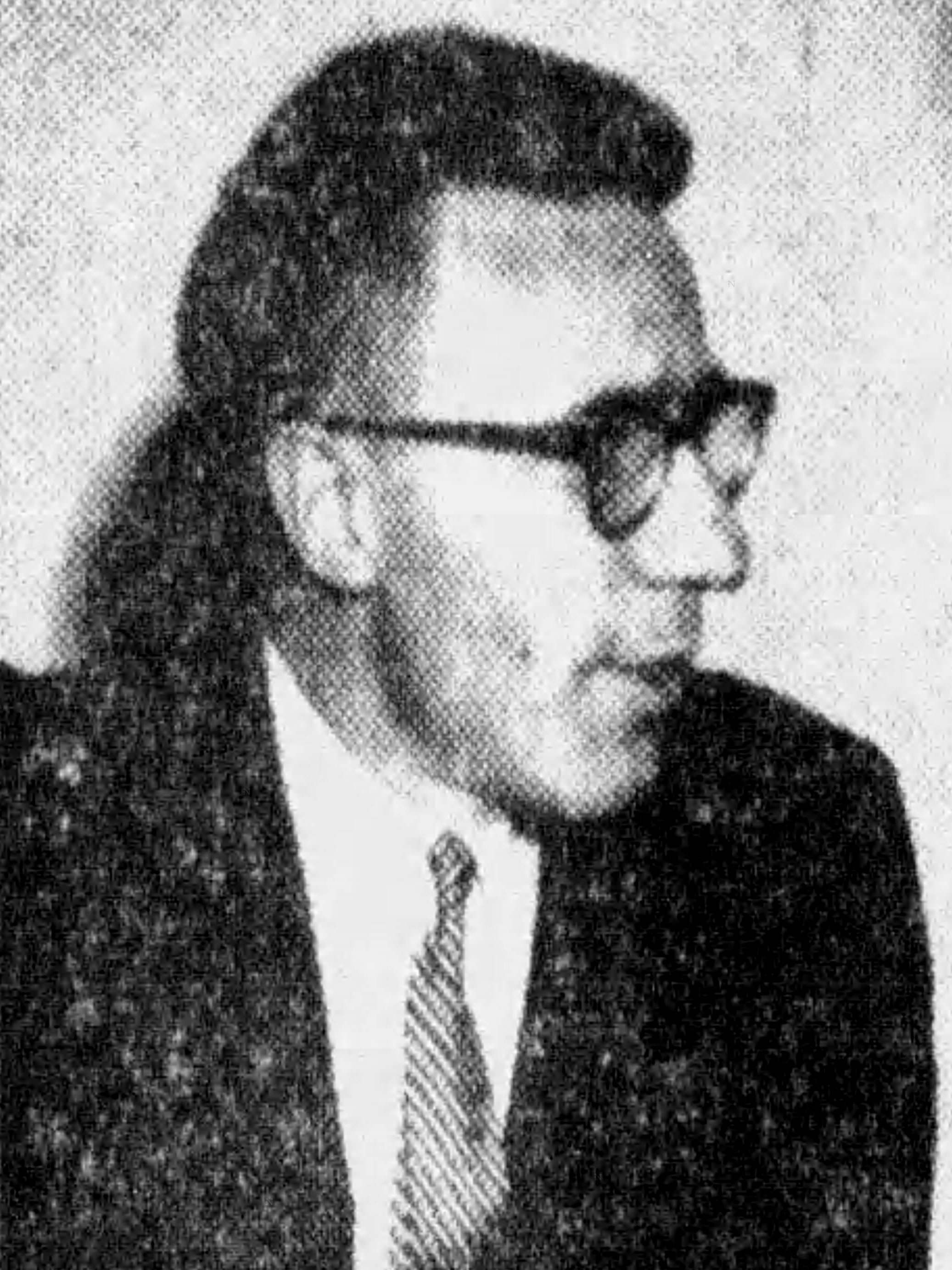
Fried in 1954

Emanuel "Manny" Fried (March 1, 1913 – February 25, 2011) was a playwright, actor, and union organizer. Born in New York City to a working-class background, Fried married into a prominent upper-class Buffalo, NY family. At the onset of World War II, Fried worked for the aircraft manufacturer Curtiss-Wright. There, Fried became involved in the company's union and was fired for subversive activities. From 1944 to 1946, Fried served in the US Army. After the war, Fried again worked as a labor organizer, and was fired after an FBI investigation into Communist ties.

In 1954, Fried was called before the House Un-American Activities Committee to investigate ties to the Communist Party. After invoking the First Amendment to the United States Constitution, and not the Fifth, and refusing to answer questions, Fried was blacklisted and unable to find work or have his plays produced. He ended up selling life insurance for around 15 years for Canada Life, the only place he could find work, selling mainly to former union members and colleagues. Throughout this period, he was writing plays and performing as an actor on the Buffalo stage. He eventually decided to complete his bachelor's degree, having only finished one year of college at University of Iowa on a football scholarship as a younger man. He not only completed his B.A., but went on to complete his Ph.D. at Buffalo State College, where he was hired to teach in 1973. He retired from this position in 1983, but continued to teach as an adjunct professor until 2008. Fried also taught for the Cornell University School of Industrial and Labor Relations. He was interviewed for the episode 12 from the PBS series "People's Century" and talked about the "Second Red Scare".

== Fried's plays (selection) ==
- The Dodo Bird
- Brothers for A’ That
- Drop Hammer
- Elegy for Stanley Gorski
- The Second Beginning
- Marked for Success
- Boilermakers and Martinis
