= William Rhodes Davis =

American businessman (1889–1941)

William Rhodes Davis (February 10, 1889 – August 1, 1941) was a United States businessman whose oil interests involved him in furthering the strategic interests of Nazi Germany.

== Early years ==
Davis was born in Montgomery, Alabama, on February 10, 1889, into a family of limited means. He was the son of John Wesley Davis and Alice Rhodes Davis. His father was a policeman. He claimed to be a relative of Cecil Rhodes on his mother's side and of Jefferson Davis on his father's side, assertions which remain unproven. He held menial positions on railroad trains and eventually became a locomotive engineer.

His career in the oil industry began in 1913 when he organized a small company in Muskogee, Oklahoma, and became a "wildcatter". He volunteered for the U.S. Army during World War I and was discharged as a second lieutenant in 1920. He saw action in France and later claimed to have been wounded, albeit the only injuries he received occurred when he jumped from a moving train. He worked as an oil broker in Tulsa, Oklahoma, and late in the 1920s was party to a complicated conflict between several independent oilmen and Standard Oil that revolved around settling thousands of colonists on land in Peru.

== German involvement ==
In 1933 he built an oil refinery in Hamburg, Germany, and developed business interests for a short time in England and somewhat longer in Germany. He served as the principal negotiator of the arrangement that allowed Germany and Italy to build up their oil reserves in the years before World War II using expropriated Mexican oil, until the British blockade put an end to the enterprise. "He is said", according to the New York Times, to have won the arrangement thanks to an introduction to Vicente Lombardo Toledano, a "powerful Mexican labor leader", provided by his longtime friend John L. Lewis, head of the CIO.

Throughout his career, he faced numerous legal challenges, including a notable case in which a British court convicted him of defrauding a Danish oil company. In this case, the presiding judge called him "an unscrupulous and ruthless financier" and said "I do not accept him as a witness of truth."

In 1940, Davis arranged for multiple contributions, evading the restrictions of the Hatch Act, to finance the October 23 radio address in which John L. Lewis attacked President Franklin D. Roosevelt and backed Republican presidential candidate Wendell Willkie, all without Willkie's knowledge. The following spring, Willkie heard Davis had disparaged him and inquired as to the truth of what he had heard. To Davis' reply he wrote: "I have your very impertinent letter. I had written as one gentleman to another concerning a statement that had been attributed to you. Your replies are merely cheap inferences."

During the 1940 U.S. elections, Davis used funds provided by the German government to contribute approximately $160,000 (equivalent to $3,676,960 in 2025) to a Pennsylvania Democratic organization to attempt to defeat Sen. Joseph Guffey, a Democrat and a prominent critic of Nazi Germany, and to attempt to bribe the Pennsylvania delegation to the 1940 Democratic National Convention to vote against Roosevelt, moves which both failed. The German government allocated $5 million (equivalent to $115 million in 2025), stored at the German embassy, to support Davis's efforts.

== Controversy ==
In December 1940, Verne Marshall, head of the No Foreign War Committee, claimed that Davis, upon returning from a trip to Germany in 1939, presented the State Department with a peace plan representing Göring's views and called for President Roosevelt to serve as mediator between the warring nations. Marshall criticized FDR for failing to take advantage of the opportunity, but most viewed the plan as an attempt to impose a "German peace". The German government denied any knowledge of such a plan.

On December 31, 1940, in reaction to Davis's role in forming and financing the No Foreign Wars Committee, U.S. Senator Josh Lee (D-OK) said Davis' support of committee represented "the diabolically cunning betrayal of the American people." He continued:

The record of this man Davis shows conclusively the great financial stake he has in a complete Nazi victory in the European war. Much of the gasoline sending showers of fiery death into the defenseless heart of London was sold to the German government by this man Davis.... He is still trying to promote a phony peace through the White House to pull Nazi Germany's chestnuts out of the fire.... The No Foreign Wars Committee is a timely object lesson in the technique of all Nazi infiltration.

Davis asserted his loyalty to the United States and said he hoped a negotiated peace could end the war. He distanced himself from Marshall and the No Foreign War Committee while expressing sympathy for its aims. He asked Sen. Burton Wheeler, a prominent isolationist, to call him before a Senate committee so he could defend himself against "an organized nation-wide campaign ... by financial and competitive interests".

On January 7, he was subpoenaed to testify before a Washington, DC, grand jury investigating campaign expenditures for violations of the Hatch and the Corrupt Practices Acts during the 1940 presidential campaign. The same day, Wheeler scheduled Davis to testify before the Senate Interstate Commerce Subcommittee about the "peace place" described by Marshall. Davis testified before the grand jury on January 9.

In mid-1941, Josephus Daniels, who as U.S. Ambassador to Mexico had firsthand knowledge of his Davis' business and political dealings, was quoted describing how Davis was viewed when he first began trading Mexican oil:

Some people regarded Davis as a profiteer; others as a man who would furnish needed markets for Mexican oil; and others as a ... Nazi agent or as a crook. In reality, he was a composite of each of these descriptions.

== Death ==
Davis died of a heart attack in Houston, Texas, on August 1, 1941. At the time, Davis was the head or principal of approximately 20 companies headquartered in New York City, with holdings and operations in several states of the United States and several other countries, including Mexico and Sweden.

=== Speculation about British involvement ===
A document in the papers of British Security Coordination, the British intelligence center headquartered in New York City, records that Davis was involved in a scheme to provide fuel in support of Nazi Germany's attacks on Atlantic shipping besides other activities in support of the German war effort and states that "The swiftest way to put a stop to this scheme was to remove Davis from the scene." However, Davis' biographer assessed the motives and opportunities of all who would have benefited from Davis' death and concludes that he likely died of natural causes regardless.

== Later reputation ==
A few years after his death, Davis was named in Assistant U.S. Attorney General O. John Rogge's Nazi Report. It identified him as Abwehr agent C-80, not a spy but an "agent of influence" whose activities were financed with the personal approval of Hitler, and who in that role supplied petroleum to Nazi Germany and helped Germany try to influence U.S. politics.

The United States government released captured Nazi government documents in 1957 showing how Davis funneled Nazi funds into the 1940 U.S. elections.

== Personal life ==
In 1909, Davis had a son, William Rhodes, Jr., by May Tankin. Their marriage has not been documented. William Rhodes, Jr., died in an airplane crash in Nicaragua in 1933 while exploring for oil. Davis married Pearl Peters in 1921 and they had two sons, Joseph Graham Davis and Currie Boyd Davis. Davis later divorced Peters and married Marie M. Tomkunas.

At his death in 1941, Peters had remarried and was living in Houston, along with their younger son Currie. Their older son Joseph was living in Bronxville, N.Y., engaged to wed Doris Jane Meyer in November. Davis and his wife were living nearby in Scarsdale, New York. Davis left $100,000 to Pearl Peters. He put the remainder of his estate into a trust, with half of the income going to his wife Marie M. Tomkunas and the other half to be divided by his two surviving sons. Each son was to receive one-fourth of the estate at age 30, and each another fourth on the death of their step-mother. Davis' estate was valued between $5 and $10 million. His longtime personal secretary Erna Frieda Wehrle became chairman of Davis' oil company, Davis & Co, Inc.

Joseph Graham Davis married Doris Meyer on November 29, 1941. Their eldest child, Joseph Graham "Gray" Davis, Jr., was Governor of California from 1999 to 2003.

== Sources ==
- Dale Harrington, Mystery Man: William Rhodes Davis, Nazi Agent of Influence (Brassey's, 2001)
