= Thomas Robbins =

Thomas Robbins, Tom Robbins or Thomas Robins may refer to:

== Arts ==
- Thomas Robins the Elder (1715/16–1770), English artist
- Thomas Robins the Younger (1748–1806), English artist
- Thomas Sewell Robins (1810–1880), British painter of maritime themes

== Other people ==
- Thomas Robbins (minister) (1777–1856), American Congregational minister, bibliophile and antiquarian
- Thomas Robins (inventor) (1868–1957), inventor of the conveyor belt
- Thomas M. Robins (1881–1965), US Army Major General
- Ellis Robins, 1st Baron Robins (Thomas Ellis Robins, 1884–1962), American-born British businessman and public servant
- Thomas H. Robbins Jr. (1900–1972), American admiral
- Tom Robbins (1932–2025), American author
- Thomas Robbins (sociologist) (1943–2015), independent American scholar of sociology of religion
- Tom Alan Robbins (born 1954), American actor
- Thomas Robins (actor) (active since 1995), New Zealand actor
- Tom Robbins (journalist), journalist with The Village Voice

== See also ==
- Thomas Robinson (disambiguation)
- Thomas Robson (disambiguation)
- Tommy Robinson (disambiguation)
- Tommy Robison (born 1961), American football player
- Tommy Robson (1944–2020), English footballer
