= List of freemen of the City of Gloucester =

Arms of the City of Gloucester

This is a list of the freemen of the City of Gloucester in England.

== 17th-century ==
- 1653 - Robert Payne, member of Parliament.
- 1658 - Ralph Wallis, nonconformist pamphleteer, known as "the Cobler of Gloucester".

== 18th-century ==
- 1762 - Benjamin Hyett.
- 1782 - John Phillpotts, land agent.
- 1789 - George Worrall Counsel, lawyer and antiquarian.

== 19th-century ==
- 1835 - George Viner Ellis, anatomist.
