= Thomas Robinson =

Thomas, Tom or Tommy Robinson may refer to:

== Artists ==
- Thomas Robinson (composer) (c. 1560 – after 1609), English composer and music teacher
- Thomas Heath Robinson (1869–1954), British book illustrator

== Politicians ==
- Thomas Robinson, 1st Baron Grantham (c. 1695–1770), English diplomat and politician
- Thomas Robinson, 2nd Baron Grantham (1738–1786), English politician and statesman
- Thomas Robinson Jr. (1800–1843), United States representative from Delaware
- Thomas Robinson (Gloucester MP) (1827–1897), English corn merchant and Liberal politician, MP for Gloucester 1880–95
- Thomas H. Robinson (1859–1930), American politician and lawyer in Maryland
- Thomas A. Robinson (politician) (born 1862), American politician from Maryland
- Sir Thomas Robinson (Stretford MP) (1864–1953), English politician, MP for Stretford, 1918–1931
- Thomas J. B. Robinson (1868–1958), United States representative from Iowa
- Tommy F. Robinson (1942–2024), American politician from Arkansas
- Thomas Robinson (Northern Ireland politician) (born 1950 or 1951), Unionist politician from Northern Ireland

== Sportsmen ==
- Thomas Robinson (cricketer) (1837–1910), English cricketer
- Thomas Robinson (footballer) (1893–1951), English footballer
- Thomas Robinson (footballer, born 1903) (1903-1981), English footballer, see List of Bury F.C. players (1–24 appearances)
- Tommy Robinson (footballer) (1909–1982), English footballer of the 1930s
- Tommy Robinson (sprinter) (1937–2012), Bahamian sprinter
- Thomas Robinson (basketball) (born 1991), basketball player
- Tom Robinson (rugby union) (born 1994), New Zealand rugby union player
- Tom Robinson (swim coach), American swimming and diving coach

== Other people ==
- Sir Thomas Robinson, 1st Baronet (1703–1777), English architect and collector; Governor of Barbados, 1742–1747
- Thomas Robinson (1749–1813), English cleric in Leicester
- Thomas Robinson (orientalist) (1790–1873), English cleric and academic
- Thomas Romney Robinson (1792–1882), Irish astronomer and physicist
- Thomas Robinson (Medal of Honor, 1864), Irish-born soldier in the Union Army
- Thomas Robinson (Medal of Honor, 1866) (1837–1915), United States Navy sailor
- Sir Thomas B. Robinson (1853–1939), Australian businessman and diplomat
- Tom Robinson (born 1950), English singer-songwriter and broadcaster
- Tom Robinson (priest) (1934–2007), Church of England military archdeacon
- Tommy Robinson (born 1982), pseudonym used by Stephen Yaxley-Lennon, former leader of the English Defence League
- Tommy Robinson (hooligan), British football hooligan
- Tommy Robinson, British actor who played Albert Briggs in the 1980s children's programme Jonny Briggs
- Thomas Henry Robinson Jr. of Robinson v. United States, a Supreme Court case involving the Federal Kidnapping Act

== Fictional characters ==
- Tom Robinson (Oz), character on the HBO series Oz
- Tom Robinson, a character in the novel To Kill a Mockingbird

== See also ==
- Thomas Robbins (disambiguation)
- Thomas Robson (disambiguation)
- Tommy Robinson (disambiguation)
- Tommy Robison (born 1961), American football player
- Tommy Robson (1944-2020), English footballer
