= Tommy Robinson (disambiguation) =

Tommy Robinson (born 1982) is a British far-right activist.

Tommy Robinson may also refer to:

- Tommy Robinson (footballer) (1909–1982), English footballer of the 1930s
- Tommy F. Robinson (1942–2024), American politician from Arkansas
- Tommy Robinson (hooligan), British football hooligan
- Tommy Robinson, British actor in Jonny Briggs

== See also ==
- Thomas Robinson (disambiguation)
- Tommy Robison (born 1961), American football player
- Thomas Robson (disambiguation)
- Thomas Robbins (disambiguation)
