= Thomas Robson =

Thomas Robson may refer to:

- Thomas Robson (actor) (1737–1813), English actor
- Thomas Robson (priest) (died 1934), South African priest
- Tom Robson (baseball) (1946–2021), American baseball player
- Tommy Robson (Durham City footballer), born in Gosforth, played for Durham City; see 1927–28 Rochdale A.F.C. season
- Tommy Robson (footballer, born 1892), (1892–?), English footballer, born in Scotswood played for Stockport County; see Harry Hardy
- Tom Robson (footballer, born 1936) (1936–1981), English footballer
- Tommy Robson (1944–2020), English footballer
- Tom Robson (footballer, born 1907), English footballer
- Thomas Robson (footballer, born 1995), English footballer
- Thomas Binns Robson (1843–1925), Quaker orchardist in South Australia
- Tom Robson (Doctors), a fictional character from Doctors
- Thomas Robson (politician) (1851–1940), Canadian politician

== See also ==
- Thomas Robson-Kanu, English-Welsh footballer
- Thomas Robinson (disambiguation)
- Tommy Robinson (disambiguation)
- Thomas Robbins (disambiguation)
- Tommy Robison (born 1961), American football player
