= Charles Hyett =

English politician

Charles Hyett (1677 – 1738), of Painswick House, near Gloucester, Gloucestershire, was an English politician.

He was born 10 April 1677, the eldest son of Benjamin Hyett (d. 1711), an attorney and clerk of the peace for Gloucestershire. His father held a lease on Marybone House in the south-west corner of Gloucester from the city council, close to the castle, which Charles in due course inherited and extended.

Hyett married Anna (d. 1728), daughter of Nicholas Webb, an alderman of Gloucester in 1707. They had two sons Benjamin and Nicholas.

In 1705 he was appointed as chapter clerk and as bailiff and rent collector for Gloucester. In 1715 he was appointed constable of Gloucester cathedral, thereby acquiring a lease of the Crown land adjoining his house to extend his garden

He was returned unopposed as a Tory Member (MP) for Gloucester in 1722.

He purchased an estate in Painswick in 1733, where he built a gentleman's residence. He may also have been responsible for the Pigeon House in the Painswick Rococo Garden, developed by his son Benjamin, which appears to date from this period. He also purchased Hunt's Court in the hamlet of Bentham, Badgeworth, Gloucestershire.

He was buried in the family vault in Gloucester Cathedral.
