= Nicholas Hyett =

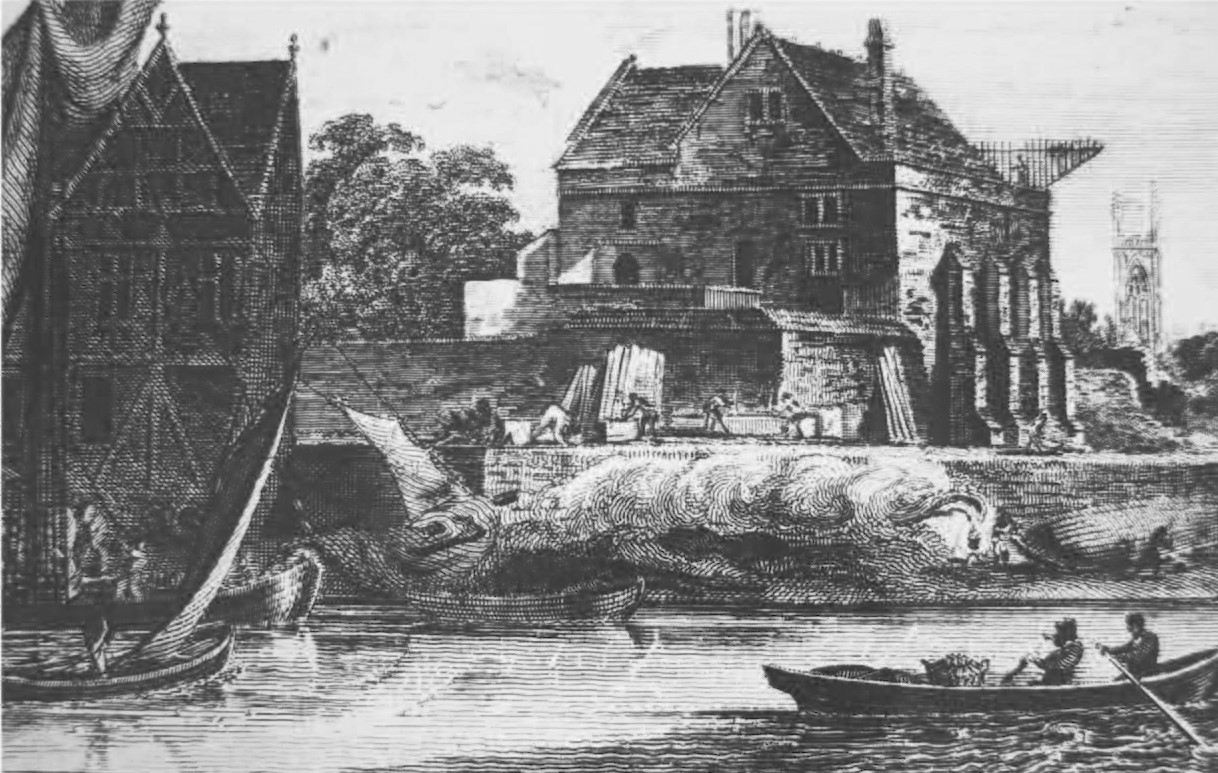
Gloucester Castle keep in use as part of the county gaol in the 18th century. (A later work said to be based on an 1819 original)

Nicholas Hyett (1709-1777) was a lawyer and justice of the peace in Gloucester, England, and one of the last keepers and constables of the Castle of Gloucester.

== Life ==
Nicholas Hyett was born in 1709 to Charles Hyett (d. 1738) and younger brother of Benjamin Hyett (1708–62), who was responsible for the Rococo garden at Painswick House.

He followed his elder brother to Pembroke College, Oxford and the Inner Temple, where they became barristers in the same year. Hyett became a lawyer and justice of the peace, serving as recorder for Tewkesbury for 17 years from 1760. When his elder brother died childless in 1762, he inherited the family estate. In 1765 he was granted by letters patent the office of keeper and constable of the Castle of Gloucester by King George III. By that time the office was largely honorary as the castle had long since been reduced just to a keep which was used as a gaol. His father Charles had been granted the same office in 1715.

Nicholas Hyett stood as a Tory for the parliamentary constituency of Gloucester unsuccessfully in 1734.

Hyett was probably responsible for the current façade of Hyatt House, a grade II listed building in Westgate Street, Gloucester.

== Family ==
Hyett married a widow, Henrietta Maria Holker (née James), by whom he had a son Benjamin, who was appointed a freeman of Gloucester in 1762.

== Death ==
Hyett died in 1777. His Will is held by the British National Archives at Kew.
