= Ralph Wallace =

Ralph Wallace may refer to:

- Ralph Wallace (Texas politician)
- Ralph W. Wallace, member of the California legislature

== See also ==
- Ralph Wallis (died 1669), nonconformist pamphleteer
- Ralph Wallace Burton (1905–1983), Ottawa Valley artist
