= Edge, Gloucestershire =

Village in Gloucestershire, England

Coordinates: 51.787°N 2.221°W

Edge
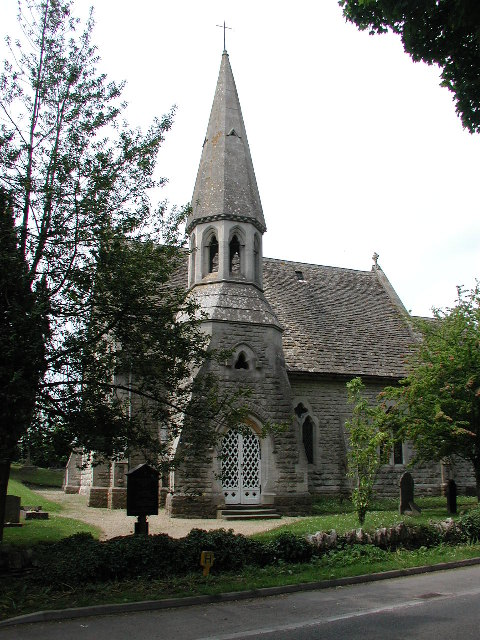
- Church of St John the Baptist

- Location within Gloucestershire
- Civil parish: Painswick
- District: Stroud
- Shire county: Gloucestershire
- Region: South West
- Country: England
- Sovereign state: United Kingdom
- Post town: Stroud
- Postcode district: GL6
- Dialling code: 01452
- Police: Gloucestershire
- Fire: Gloucestershire
- Ambulance: South Western
- UK Parliament: Stroud

Edge is a village in the civil parish of Painswick, Gloucestershire, England. The village is situated in an area of the Cotswolds that falls within the Stroud District.

== Government ==
For the purposes of local government, Edge is a constituent village of the Painswick civil parish, which also includes the neighbouring villages of Sheepscombe and Slad. The civil parish forms part of the district of Stroud and the county of Gloucestershire.

For parliamentary purposes, Edge is within the UK constituency of Stroud. Prior to Brexit in 2020, it was in the European constituency of South West England.

== Facilities ==
The village is served by the church of St John the Baptist, which is a part of the diocese of Gloucester. The village hosts a village hall and green, which are used for various functions including the annual Edge village fête.

The village has two adjacent commons. Rudge Hill Common (formerly Edge Common), to the SSW is largely limestone grassland and forms part of the Cotswolds Commons and Beechwoods NNR. Huddinknoll Common to the N of the village is managed by Natural England.

The village is intersected by several byways and the Cotswold Way national trail passes 0.5km to the South of the village.

== Notable Buildings ==
The parish church of St. John the Baptist is a perpendicular style building originally constructed in 1865, architect S.W. Dawkes. It is faced in freestone dressings and has an octagonal tower with a bell-turret. The interior is largely unaltered and has a conventional chancel and nave plan with one aisle to the North side. Adjacent are the original National School and Schoolhouse dating from the 1870's.

The centre of the village has several mid to late C17 farm buildings and cottages bounding the village green and the former Congregational Chapel, dated 1854.

== Notable residents ==
To the West is the adjacent hamlet of Stockend. The author C. Henry Warren rented a property here and used this as a basis for his 1936 book 'A Cotswold Year' wherein he detailed a year living in this part of the rural Gloucestershire.
