= Hyatt House, Gloucester =

Hyatt House
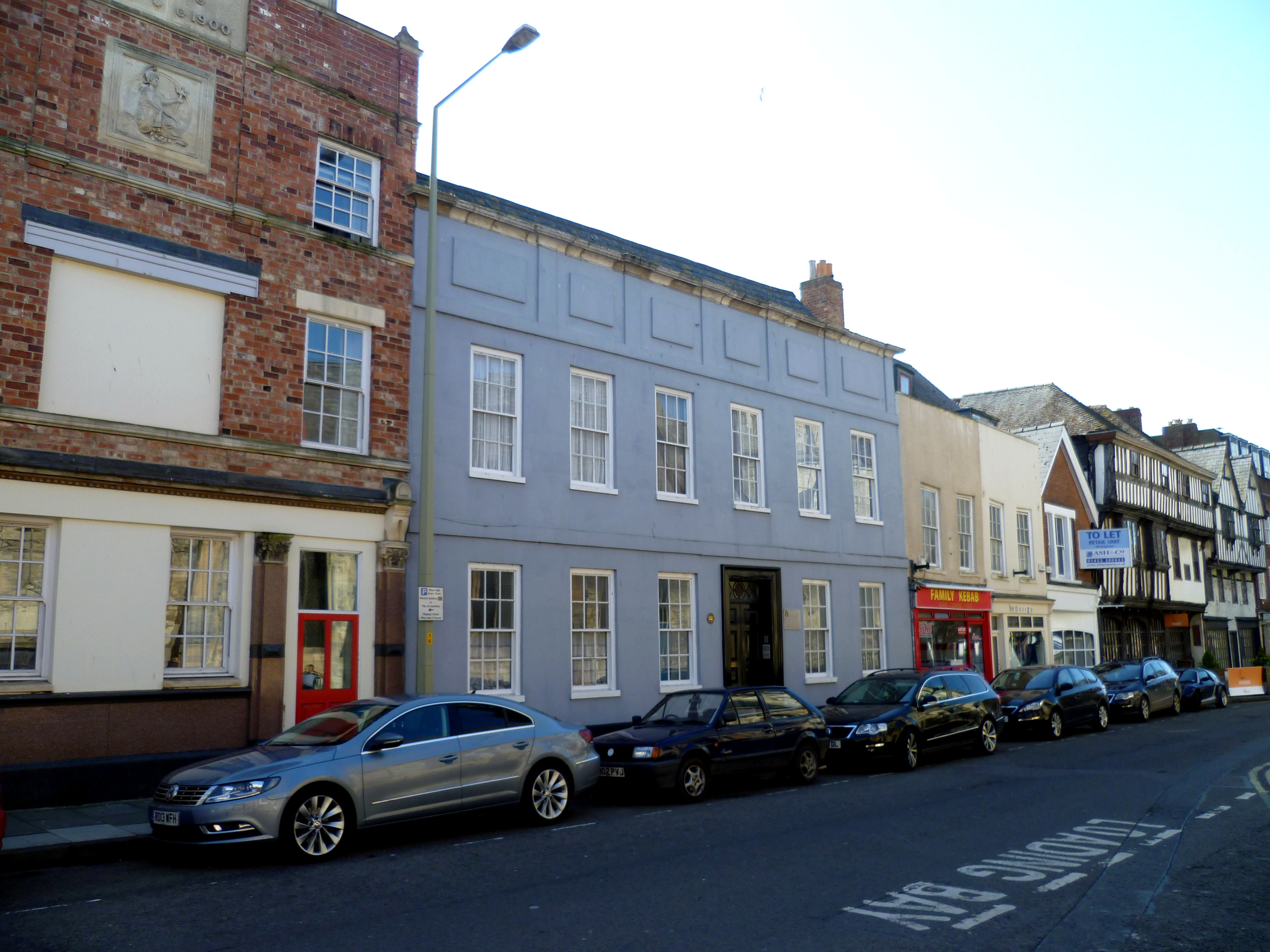
- Hyatt House

- Location in Gloucestershire
- 51°52′01″N 2°14′59″W
- Location: Gloucester, England

Hyatt House, or Hyett House, is a grade II listed building at 91 Westgate Street in the English city of Gloucester. The building is of a timber frame with stone and was probably constructed in the 16th century. According to a plaque on the building, an earlier dwelling stood on the site at least as early as 1455. The current façade was probably constructed by Nicholas Hyett (1709–1777), a local lawyer and justice of the peace. In 1988 the building was converted to flats by Avondown Housing Association and Gloucester City Council.
