= Painswick Town Hall =

Municipal building in Painswick, Gloucestershire, England

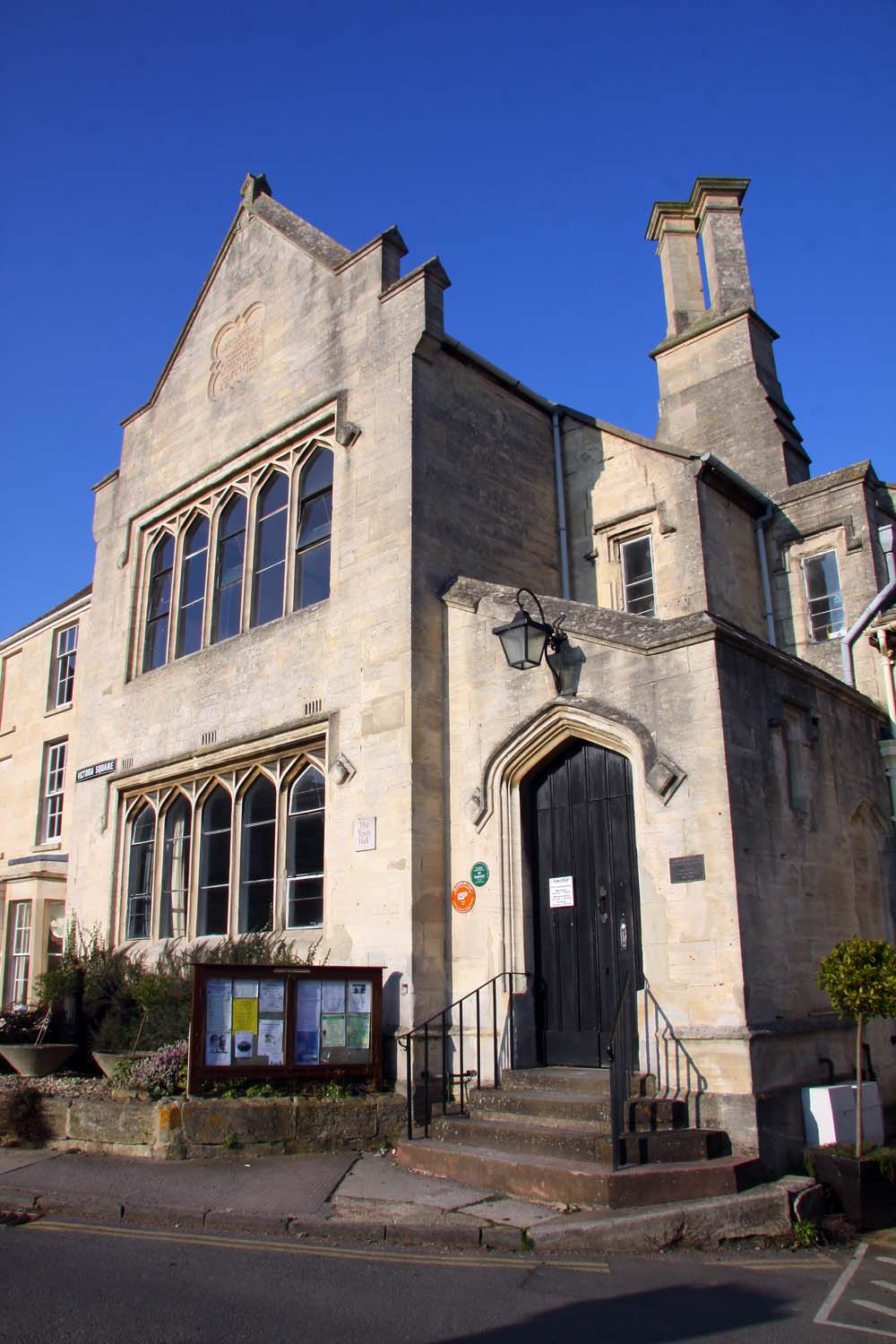
- Painswick Town Hall

- Shown in Gloucestershire
- 51.7860°N 2.1947°W
- Location: Victoria Square, Painswick

History
- Built: 1840

Site notes
- Architectural style: Tudor Revival style

Listed Building – Grade II
- Official name: Town Hall, Victoria Street
- Designated: 24 August 1990
- Reference no.: 1091564

Painswick Town Hall is a municipal building in Victoria Square, Painswick, Gloucestershire, England. The building, which is used as an events venue and also as the offices of Painswick Parish Council, is a Grade II listed building.

== History ==
The first municipal building in Painswick was a structure on the south side of Victoria Square close to St Mary's Parish Church on a site known as "Jumbles Den". The building, known as the "Stock House", included a school and a lock-up for petty criminals and was completed in 1628. A workhouse was subsequently built behind the old Stock House but, by the early 19th century, the old Stock House had become dilapidated and the parish leaders decided to demolish the old buildings and to commission a new Stock House on the north side of the square. The old Stock House was duly demolished and, re-purposed as a garden: in 1920, it became the site of a new war memorial, designed by F. L. Griggs in the form of a shaft with an octagonal head to commemorate the lives of local service personnel who had died in the First World War.

The new building was designed in the Tudor Revival style, built in limestone and was completed in 1840. The design involved a main frontage with just one bay facing onto Victoria Square; on both the ground floor and the first floor there were five-light casement windows with pointed heads to the lights. There was a stepped gable above, which contained a quatrefoil-shaped panel with an inscription commemorating the old Stock House, and a lean-to structure to the right containing an arched doorway giving access to the main building. Internally, the principal rooms were the lower hall, which was used as an events venue, and the upper hall, which was used as a school classroom from 1844 until 1867.

In the late 20th century, the author, Laurie Lee, who wrote the autobiographical trilogy Cider with Rosie, As I Walked Out One Midsummer Morning and A Moment of War, was a frequent visitor to receptions held in the town hall.

Following the closure of the old public library on the east side of Stroud Road in December 2009, a major refurbishment of the town hall took place in spring 2012, and a new community library, established with financial support from Gloucestershire County Council, opened on the first floor of the building in May 2012. A room on the ground floor was made available for use as a post office and the parish council moved back into an office on the first floor of the building.
