= Charles Stanton Devas =

English political economist

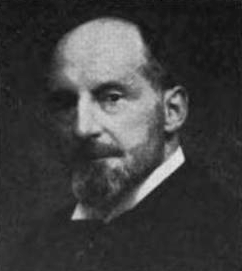
- Born: 26 August 1848; Woodside, Old Windsor, England
- Died: 6 November 1906 (aged 58)
- Education: Eton College; Balliol College, Oxford
- Occupation: Political economist
- Spouse: Eliza Mary Katherine Ward (m. 1874; died 1889)
- Children: 9

Charles Stanton Devas (26 August 1848 – 6 November 1906) was an English political economist.

== Life ==
Charles Stanton Devas was born in Woodside, Old Windsor on 26 August 1848. He was educated at Eton and Balliol College, Oxford, where he took a first class in the honours School of Law and History. Before proceeding to the university he had been received into the Roman Catholic Church and his subsequent career was entirely devoted to the service of religion. By treating political economy, both in books and lectures, from a definitely Catholic standpoint, he was unusual in his field at the time.

The Groundwork of Economics (1883), the first work published in his own name (for the translation into English of Hergenröther's Church and State was anonymous), attracted considerable attention and was translated into German in 1896 by Walter Kampfe. The Manual of Political Economy (Stonyhurst Philosophical Series), published in 1892 (third edition, 1907), achieved more success, and became a recognised textbook in English-speaking schools and seminaries. In 1886, he published Studies in Family Life, a historical inquiry into this branch of economics, with a view to justifying the contention that Christianity is an essential factor in the problem of social well-being. This book was translated into German in 1887 by Paul Maria Baumgarten. In 1895 he published anonymously in London a poetical version of the story of Sintram.

Besides his books he wrote frequently for The Dublin Review, The Month, and other periodicals, both English and American, and read papers before The Manchester Statistical Society, The Catholic Truth Society, and other bodies. A considerable number of his later essays and lectures dealing with contemporary social problems were issued by The Catholic Truth Society in pamphlet form. He was a contributor to the Catholic Encyclopedia. His last book, The Key to the World's Progress, was published in 1906. This, unlike his earlier works, is directly apologetic, being an elaborate defence of the Catholic Church written with a view to meeting the difficulties and questionings of the twentieth century. A popular edition was issued after his death.

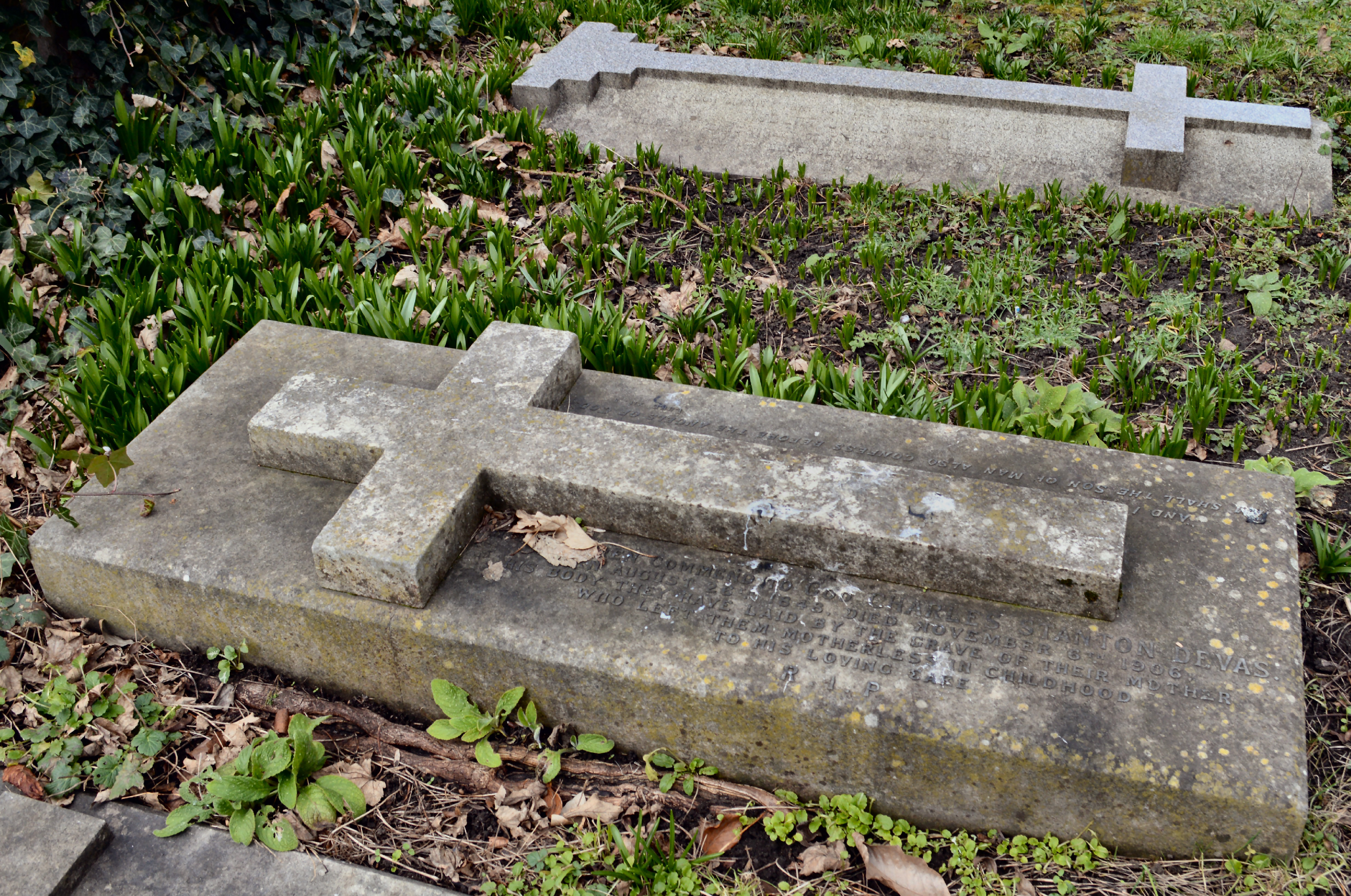
St Mary Magdalen, Mortlake

In 1874 he married Eliza Mary Katherine, the daughter of Francis Ridout Ward. She died in 1889, leaving nine children. Devas was a zealous member of the Society of St. Vincent de Paul, and took a leading part in all Catholic enterprises of his time in England - notably in those which enabled Catholics to frequent universities - and exercised considerable influence over the thought and conduct of English Catholics. He was examiner in Political Economy at the Royal University of Ireland from 1889 to 1898.

Charles Stanton Devas died on 6 November 1906, and is buried at St Mary Magdalen Roman Catholic Church, Mortlake.
