= Woodside, Old Windsor =

Estate in Old Windsor, Berkshire, England

Coordinates: 51.449527°N 0.586932°W

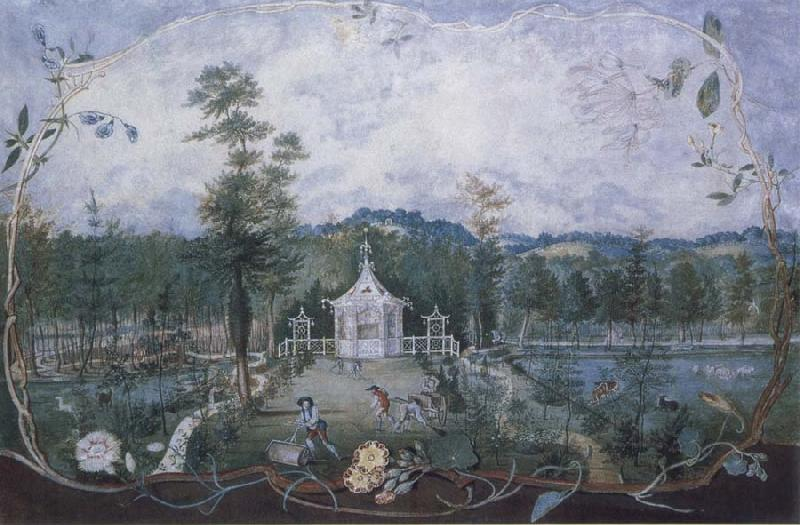
The Chinese Kiosk, Woodside, Old Windsor. Thomas Robins the Elder, 1750s. Private collection.

Woodside is a large detached house with 37 acres (15 ha) of gardens in Old Windsor, Berkshire, on the edge of Windsor Great Park. The house has been rebuilt several times since the 18th century. The Rococo gardens of Woodside were laid out in the mid-18th century and depicted by the artist Thomas Robins the Elder. The gardens were subsequently redesigned under Rosemary Verey and Roy Strong in the 1980s and 1990s. Woodside has been the home of the musician Sir Elton John since 1975.

== History ==
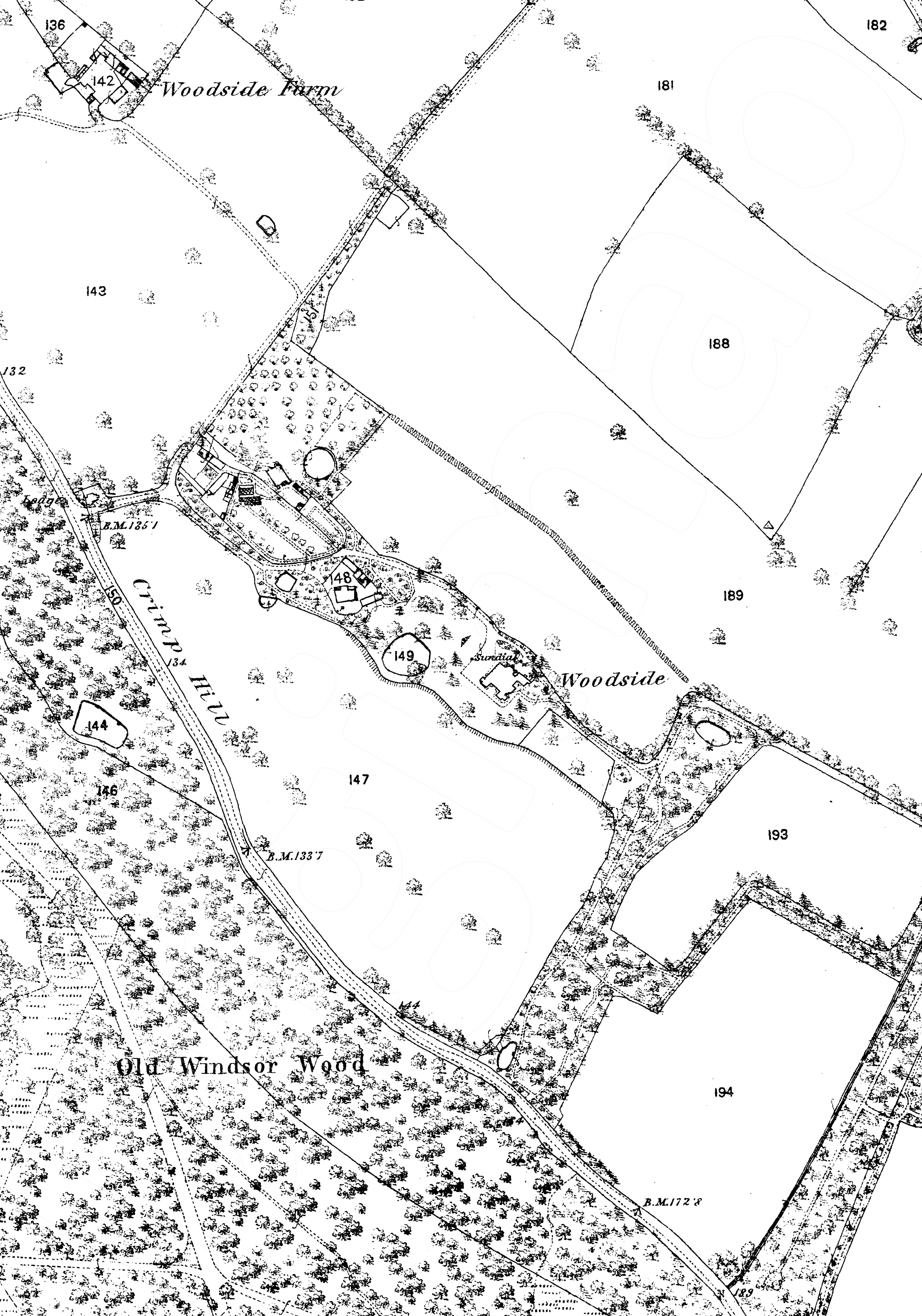
Woodside (centre) on an 1870 Ordnance Survey map

Woodside was originally built in the 1500s for Henry VIII's surgeon, the site chosen so that the occupant could be summoned by an emergency flag flown at Windsor Castle. The house subsequently burnt down and has been rebuilt three times, most recently in 1947 in a style described as "post war mock Georgian". At the time of Woodside's 1989 refurbishment the house consisted of eight bedrooms, five reception rooms, a billiard room, and a squash court in 37 acres (15 ha) of grounds.

=== 18th century ===
In 1752 Hugh Hammersley acquired Woodside upon his marriage to Ann Clark. By 1755 Hammersley had rebuilt the house in the fashionable Gothic revival style and laid out extensive plantings of shrubberies and flower gardens around the property. Hammersley's Rococo gardens at Woodside were captured in three paintings by Thomas Robins the Elder, including a 'Chinese kiosk', an early example of chinoiserie which was inspired by the Chinese Pavilion at Kew Gardens. Robins's paintings are the only evidence for the composition of Woodside's gardens in the 18th century.

A broadside ballad of the 1750s in the English Broadside Ballad Archive collated by the University of California, Santa Barbara recounts the tale of a 'human monster' who resided at Woodside who had been "noted for the infamous feat of eating a cat alive" and that he had been "apprehended and committed to gaol, on a charge of murdering an infant six years old".

=== 19th century ===
Woodside was the home of John Ramsbottom (1778–1845), Member of Parliament for New Windsor between 1810 and 1845. The 1828 Visitants' guide to Windsor castle and its vicinity described Woodside as "having a very commanding appearance", surrounded by a "handsome park", and noted that it was "situated on the gentle declivity of a hill stretching from the Great Park to the Thames". According to the guide, the house was built during the reign of King George II.

Woodside was advertised for sale in The Times in July 1849 through Messrs Daniel Smith and Sons. The advertisement described a "substantial mansion of the Elizabethan style of architecture" situated in a small park "studded with venerable old oaks and other valuable timber". The estate was listed at 122 acres (49 ha) including a small farm, "walled gardens, beautiful pleasure rounds, a conservatory, an ornamental cottage residence and farmhouse buildings".

It was purchased at that time by the merchant William Devas, and was therefore the childhood home of the political economist Charles Stanton Devas.

=== 20th century ===
Colonel William Webb Follett died at Woodside in April 1926. His widow, Lady Julia Alice Kennedy, daughter of The 2nd Marquess of Ailsa, lived on at the house until her death in December 1936. A fire at the house in April 1928 considerably damaged woodwork and paneling dating back to the time of James II, and a 'large and historic old fireplace' had to be demolished to make way for the fire services. A wooden beam that had been 'smouldering for weeks' was believed to be the cause. Lady Julia's obituary in The Times wrote of her that "She never used a telephone or drove in a car, and her house, the largest in the village, was lit with oil lamps".

== Elton John ==
Since 1975 the house has been the principal residence of the English musician and composer Sir Elton John. John also owns an apartment in Atlanta, Georgia, a villa in Nice on the French Cote d'Azur and a house in London's Holland Park district. John bought the house for £400,000 in 1974 (£3,792,304 at current prices) and subsequently brought in his collections of what the music writer Mick Brown described as 'High Rock'n'Roll Empire', including "jukeboxes and pinball machines; Tiffany lamps and art deco nymphs; red leather sofas; the odd Rembrandt etching; a disco; [and] a replica of Tutankhamun's state throne". The house also stored John's many costumes from his tours and the 4-foot-high (1.2 m) Doc Marten boots that he wore in the 1975 film Tommy. The contents of the house were subsequently sold at auction for $8.2 million at a 2,000-item four-day sale at Sotheby's in September 1988. John decided to refurbish and redesign Woodside after overcoming drink and drug addictions in the late 1980s, feeling that he "didn't want to be a middle-aged man who was a parody of his younger self" and that the house contained "a lot of kitsch ...it was more of an Aladdin's cave than a home."

The subsequent redesign and refurbishment of the house was begun in 1989 and took three years initially whilst John was on tour supporting his then current album Sleeping With The Past. It was carried out by Adrian Cooper-Grigg and Andrew Protheroe, with the proviso that they should attempt to create an English country house that resembled the seat of a well established family with their objects accumulated over successive generations. Protheroe said that John "wanted it to look like something that had evolved ...something that had happened instead of being contrived"; the pair consequently acquired many antiques and objets d'art. Brown described the interior decoration on his 2010 visit as consisting of "capacious sofas – an aura of Aubusson, cut moquette, damask – and deep carpets. There are vases spilling with flowers, elaborately carved tables, every surface covered with exquisite porcelain." The restrictions on building materials after the Second World War meant that Woodside's ceilings are comparatively low at only 8 feet 6 inches (2.6 m), and to increase the perceived height of the rooms Cooper-Grigg and Protheroe added columns and mouldings and allowed draperies to pool on the floor.

The indoor swimming pool was redesigned to resemble an ancient Roman bath and the front entrance was designed to highlight the enfilade that centres on a gazebo and waterfall in the gardens. A shell room was created with conches and cockle shells over a four-month period. An 18th-century orangery at the end of the drive was restored in the late 1990s. Viscount Linley designed a marquetry screen that surrounds the bed in the master bedroom, and a chest of drawers in which some of John's collection of hundreds of spectacles are kept. John's archive of 70,000 CDs is housed next to the gym.

Woodside is the site of The White Tie and Tiara Ball, an annual charitable ball held to raise money for the Elton John AIDS Foundation.

== Art ==
The main house is hung with mainly 18th- and 19th-century paintings, including works by Helen Allingham, Arthur Devis, Thomas Gainsborough, Henry Scott Tuke, and watercolours by Edward Lear.

A former garage block situated at the rear of the main house has been redesigned as a purpose-built art gallery; it stands between the main house and Woodside's tennis court. It was designed by the architect Jack Schneider and was completed in 2009. One wall of the gallery is clad in copper, with another featuring a running waterfall. The mezzanine level of the gallery is home to a large library of art books. The writer Mick Brown described entering the gallery as "like stepping into an adjunct" of the Tate Modern. The gallery contains a large tapestry of John by Chuck Close given as a present by Close for John's 60th birthday, as well as pieces by Louise Bourgeois, Jake and Dinos Chapman, Gilbert and George, Antony Gormley, Andreas Gursky, Damien Hirst, Philip Taaffe, and a self-portrait by Gillian Wearing.

== Gardens ==
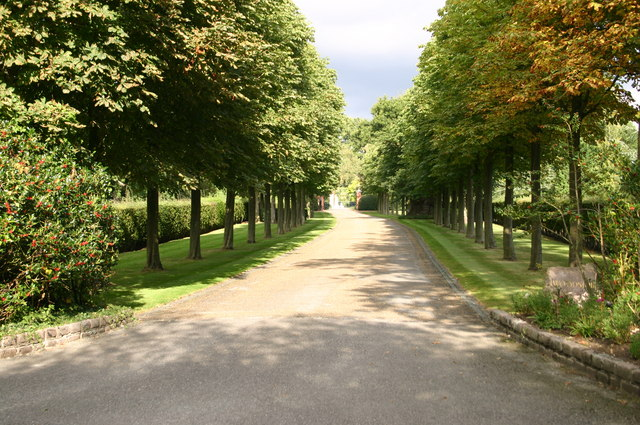
The drive and main entrance of Woodside in 2007

The present gardens at Woodside were laid out in the late 1980s by the garden designers Gordon Taylor and Guy Cooper under the direction of Rosemary Verey. Verey's biographer, Barbara Paul Robinson, felt that working for John with his large annual expenditure on Woodside was a welcome change for her since she had become used to clients who complained about costs. After being contacted by John's personal assistant in 1987, Verey recalled the name 'Woodside' from Robins's 18th-century paintings of the Rococo garden, and found a limited edition of a book featuring the paintings, which she presented to John. Verey was asked for a detailed garden plan for Woodside at short notice in 1988, and enlisted the help of Taylor and Cooper as she had no garden staff of her own. She described herself as an 'advisor' on the garden project, which involved detailed minuted meetings with landscape designers, architects and full-time gardeners. A water garden at Woodside with spouting fountains, large 'overflowing' flowering pots and scented borders was inspired by the Generalife gardens of the Alhambra in Granada. Verey claimed credit for its creation against the wishes of other gardeners; it is not clear who is responsible for its creation.

Verey initially planted and helped develop a white garden, a rainbow border (nicknamed the Ribbon Borders) inspired by Gertrude Jekyll, a scented garden, and an 18th-century garden at Woodside. The drive toward the main entrance of the house is lined with white rose bushes. Verey's white garden at Woodside was inspired by the white garden at the Sissinghurst Castle Garden, designed by Vita Sackville-West. Verey toured the gardens of Woodside in her BBC documentary The English Country Garden, broadcast in October 1996. The art historian and garden designer Sir Roy Strong created a classical Italian garden for John, at the behest of John's friend the fashion designer Gianni Versace. Strong had previously created gardens for Versace at his homes in Lake Como and Florida, the Villa Fontanelle, and the Casa Casuarina, respectively. The creation of Strong's Italian garden of scarlet geraniums and boxwood necessitated the moving of Verey's white garden, which upset her. Verey complained to friends, saying that if John had wanted an Italian garden, "then why didn't he buy a house in Italy?!" and wrote that "Sadly (for me), Elton decided he wanted an Italian garden so after six years my white garden has gone and statues and vistas have taken over. I wonder, does an Italian garden blend with and complement an English Regency house?". John's head gardener, Helen Finch, maintained the gardens. Verey later attended John's 50th birthday at Woodside dressed as the rainbow border.

Various follies are scattered in the garden, including a red telephone kiosk and a red post box. In the woodland, a life-size fibreglass Tyrannosaurus named Daisy has eyes which light up when people pass by. Daisy was moved into the woodland by helicopter when the gardens were redesigned; she was a present to John from Ringo Starr (other sources say George Harrison or Paul McCartney). The T-Rex was previously in the gardens of Ringo's Tittenhurst Park, a 72-acre estate outside of Ascot that he had purchased from John Lennon in 1973. When Ringo sold Tittenhurst Park in 1988, the T-Rex was given to Elton John. A folly in the garden resembling nearby Windsor Castle was constructed as a stable for John's donkeys and pony during the late 1980s renovations.

The gardens are also home to a former W2-class Melbourne tram (No. 520) which John imported from Australia in the 1980s in what he described as one of "my drug-induced moments", stating in a 2010 interview that the tram cost "Ten thousand to buy it. And a million to ship it over".

The gardens of Woodside also contain an organic vegetable garden; one of John's pumpkins from the garden won third prize at a horticultural show. In 1997 the garden was maintained by a head gardener and five full-time gardeners. The gardens were the subject of the 1997 book Elton John's Flower Fantasies: An Intimate Tour of his House and Garden by Caroline Cass.
