= Philip Taaffe =

American artist

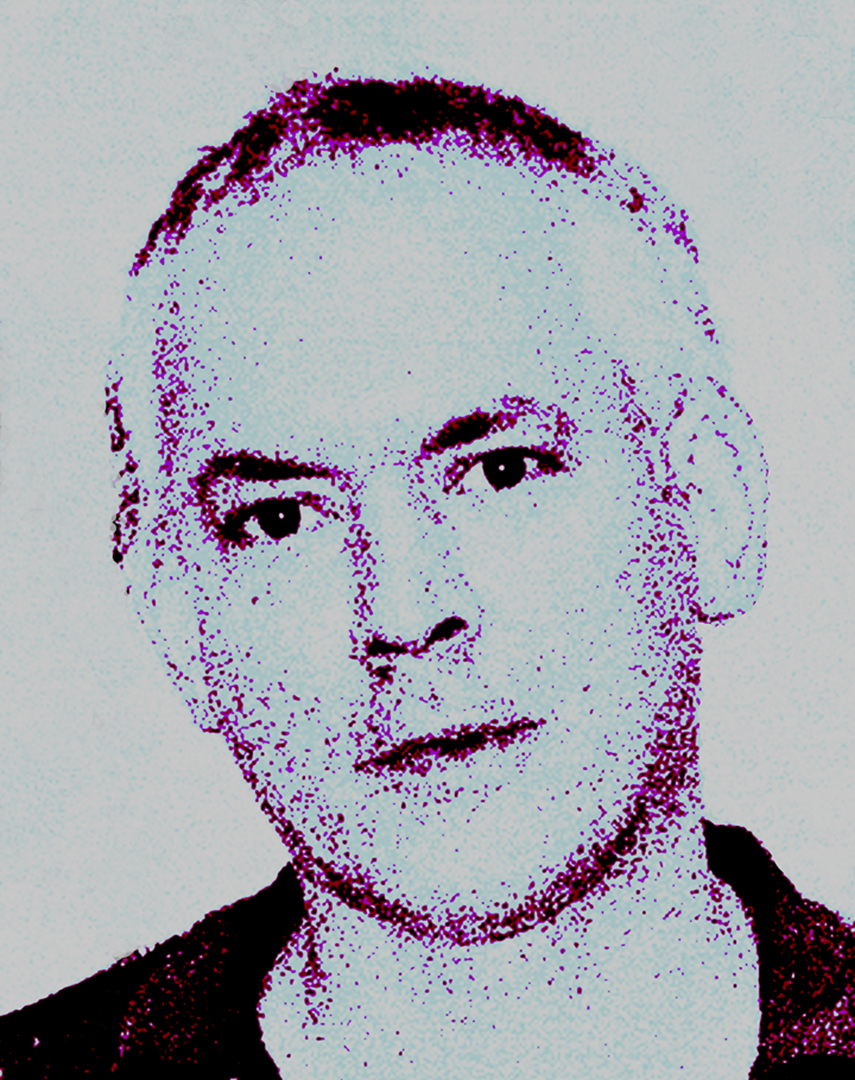
Philip Taaffe, New York City, September 2001

Philip Taaffe (born 1955) is an American artist, who has shown his works all around the world. His work sometimes blended motifs from multiple cultures.

We Are Not Afraid, 1985.

== Biography ==
Taaffe was born in Elizabeth, New Jersey and studied at the Cooper Union in New York, gaining a Bachelor of Fine Arts in 1977.

== Career ==
An admirer of Matisse's cut-outs and of Synthetic Cubism, from the mid-1980s he began to borrow images and designs directly from more recent artists. In We Are Not Afraid (1985), he develops Barnett Newman’s zip motif into a spiral; the title is a reply to Newman's series of paintings Who's Afraid of Red, Yellow and Blue (1966–70). In Defiance (1986), he reinterprets work by Bridget Riley.

His first solo exhibition was in New York in 1982. He has since been included in exhibitions at Carnegie International, two Sydney Bienniales, and three Whitney Bienniales. His work is held in the Museum of Modern Art, New York, the San Francisco Museum of Modern Art, the Philadelphia Museum of Art, and the Whitney Museum of American Art. A painting by Taaffe is in the private collection of Elton John at Woodside, Old Windsor; it had previously hung in Gianni Versace's townhouse in New York.

Taaffe lives and works in New York City.

Defiance, 1986.

== Sources ==
- Philip Taaffe, The Life of Forms, works 1980–2008 by Brooks Adams, Holger Broeker, Markus Brüderlin, and Kay Heymer; 2008; Kunstmuseum Wolfsburg, Hatje Cantz, Ostfildern; ISBN 978-3-7757-2121-9
- Philip Taaffe, Composite Nature by Stan Brakage; Peter Blum Editions, 1998, New York, ISBN 0-935875-16-6
- Philip Taaffe by Enrique Juncosa, Robert Rosenblum, and Robert Creely; IVAM Center del Carme, Generalitat Valenciana, 2000; ISBN 84-482-2395-0
- "Groveart Online Taaffe, Philip".
- "Gagosian Gallery – Philip Taaffe".
- Inside the Artist's Studio, Princeton Architectural Press, 2015. (ISBN 978-1616893040)
