= Painswick House =

Building in Painswick, Gloucestershire, England

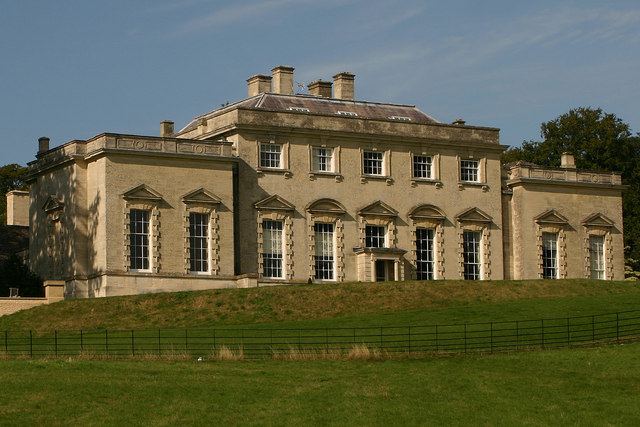

- Location within Gloucestershire
- 51.7927°N 2.1995°W
- Type: House and garden
- Location: Painswick, Stroud District, Gloucestershire, England

History
- Built: begun 1737, extended 1837

Site notes
- Architect(s): John Strahan, 18th-century work; George Basevi, 19th-century work
- Architectural style: Neoclassical

Listed Building – Grade I
- Official name: Painswick House
- Designated: 21 October 1955
- Reference no.: 1153435

National Register of Historic Parks and Gardens
- Official name: Painswick Rococo Garden
- Designated: 28 February 1986
- Reference no.: 1000181

Listed Building – Grade II*
- Official name: Eagle House 25M west of the stables
- Designated: 29 May 1968
- Reference no.: 1340532

Listed Building – Grade II*
- Official name: Pigeon House at Painswick House
- Designated: 24 August 1990
- Reference no.: 1090941

Listed Building – Grade II*
- Official name: Red House 150M north of the stables
- Designated: 24 August 1990
- Reference no.: 1304275

Listed Building – Grade II*
- Official name: Gothic Seat 150M south-west of Painswick House
- Designated: 24 August 1990
- Reference no.: 1153492

Painswick House is a Neoclassical country house in Painswick, Gloucestershire, England. It was built c.1737 for Charles Hyett by the architect John Strahan. It was extended in the 19th century by George Basevi for William Henry Hyett. In the 1740s, Benjamin Hyett, Charles' son and heir, created a Rococo pleasure ground to the north of the house. By the 1950s, the garden was derelict and planted over with conifers. Restored from the 1980s, based on a painting of the park by Thomas Robins the Elder dated 1748, it is now England's "sole surviving complete rococo garden". The garden is listed at Grade II* on the Register of Historic Parks and Gardens of Special Historic Interest in England, while the house is listed at Grade I.

== History ==
The house and a range of outbuildings were built in the 1730s by Charles Hyett to escape the smog of Gloucester but Hyett died in 1738 not long after moving there. He demolished an earlier farmhouse which stood on the site. It was originally known as "Buenos Ayres". Hyett's architect was likely John Strahan. (Note: Pevsner is not definitive as to the attribution of the house to Strahan, but notes the close similarities to his probable Frampton Court.) Around 1830 the house was extended by George Basevi adding the east and west wings. (Note: Both Historic England and British Listed Buildings Online misspell George Basevi's surname as "Baseri".)

== Architecture and description ==
The limestone building has tiled roofs. The nine-bay front has a central door set in an Ionic porch with a pediment. The interior of the building has many original fireplaces and makes extensive use of friezes for decoration.

== Painswick Rococo Garden ==
The grounds include the Painswick Rococo Garden, as it is now known, which was laid out by Charles's oldest son Benjamin (1708–62), the brother of Nicholas Hyett, constable and keeper of the Castle of Gloucester. The garden was painted by Thomas Robins the Elder in 1748. (Note: Alan Brooks, in his Gloucestershire 1: The Cotswolds volume, in the Pevsner Buildings of England series, revised and re-issued in 2000, notes the tradition that Robins may have designed the garden as well as painting it.) Robins's painting allowed the garden to be restored from the 1980s under the direction of Painswick's owner, Lord Dickinson, who inherited the house in 1955.

The garden is the only surviving garden of the rococo period which is open to the public. The Gardens Trust describes it as England's "sole surviving complete rococo garden". It was designed and laid out in the 1740s. The garden has been restored since 1984 having been abandoned in the 1950s. It includes woodland, flower and vegetable plots, garden buildings and a maze. Several snowdrops, particularly Galanthus 'Atkinsii' are found in the grounds. There are a series of ponds and streams on the slopes of the valley with small waterfalls. Some of the structures within the garden are reconstructions of original buildings, while others, such as the Exedra, are 20th-century recreations of buildings which were lost.

=== Historic listing designations ===
The house is a Grade I listed building while the garden is listed at Grade II* on the Register of Historic Parks and Gardens of Special Historic Interest in England. The garden and park contain 15 further listed structures. Those at the second highest grade, Grade II*, include: the Eagle House; the Pigeon House; the Red House; the Gothic Seat; the Ram House; a Classical seat; a wellhead; a Spring Head and associated pool; a statue of Pan and a pair of urns. Those listed at Grade II include: the stables; a carriage house; a pair of gates; and a lodge.

== Gallery ==
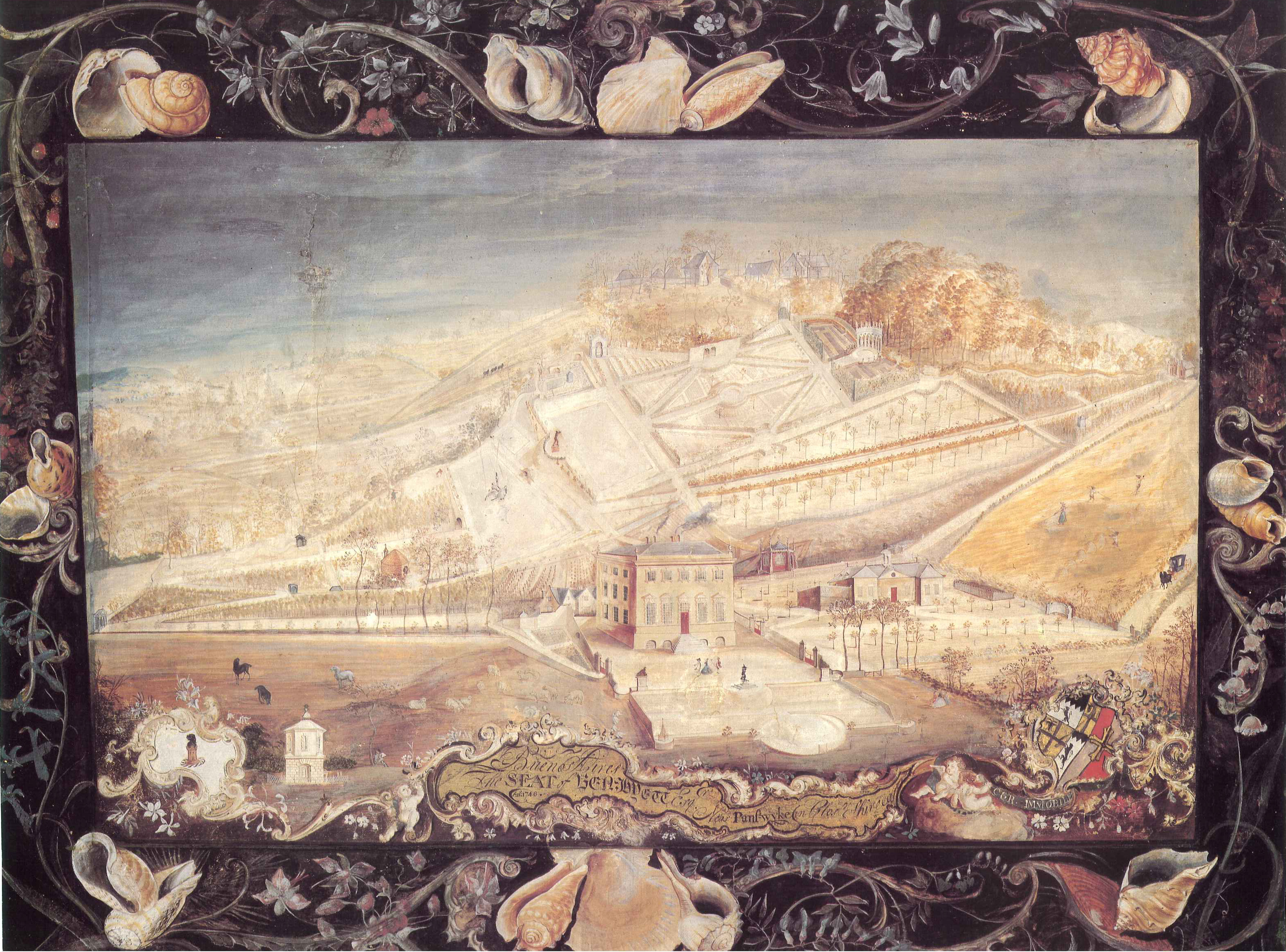
Painswick Rococo Garden, Thomas Robins the Elder, 1748

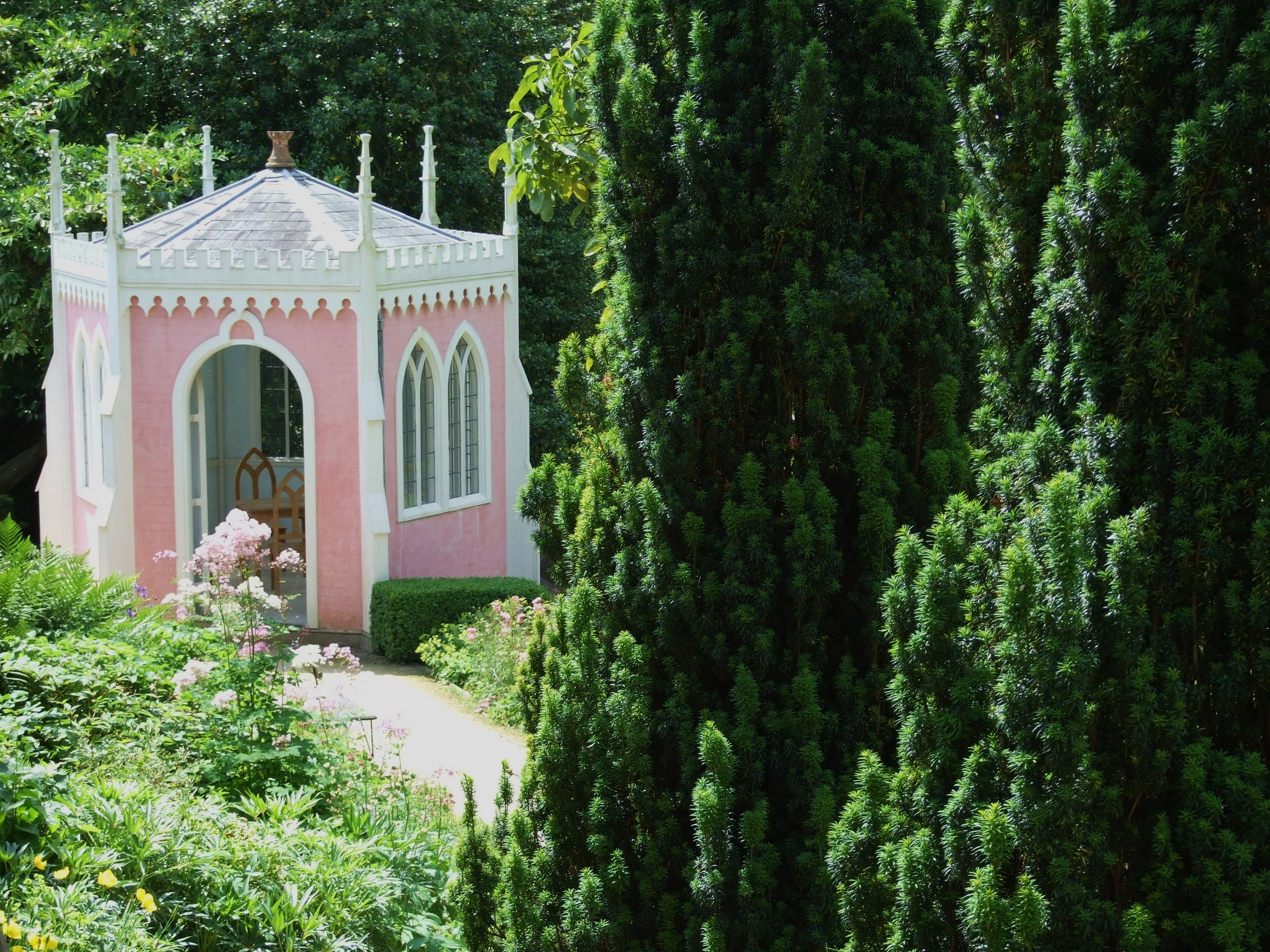
The Eagle House

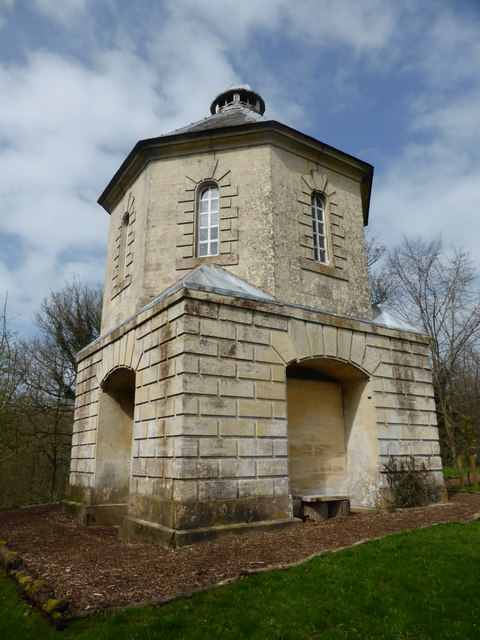
The Pigeon House

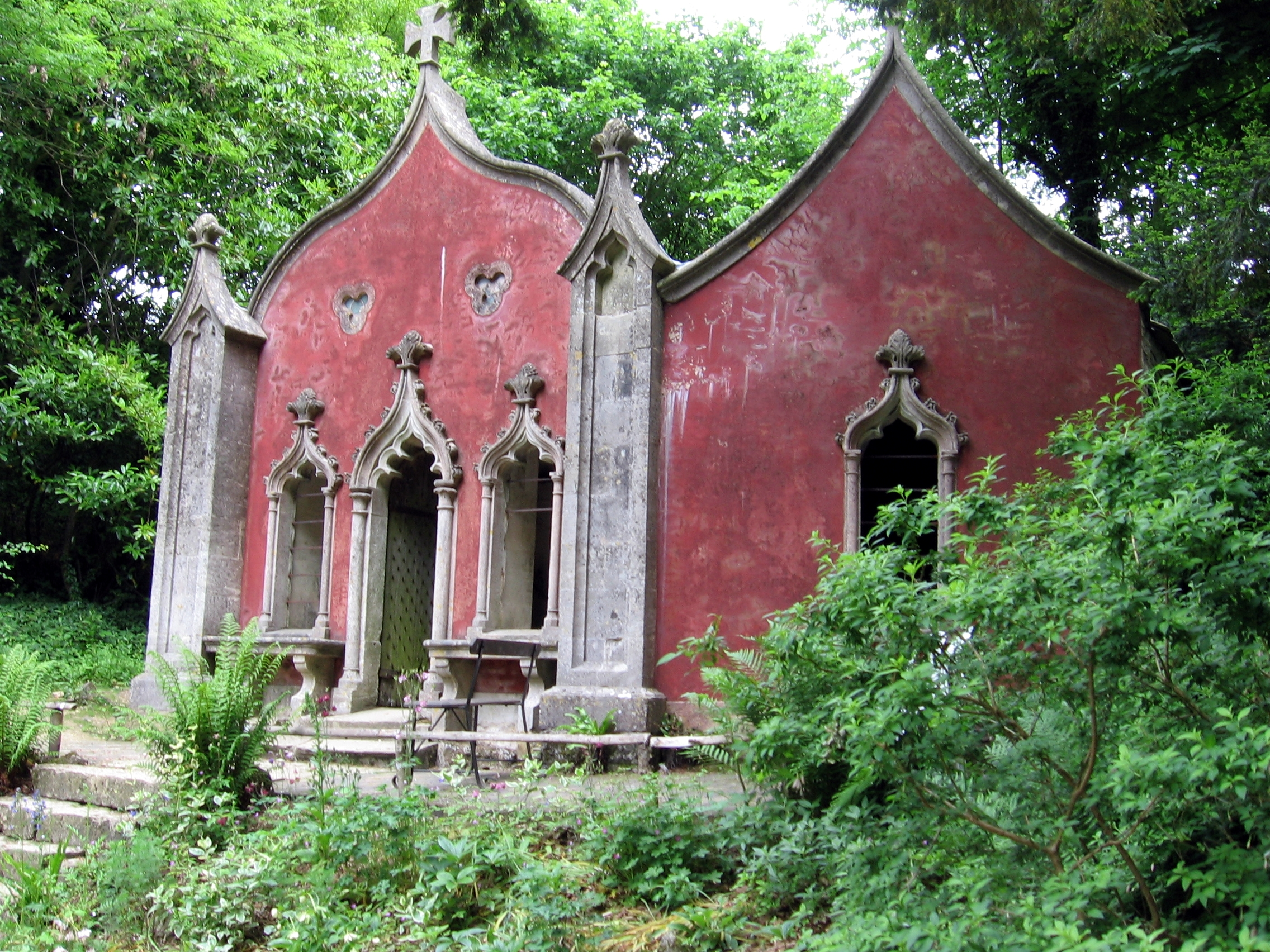
The Red House

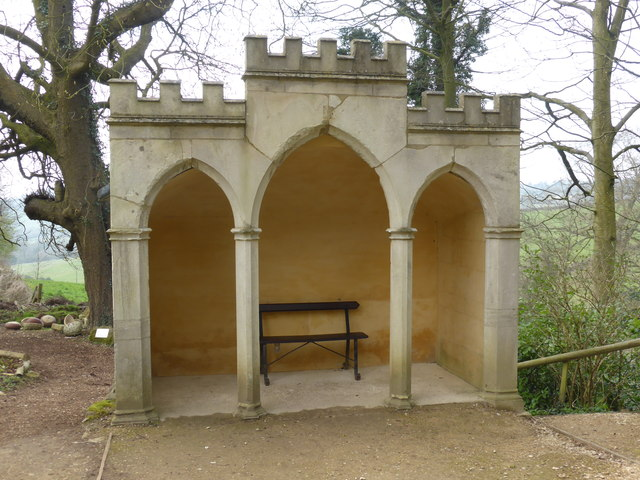
The Gothic Seat

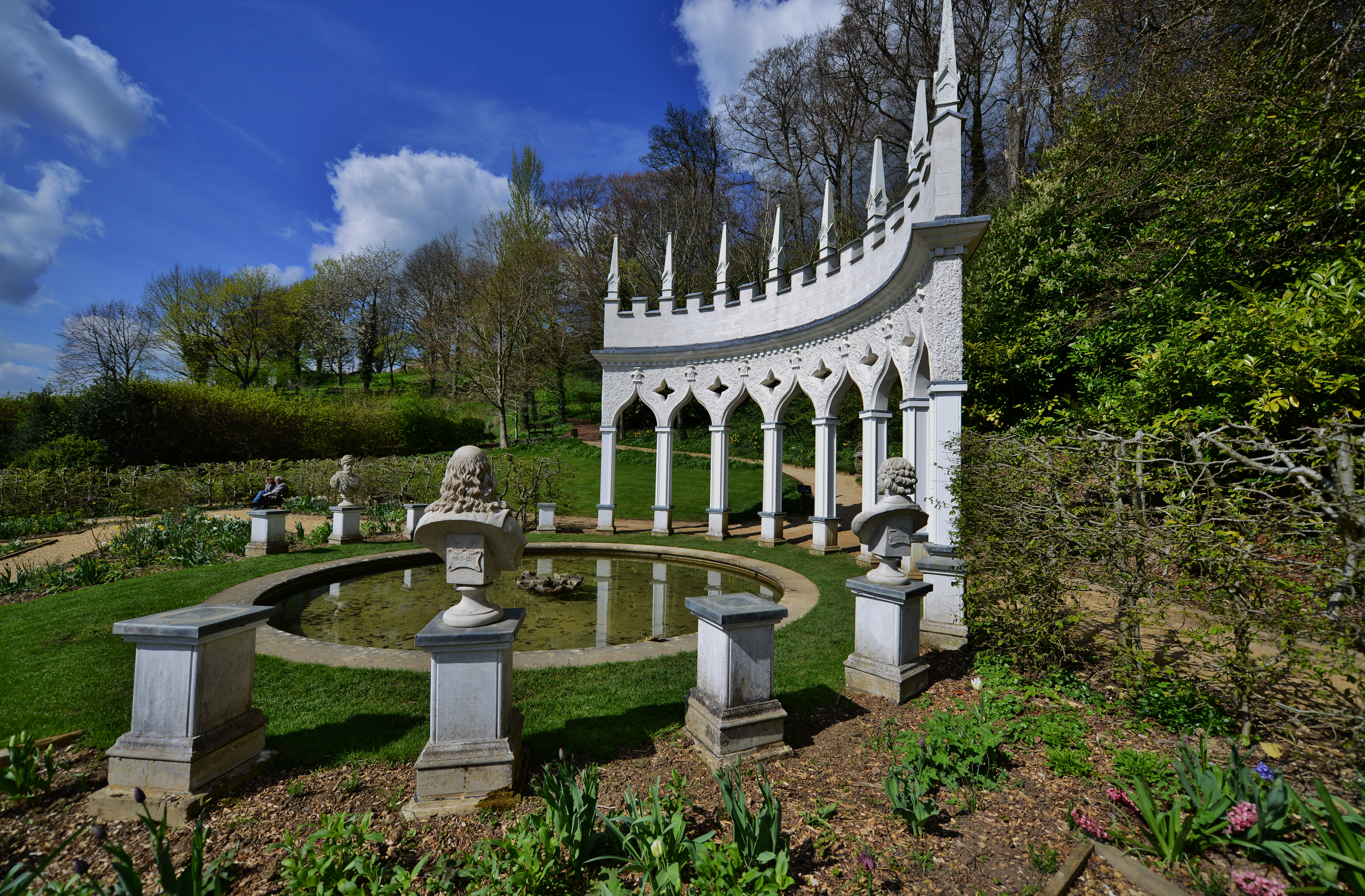
The Exedra

== Sources ==
- Baggs, A P; Jurica, A R J; Sheils, W J (1976). Painswick: Manors and other estates. A History of the County of Gloucester, Victoria County History. Vol. 11. Oxford: Oxford University Press. ISBN 978-0-197-22745-9.
- Verey, David; Brooks, Alan (2000) [1970]. Gloucestershire 1: The Cotswolds. The Buildings of England. New Haven, US and London: Yale University Press. ISBN 978-0-140-71098-4. OCLC 633122306.
