= Sheepscombe =

Village in Gloucestershire, England

Coordinates: 51.791364°N 2.155852°W

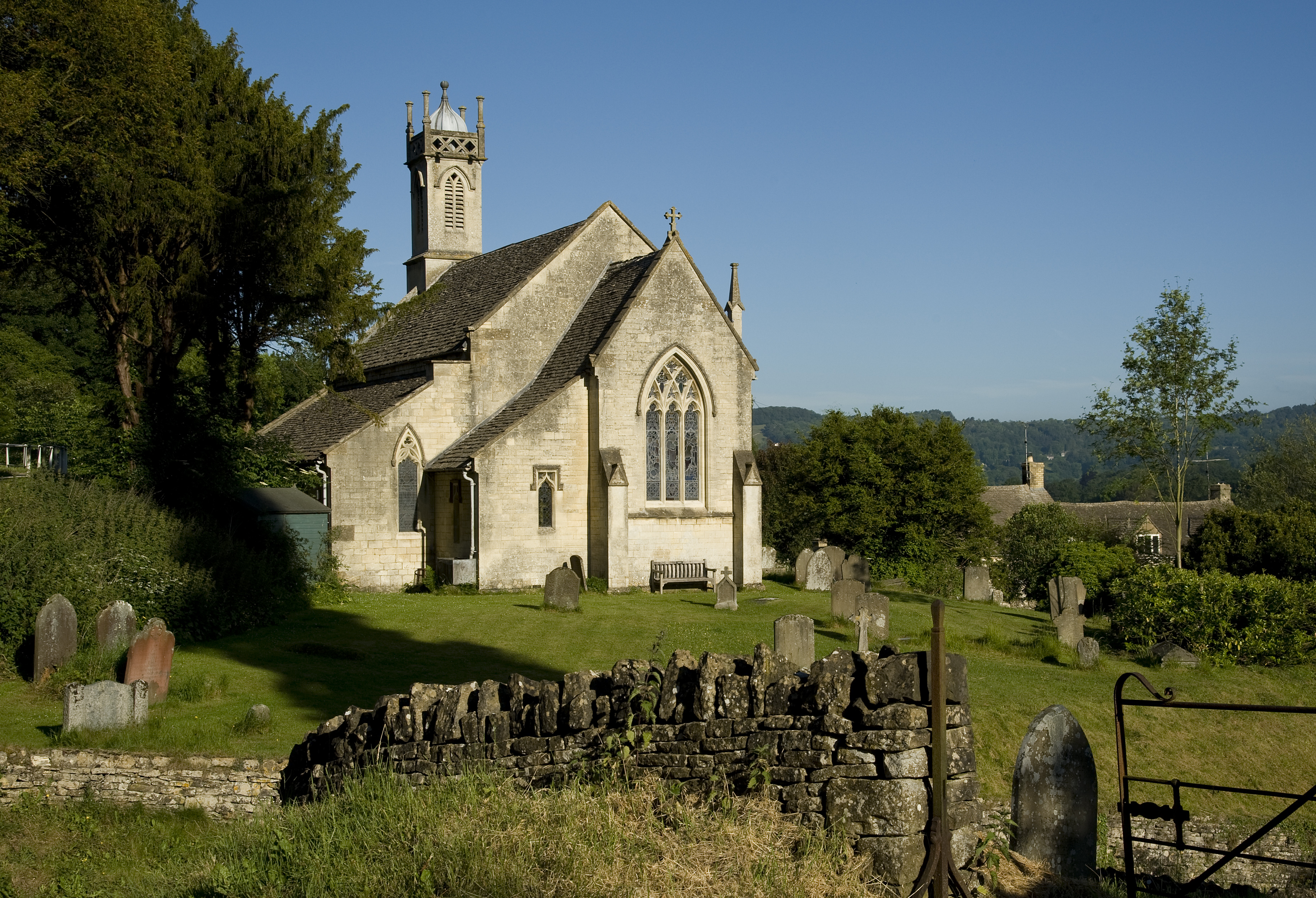
- St John the Apostle Church, est. 1820

- Location within Gloucestershire
- OS grid reference: SO896113
- Civil parish: Painswick
- District: Stroud
- Shire county: Gloucestershire
- Region: South West
- Country: England
- Sovereign state: United Kingdom
- Police: Gloucestershire
- Fire: Gloucestershire
- Ambulance: South Western
- UK Parliament: Stroud

Sheepscombe is a small village in the civil parish of Painswick, in the Stroud district, in the county of Gloucestershire, England. Sheepscombe is located some 6.5 miles (10 km) south-east of the city of Gloucester, 6 miles (10 km) north-east of the town of Stroud, and 1.5 miles (2 km) east of the village of Painswick. It lies in a narrow valley, hidden behind the Cotswold scarp, and just off the A46 and B4070 roads.

== Origin and name ==
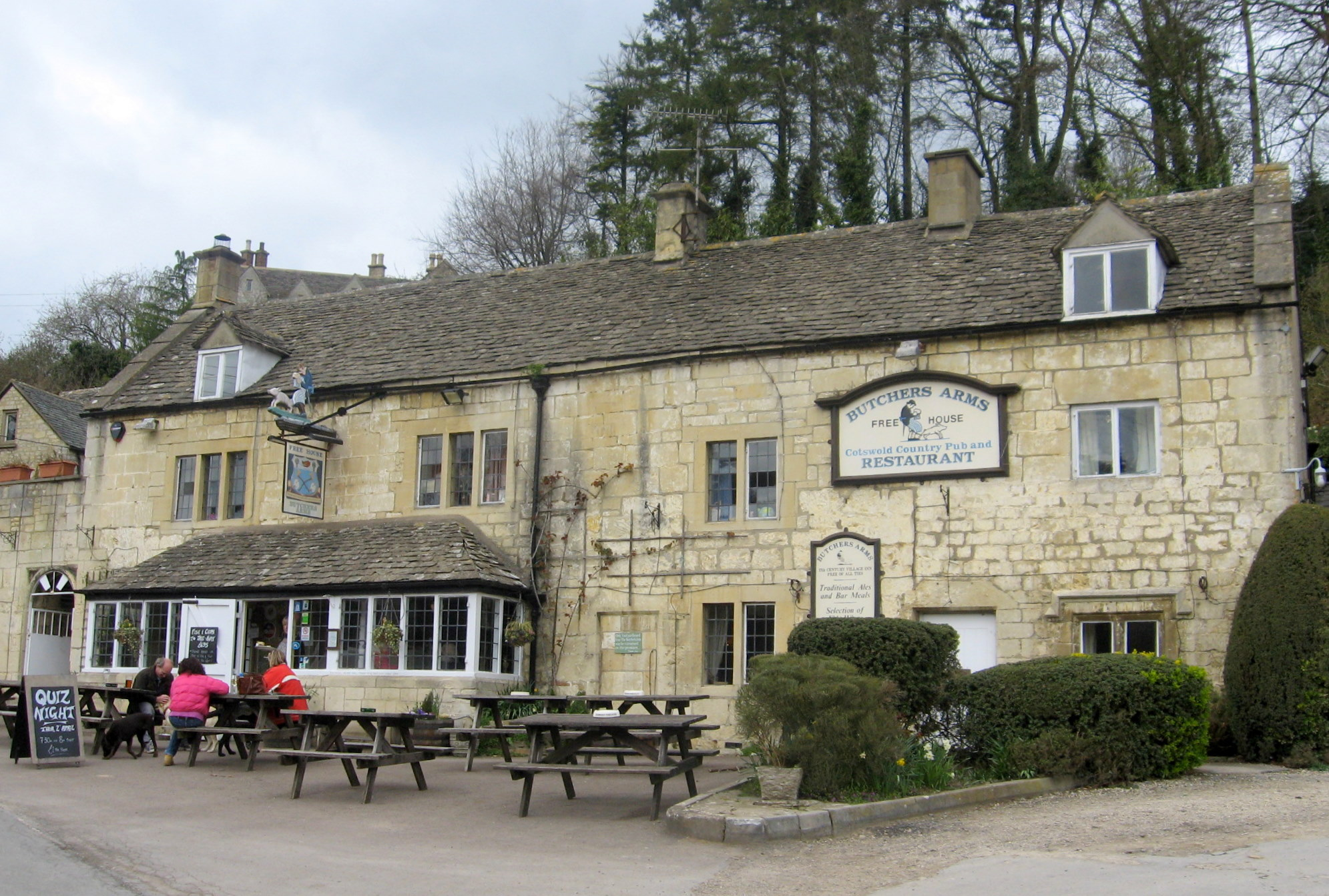
The village pub, the Butcher's Arms

The first record of the village dates from around 1260, with the original name of Sebbescumbe – the name possibly comes from the names of early local settlers named Ebba or Sebba. 'Combe' means valley. Variations of the name over the centuries have included Sebbescumbe, Sciapp'scombe, Sheppescombe, Sheppiscombe, Shepescombe, Shepyscombe, Shipscombe and Shepscombe.

== History ==
Since the early 17th century, Sheepscombe was involved in cloth making like many of the Cotswold towns in the area and its near neighbour Painswick. It enjoyed its industrial heyday during the late 18th and early 19th centuries, and the last mill closed in 1839. Following this, Sheepscombe suffered from increasing poverty and a falling population.

== Historic buildings ==
The village church, St John the Apostle, was built and opened in 1820. It was designed by John Wight, and later expanded in 1872 by Francis Niblett. It is constructed of limestone ashlar with a stone slate roof to coped gables. English Heritage has listed the church as Grade II for its special architectural and historic interest.

The school was opened in 1822, a modernised building opening on the same site in 1882. Many of the houses in the village, at the northern end, date from the late 17th and early 18th centuries. The village pub is the Butcher's Arms.

== Gentrification ==
During the early part of the 20th century, Sheepscombe was still a rural, agricultural village, but today it has become, like many Cotswold villages, an expensive and select place to live. Most of its inhabitants are of the professional middle classes, who pay considerably for the privilege of living there. Situated at the bottom of a steep valley, Sheepscombe is a relatively inaccessible village, and not easy to live in for those without a car.

== Notable people ==
Sheepscombe is the childhood home of the actor William Moseley and Mike Sadler, one of the original founders of the SAS.

== Government ==
For the purposes of local government, Sheepscombe is within the civil parish of Painswick, the district of Stroud and the county of Gloucestershire. The civil parish of Painswick also contains the neighbouring villages of Slad and Edge.

For parliamentary purposes, Sheepscombe is within the UK constituency of Stroud. Before Brexit in 2020, it was in the European constituency of South West England.
