= Baron Dickinson =

Title in the Peerage of the United Kingdom

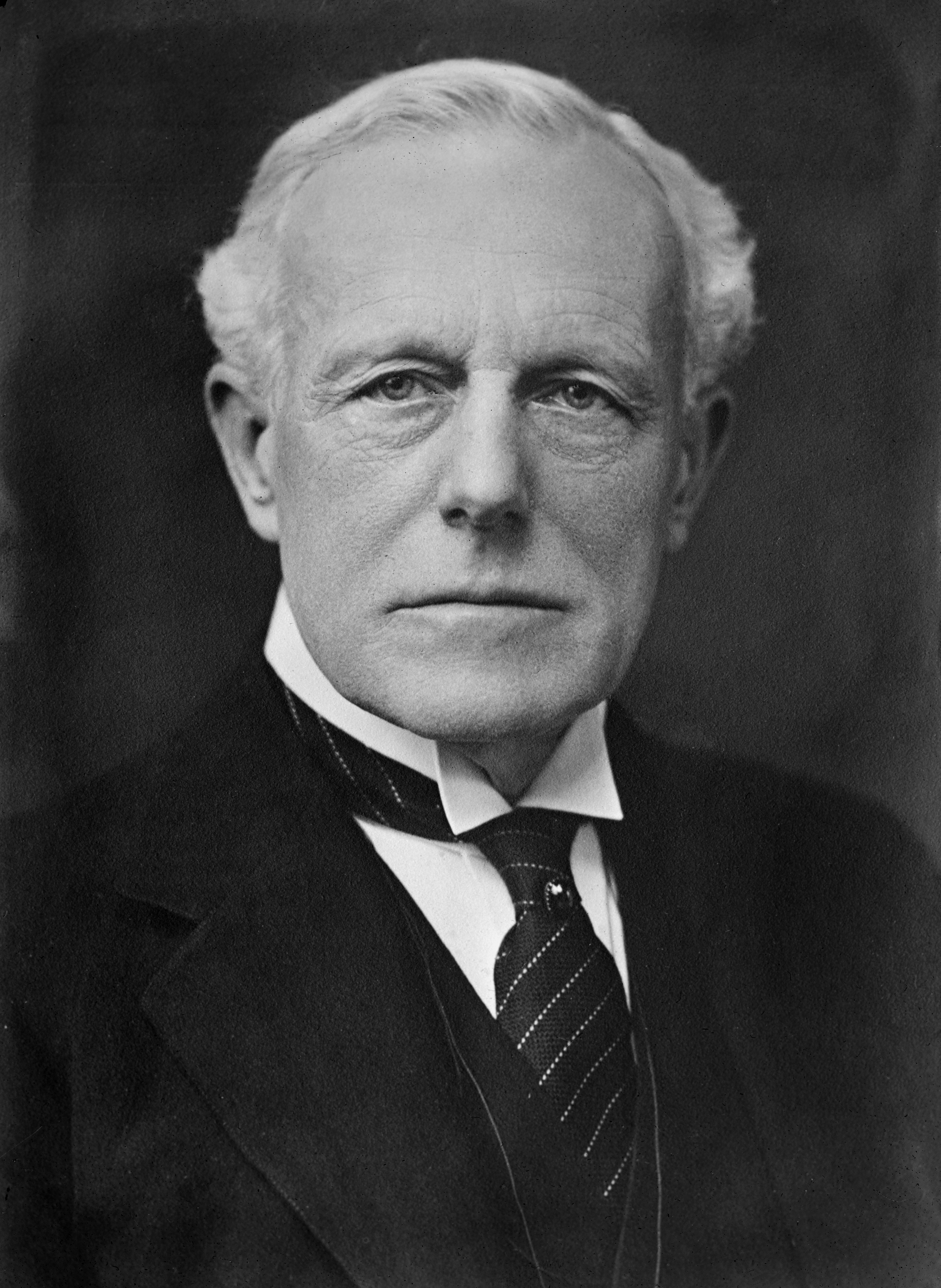
The 1st Baron Dickinson, KBE, PC

Baron Dickinson, of Painswick in the County of Gloucester, is a title in the Peerage of the United Kingdom. It was created on 18 January 1930 for the Liberal politician Sir Willoughby Dickinson, who previously represented St Pancras North as its MP in the House of Commons. He was the only son of Sebastian Dickinson, Member of Parliament for Stroud from 1868 to 1874, and a grandson of Major General Thomas Dickinson, IA (1784–1861).

Frances Davidson, Viscountess Davidson, DBE, younger daughter of the first Baron, was a Conservative Member of Parliament, created a Life Peeress as Baroness Northchurch in 1964.

The second Baron, Richard Dickinson, who inherited Painswick House in 1955, was director of the Painswick Garden Estate, a trustee of the Painswick Rococo Garden Trust and a liveryman of the Worshipful Company of Haberdashers. The eldest son of the Hon. Richard Dickinson DSO, only son of the first Baron, he succeeded his grandfather to the barony in 1943.

The Very Rev. Hon. Hugh Dickinson, Dean of Salisbury from 1986 until 1996, as well as Author the Hon. Peter Dickinson FRSL were the younger brothers of the second Baron.

As of 2024 the title is held by the first Baron's great-grandson, Martin Dickinson, as third Baron, who succeeded his father in 2019.

== Barons Dickinson (1930) ==
- Willoughby Hyett Dickinson, 1st Baron Dickinson, KBE (1859–1943)
  - Hon. Richard Sebastian Willoughby Dickinson (1897–1935)
- Richard Clavering Hyett Dickinson, 2nd Baron Dickinson (1926–2019)
- Martin Hyett Dickinson, 3rd Baron Dickinson (b. 1961)

The heir presumptive is the present Baron's brother the Hon. Andrew Dickinson (b. 1963)

== Arms ==
Coat of arms of Baron Dickinson
Crest Issuant from Clouds a dexter Cubit Arm erect the hand holding an olive branch fructed all Proper. Escutcheon Or a Bend cottised between two Lions passant Gules. Supporters Dexter, a Falcon Proper collared and lined Or; Sinister, a Dove holding in the beak an olive branch both Proper. Motto Seek Agreement
