= Thomas Robins the Elder =

English painter

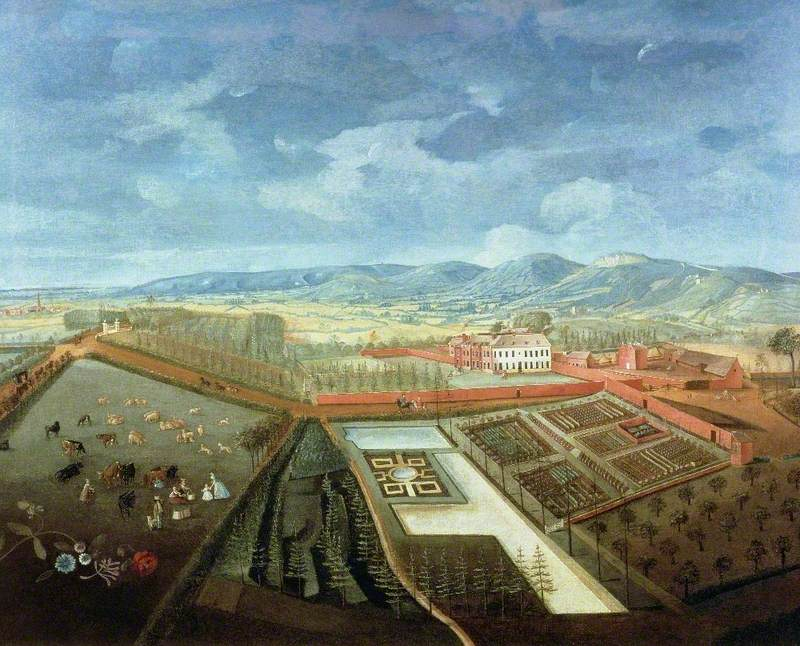
Thomas Robins, Panoramic View of Charlton Park, Cheltenham, Gloucestershire. Oil on canvas, c. 1748. Cheltenham Art Gallery & Museum.

Thomas Robins the Elder (1715/16–1770) was an English artist known for his depictions of English country houses and their gardens. His work has particular historical value as he documented many Rococo gardens that have since disappeared.

In 1748, Robins painted the Rococo garden at Painswick House that had been created by Benjamin Hyett II. Hugh Hammersley's rococo gardens at Woodside in Berkshire were captured in three paintings by Robins.

His son, Thomas Robins the Younger (1748–1806), followed his father in his style of work.
