= Benjamin Hyett =

British estate owner

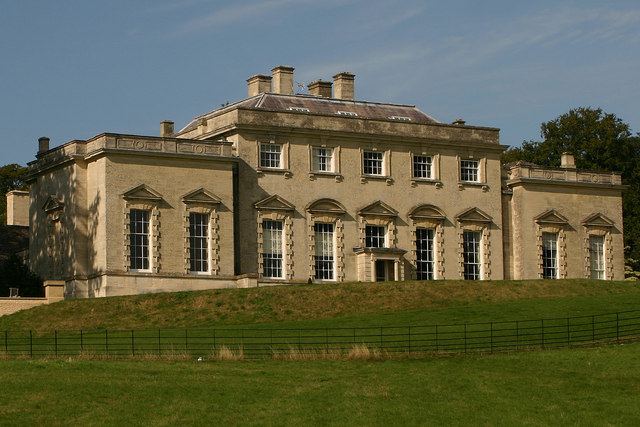
Painswick House

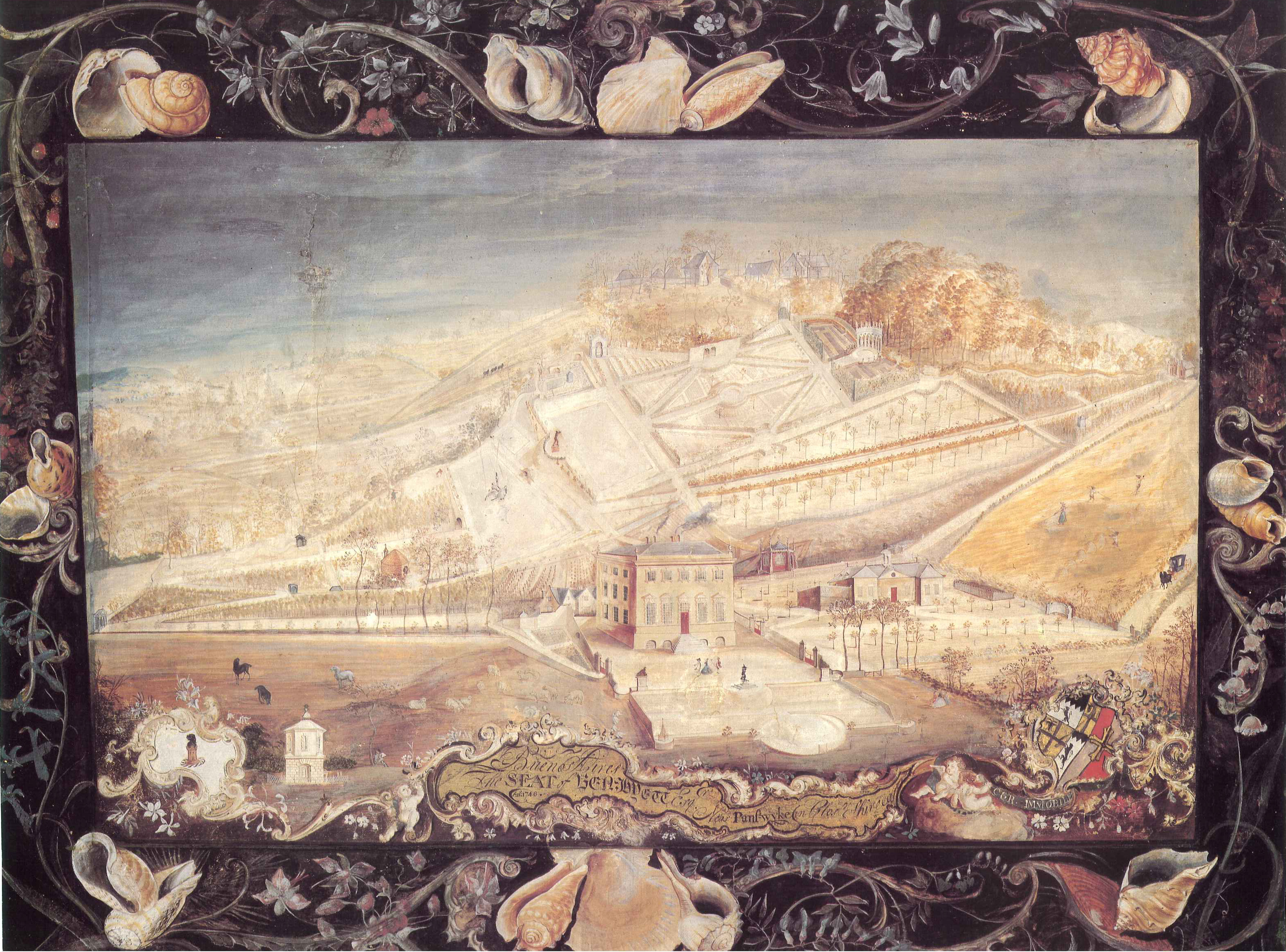
Painswick Rococo Garden, Thomas Robins the Elder, 1748.

Benjamin Hyett (1708–1762) of Painswick House, Gloucestershire, was an eighteenth-century garden creator.

== Life ==
He was born 17 December 1708, the eldest son of Charles Hyett (d. 1738), a leading citizen of Gloucester. He was educated at Pembroke College, Oxford and the Inner Temple, becoming a barrister in 1731. In 1733 his father bought an estate in Painswick and built a house as a country residence. In 1741 he unsuccessfully stood as MP for Gloucester in the Tory interest. Shortly after he married Frances (d. 1768), the only child of Sir Thomas Snell, a London merchant who had settled in Upton St Leonards. He died without any surviving children in 1762 and his estate passed to his brother Nicholas.

== Gardens ==
By 1740 Hyett had created a Rococo garden at Marybone House, Gloucester, incorporating an eclectic range of features and buildings including a pagoda in approximately 6 acres.

A few years later he created a slightly larger garden at his Painswick house, known then as Buenos Aires. It incorporated a statue of Pan by Jan van Nost, which presided over the garden. The main features of the garden were preserved into the 20th century and have now been preserved and opened to the public as the Painswick Rococo Garden.

Visual records of both gardens when newly created were preserved in paintings by Thomas Robins the Elder.
