= Thomas Robins the Younger =

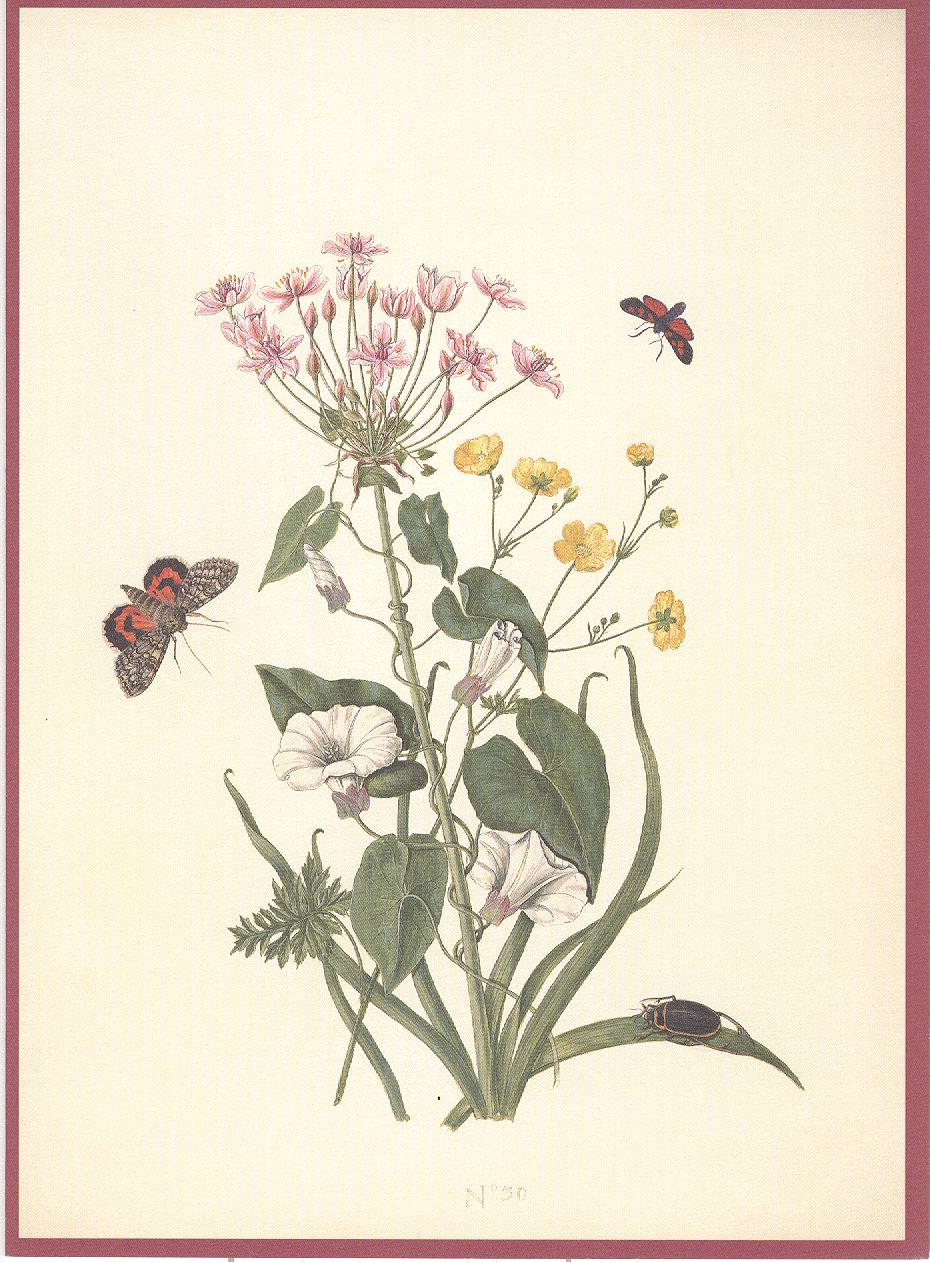
Thomas Robins the Younger. Exotic plants and insects No. 30. Painted in England or Jamaica between 1783 and 1788.

Thomas Robins the Younger (1748–1806) was an English artist known for his depictions of English country houses, their gardens, and the natural world. His father, also Thomas Robins, was noted for his paintings of Gloucestershire gardens.
