= Painswick =

Town in Gloucestershire, England

Coordinates: 51.786°N 2.194°W

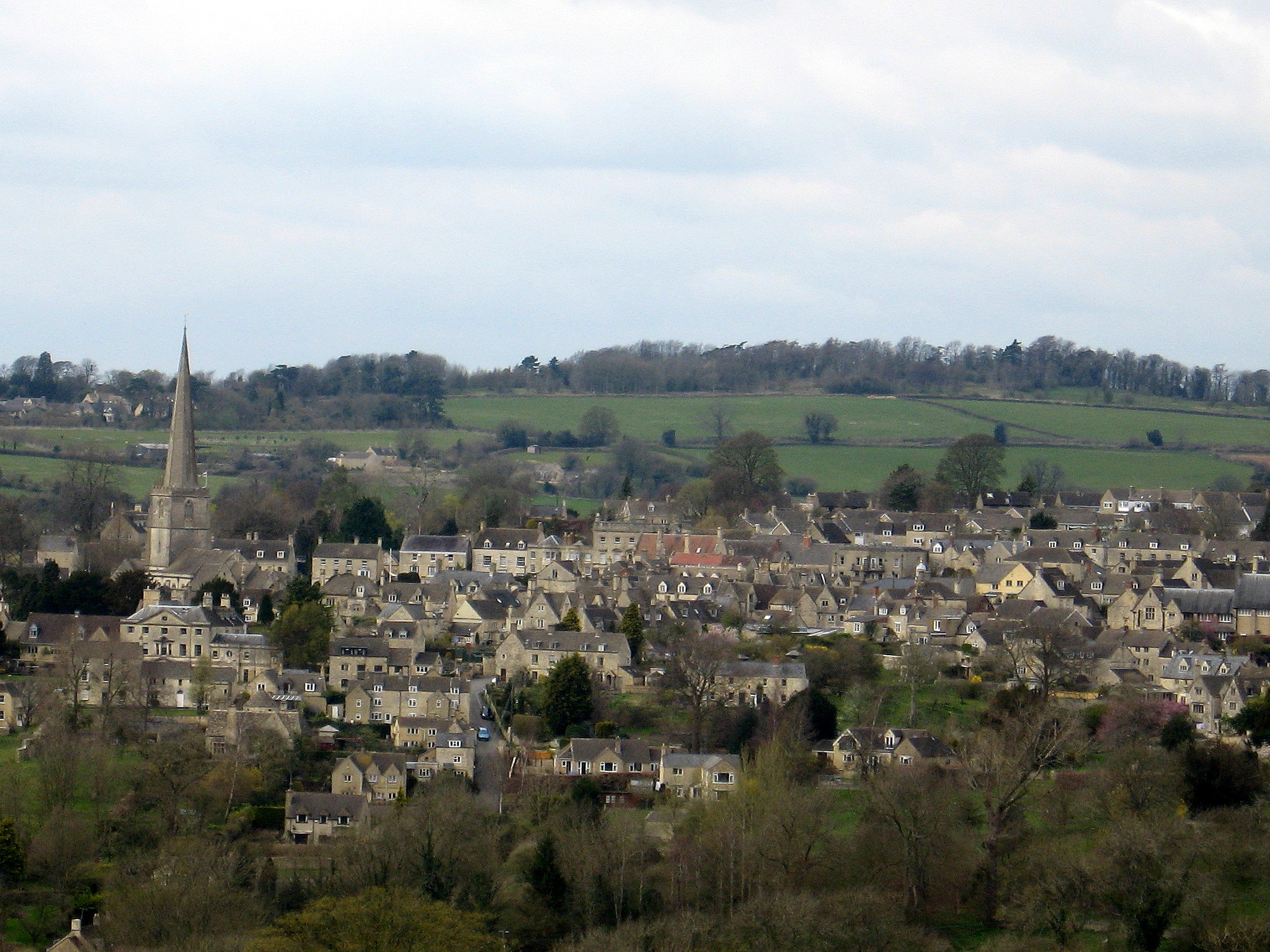
- Painswick from Longridge

- Location within Gloucestershire
- Population: 3,026
- OS grid reference: SO866098
- Civil parish: Painswick
- District: Stroud
- Shire county: Gloucestershire
- Region: South West
- Country: England
- Sovereign state: United Kingdom
- Post town: Stroud
- Postcode district: GL6
- Dialling code: 01452
- Police: Gloucestershire
- Fire: Gloucestershire
- Ambulance: South Western
- UK Parliament: North Cotswolds

Painswick is a town and civil parish in the Stroud District in Gloucestershire, England. Originally the town grew from the wool trade, but it is now best known for its parish church's yew trees and the local Painswick Rococo Garden. The village is mainly constructed of locally quarried Cotswold stone. Many of the buildings feature south-facing attic rooms once used as weavers' workshops.

Painswick stands on a hill overlooking one of the Five Valleys, on the B4073 route between Stroud, 4 miles (6.5 km) to the south, and the city of Gloucester, 7.5 miles (12 km) to the north. It has narrow streets and traditional architecture.

It has a cricket and rugby team and there is a golf course on the outskirts of the town. Painswick Beacon is in the nearby hills.

Painswick won the title "Gloucestershire Village of the Year" in 2025.

== History ==
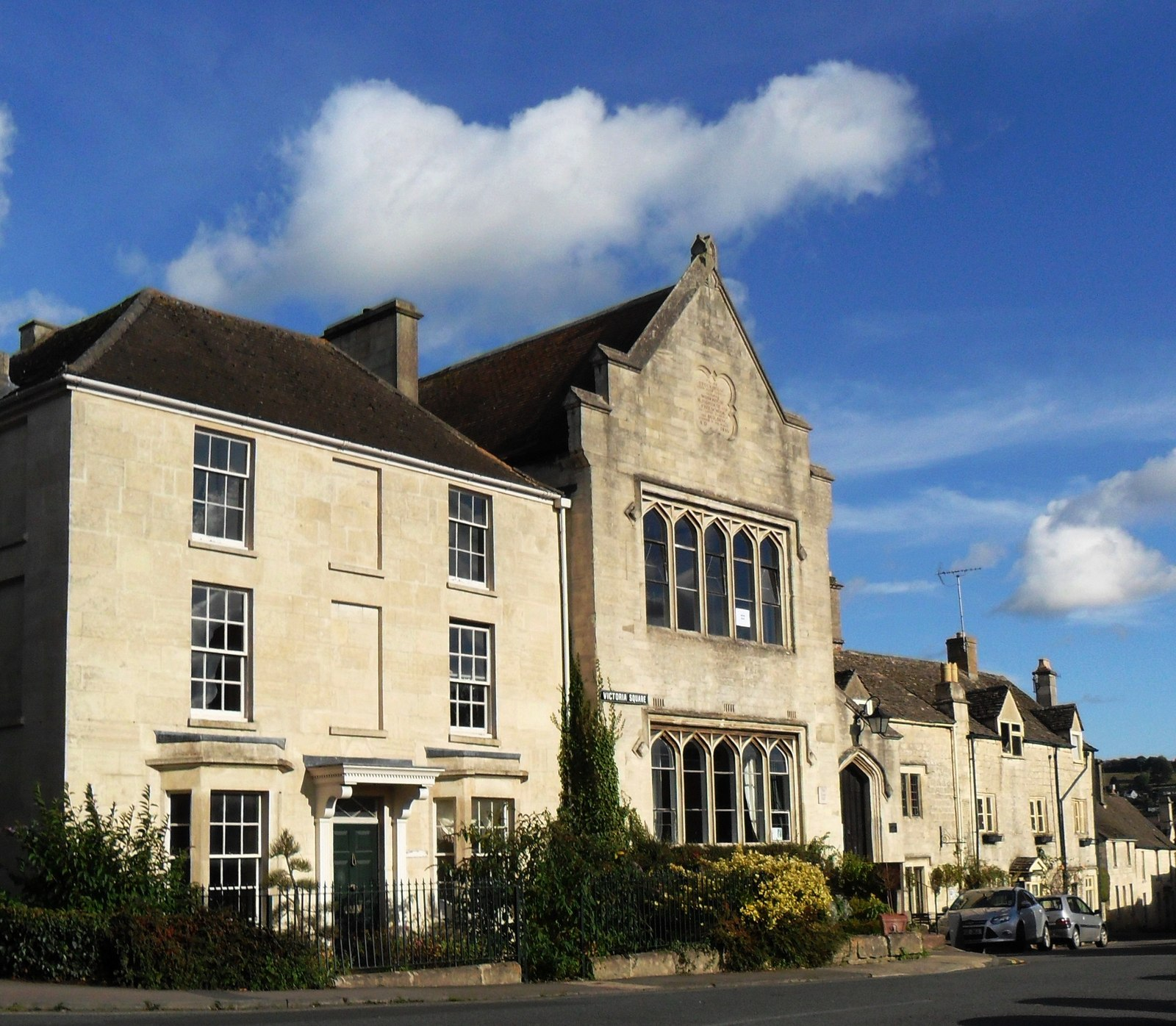
Painswick Town Hall (the building projected forward in the centre of the picture)

There is evidence of settlement in the area as long ago as the Iron Age. This can be seen in Kimsbury hill fort, a defensive earthwork on nearby Painswick Beacon, which has wide views across the Severn Vale. A Roman villa was built just to the north of the present village, dated by Welbore St Clair Baddeley to the late second century. The local monastery, Prinknash Abbey, was established in the 11th century. Painswick itself first appears in historical records in the Domesday Book of 1086, as Wiche, 'dairy-farm'. It continues to appear by this name into the 13th century. The form Painswik first appears in 1237, but must originate in the name of an earlier lord of the manor, Pain Fitzjohn (d. 1137). Pain was a common Anglo-Norman name (itself originating in paiën, Latin paganus, 'heathen').

During the first English Civil War (1642–45) Gloucester was a Parliamentarian stronghold of some strategic importance, but it was surrounded by forces loyal to King Charles I. After the siege of Gloucester was broken on 5 September 1643, the Royalist army, which had been surrounding the city, encamped overnight at Painswick, with the king staying at Court House. Some damage was caused by the troops and a scar from two small cannonballs can still be seen on the tower of St. Mary's parish church.

Painswick House dates from the 1730s and is the home of Baron Dickinson. Its Rococo Garden was laid out in the 1740s by Benjamin Hyett.

Gyde House, a prominent Edwardian Cotswold stone building overlooking the town, was formerly a children's home called "Gyde Orphanage" or "Gyde Home". The building started in 1913 with money bequeathed by a local man, Edwin Francis Gyde (1812 - 1894). The orphanage was designed by Percy Richard Morley Horder, and opened in 1919 to accommodate up to 70 children from ages 5 to 12. The home ran into financial difficulties in the 1930s and was taken over by the National Children's Home charity (NCH). In 1987, Gyde House was offered for free to Coral Atkins, an English actress, for supporting children who had experienced severe abuse. The home closed in 1997 and was subsequently converted into apartments.

== Government ==
For the purposes of local government, the civil parish of Painswick includes the neighbouring villages of Edge, Paradise, Sheepscombe and Slad. The civil parish forms part of the district of Stroud and the county of Gloucestershire. An electoral ward in the same name exists. This stretches beyond the confines of the civil parish. The total ward population taken at the 2011 Census was 4,158. Painswick Parish Council is based at Painswick Town Hall.

For parliamentary purposes, Painswick is within the UK constituency of Stroud. Prior to Brexit in 2020, it was in the European constituency of South West England.

== Parish church ==
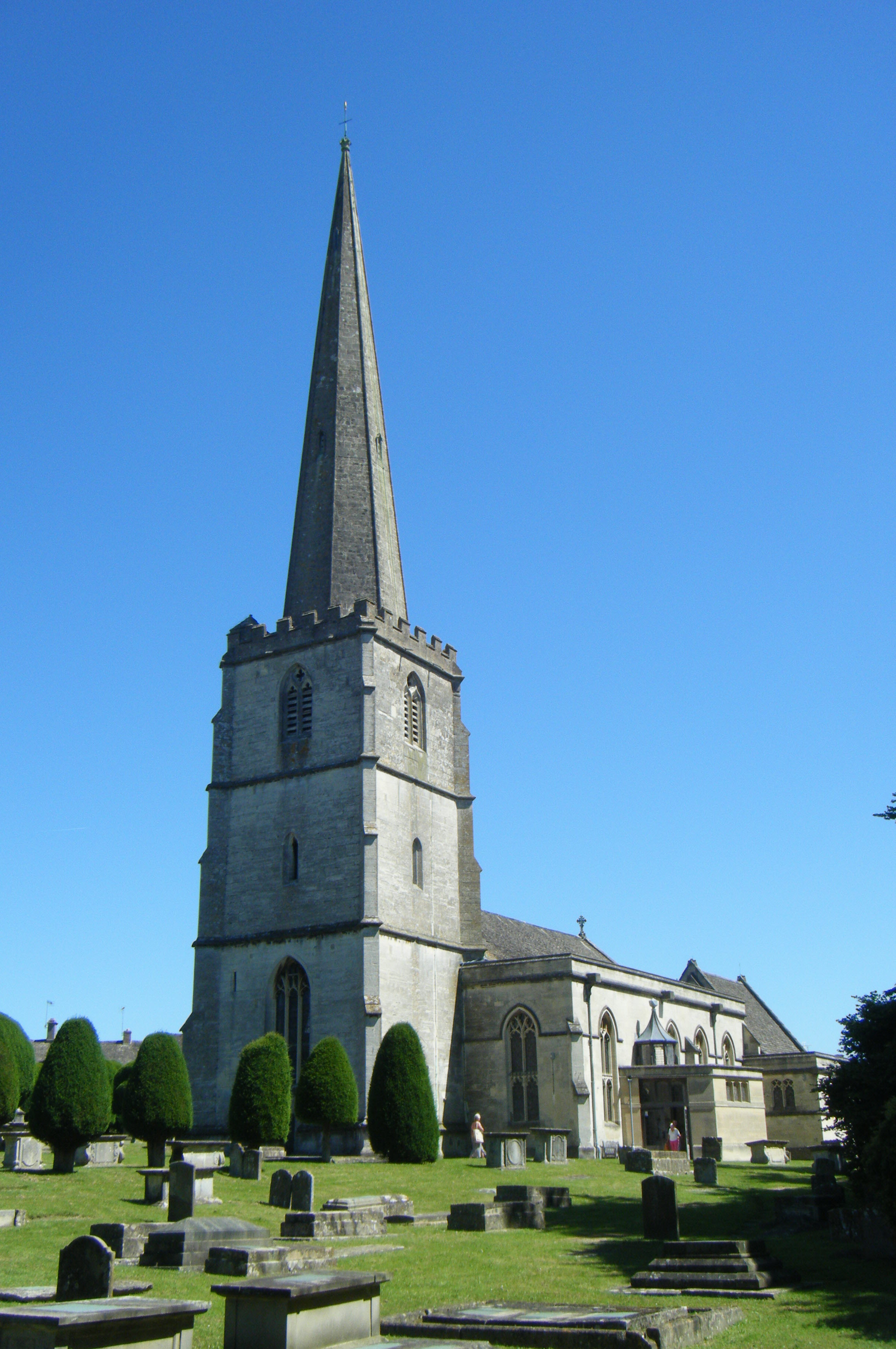
The Church of England parish church of Saint Mary is a Grade I listed building.

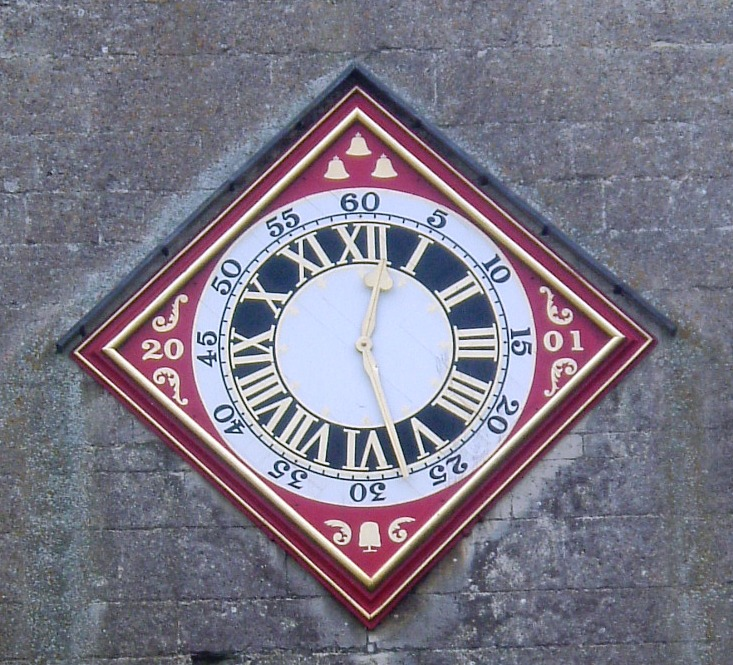
The restored clock-face on the tower of St.Mary's

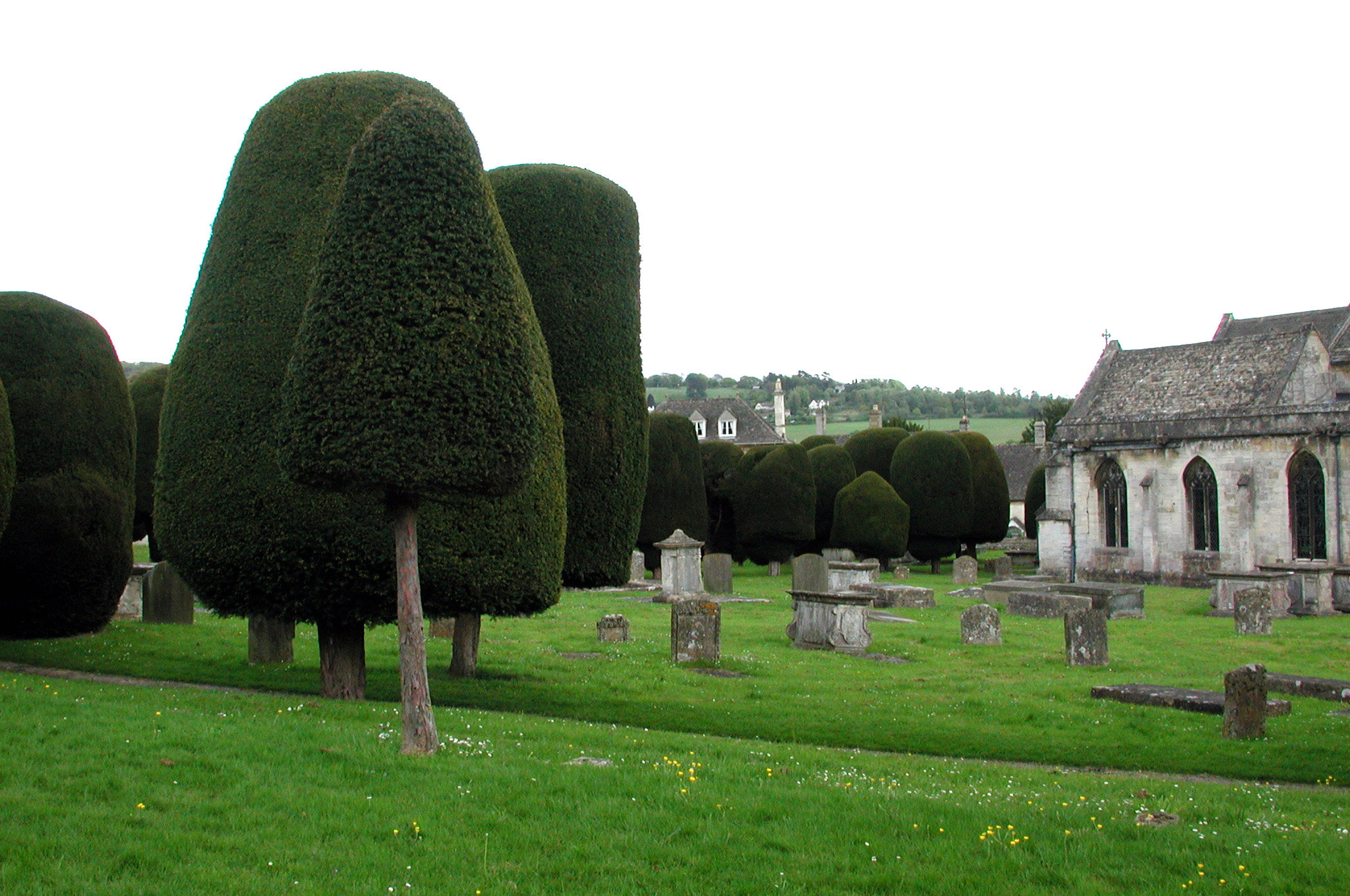
The St Mary's Parish churchyard is notable for its ancient and numerous yew trees.

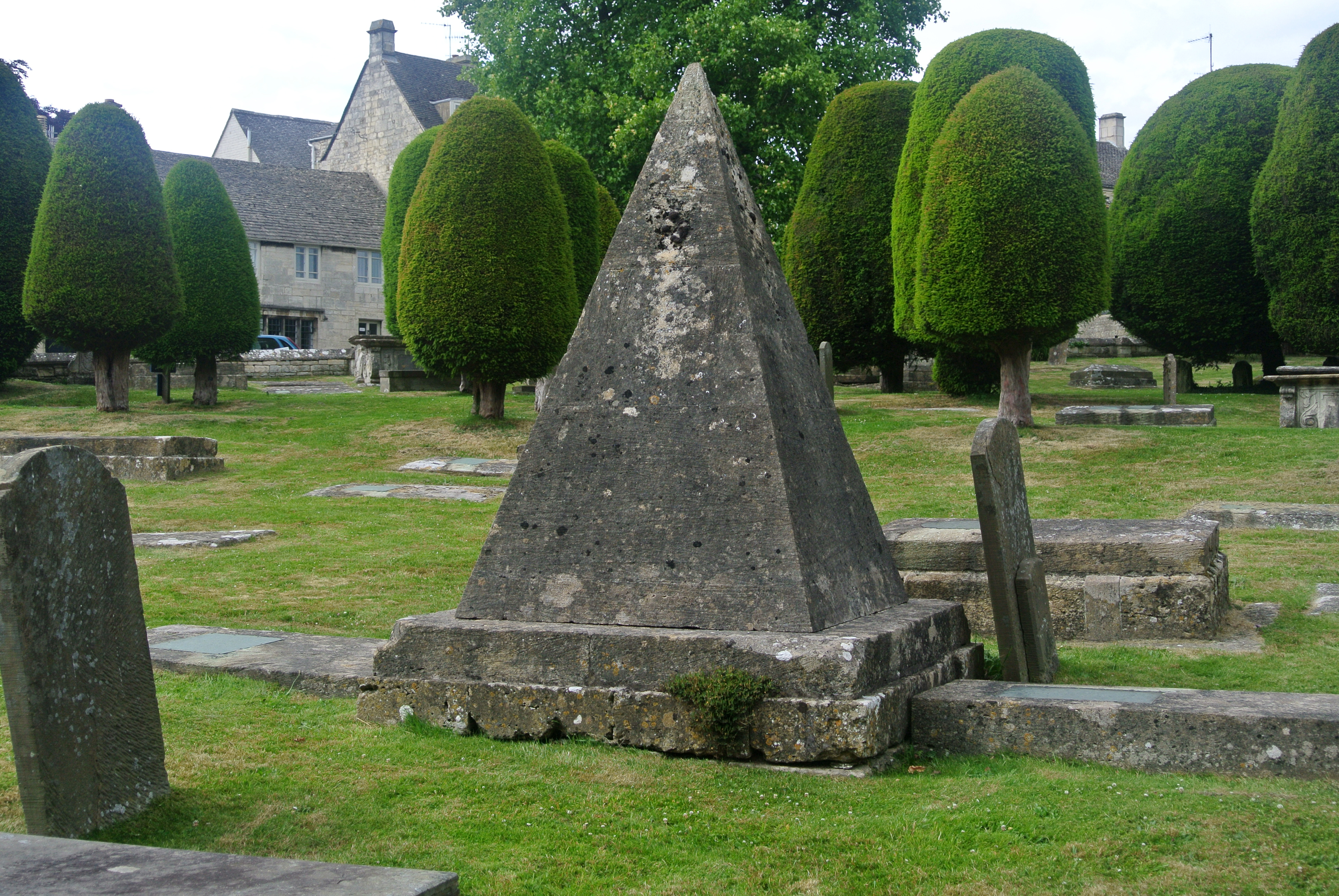
Pyramidal tomb of the stonemason John Bryan.

The present church dates from about 1377 when the St Peters Chapel was built. The north aisle and the chancel were erected between 1377 and 1401, and the tower in 1430. The building of the nave began in 1480, and the sanctuary and present high altar in 1546. The original spire was erected in 1632, and has been rebuilt since. The south aisle was added in 1741. The 53m high spire was added in 1632.

== Local traditions ==
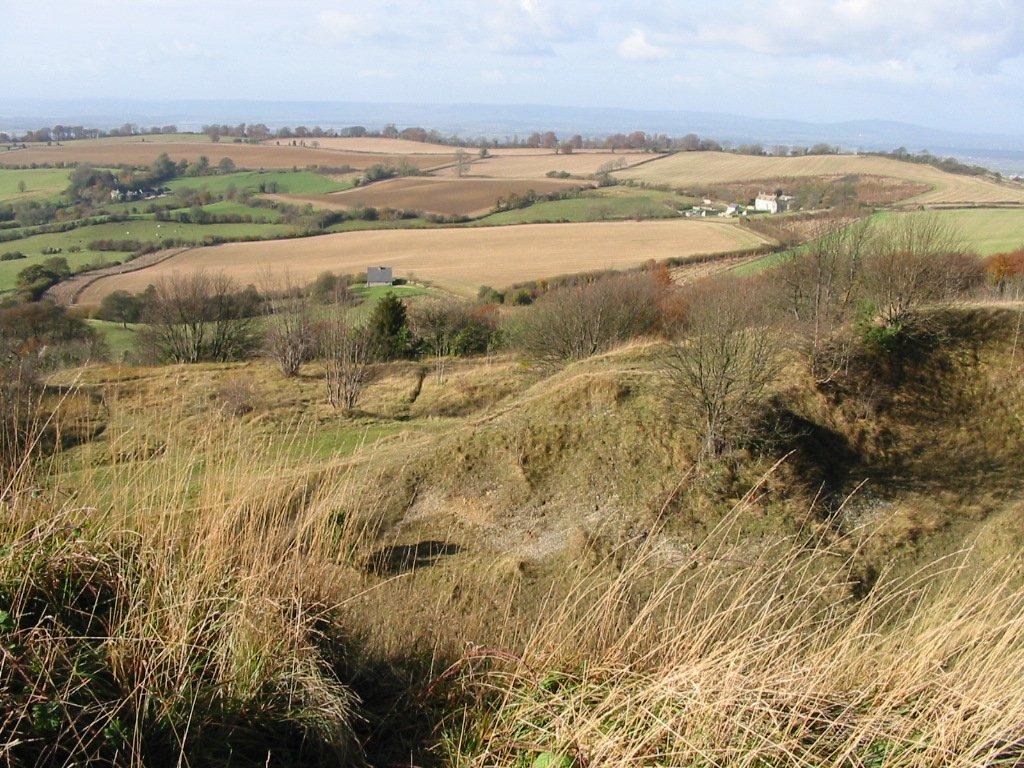
Painswick Beacon, and part of the view from it. The Severn Vale can be seen in the background.

On the first Sunday after 19 September, there has been an annual festival called "Feast Sunday". Three customs were historically followed: feasting, drinking and disorderly conduct; clipping the church; and eating "dog pie". The ceremony known as "clipping the church" involves mostly children, but also adults, who join hands, dance around and "embrace" St. Mary's parish church. Clipping the church and eating dog pie are customs that have been revived and continue to be practised. The "dog pie" is not made of dog meat, but the custom is based upon plum pie baked with a porcelain china dog, that had been baked annually between 1870 and 1880.

Folklore holds that the churchyard will never have more than 99 yew trees and that should a 100th grow the Devil would pull it out. According to the Victoria and Albert Museum a count of the trees showed there to be 103. The plan of the churchyard included in the church's own public leaflet shows 100.

While Royalists were encamped in Painswick, tradition has it that King Charles I went up to the Beacon and, seeing the beautiful valley to the east said "This must be Paradise". Since then that valley, and the hamlet on its western side to the north of Painswick have been called Paradise.

During the 18th century a group of gentry, led by Benjamin Hyett II, organised an annual procession dedicated to Pan, during which a statue of the deity was held aloft, and people shouted "Highgates! Highgates!". The tradition died out in the 1830s, but was revived in 1885 by the new vicar, W. H. Seddon, who mistakenly believed that the festival had been ancient in origin. Seddon's successor, however, was less appreciative of the pagan festival and put an end to it in 1950, when he had Pan's statue buried, although it was later dug up and placed within the grounds of Painswick House.

According to William Black's 'The Land that Thyme Forgot', Bow Wow Sauce, a sauce to be served with roast meats, was developed in Painswick.

== Post office ==
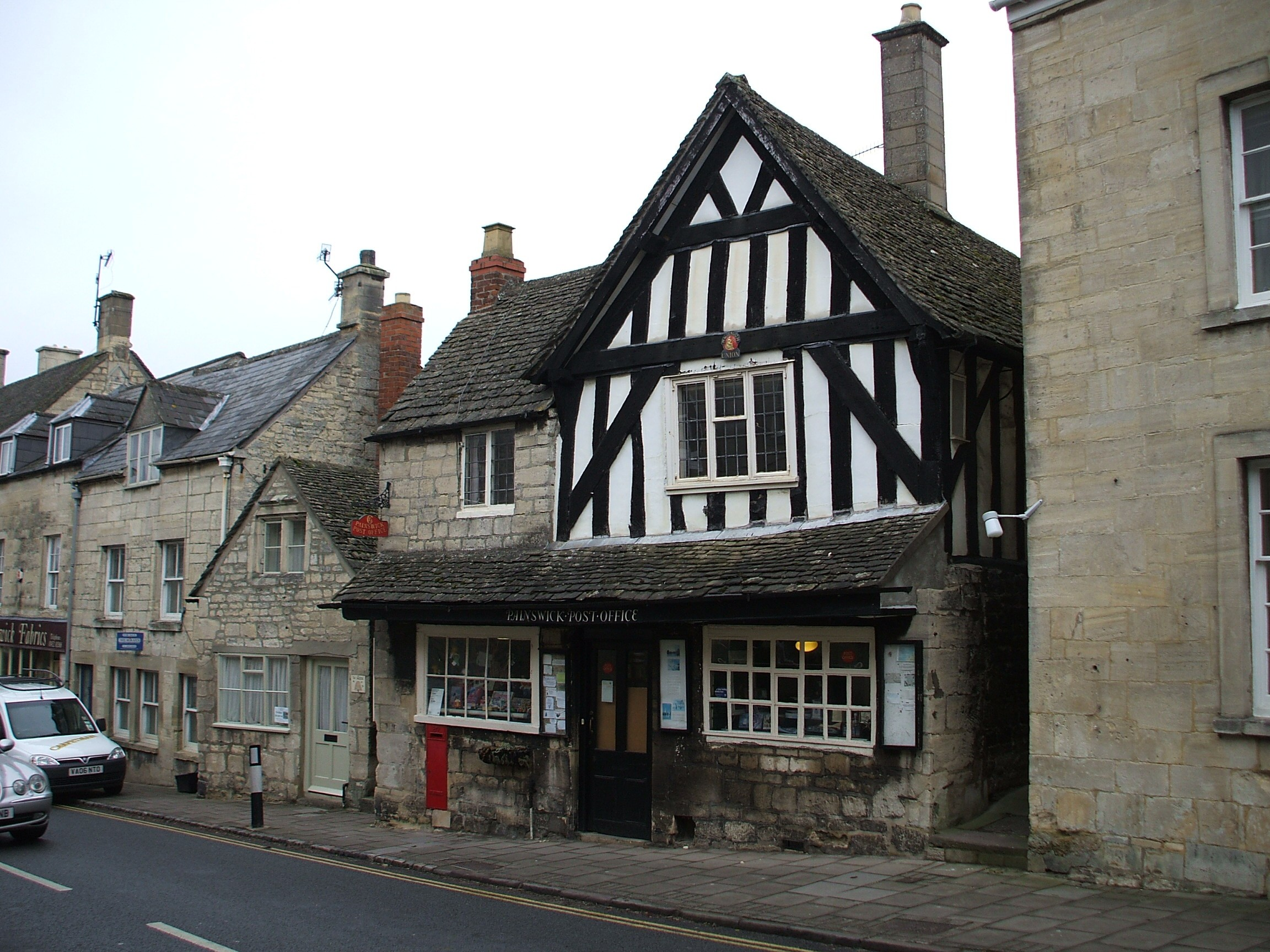
The half-timbered building that contained the old Painswick post office was built in 1478.

The post office in Painswick occupied a listed building built in 1478, making it the oldest known building in Great Britain to also contain a post office. It is not known when the post office counter was opened. Mr. H M Strange moved the post office up the street (by four buildings) in 1933 and remained Post Master there until retirement in 1968. The post office was closed in 2013 and moved to the town hall.

== School ==
Painswick has one school, Croft Primary School. The school is a small secular and co-educational Community School for children aged 4 to 11 with fewer than 150 pupils. In the Key Stage 2 results for 2008 91% of children achieved or exceeded Level 4 in English and Science and 84% did so in Maths. These results are slightly higher than the county averages of 86%, 82% and 91% in English, Maths and Science respectively.

== Notable people ==
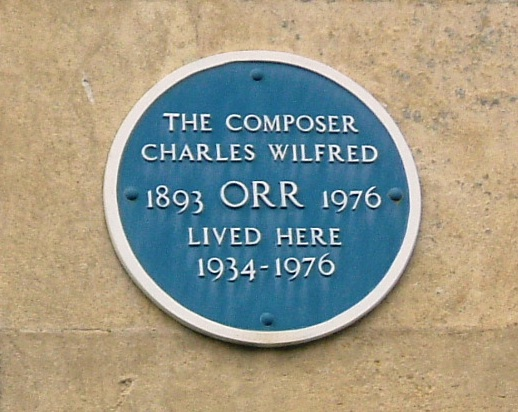
Plaque commemorating the home of Charles Wilfred Orr on St. Mary's Street

- The first Baron Dickinson lived in Painswick. His son, the second Baron, runs the Painswick Rococo Garden, designed by Benjamin Hyett II in the 1740s.
- Gerald Finzi, composer, lived in Painswick from 1922–26 at a house called "Kingsmill".
- Susan Lynch, Irish actress, moved to live in Painswick in 2008 with her husband, actor Craig Parkinson.
- Charles Wilfred Orr, composer, lived in Painswick from 1934–76.
- Madame Restell (Ann Trow Lohman), notorious New York City midwife and abortion provider, was born in Painswick in 1812.
- Julian Slade, composer of the 1954 hit musical Salad Days, moved to Painswick as a child, had a lifelong association with the village and was honorary President of Painswick Players.
- Thomas Twining, tea merchant, was born in Painswick in 1675, and in 1706 set up his first tea shop at 216 Strand, London, later to become home of the famous Twinings brand.
- Robert Watkin-Mills, the bass-baritone, was born in Painswick.
