= Tom Robbins (journalist) =

American journalist (1949–2025)

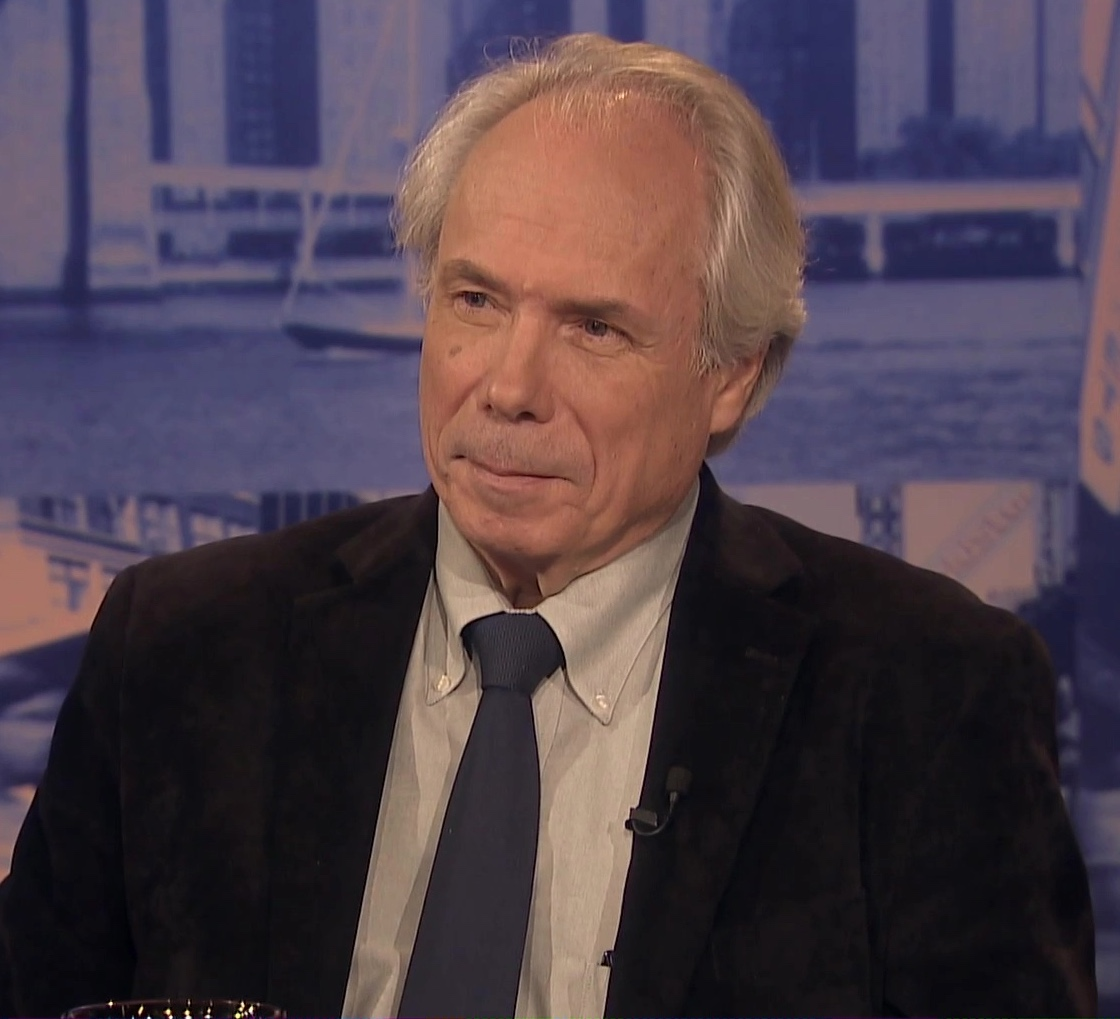
- Robbins on CUNY TV's City Talk, 2013
- Born: April 10, 1949; New York City, U.S.
- Died: May 27, 2025 (aged 76)
- Occupation: Investigative journalist

Tom Robbins (April 10, 1949 – May 27, 2025) was an American journalist known for his reporting on New York City's criminal justice system and restorative justice. He served as the Investigative Journalist in Residence at the Craig Newmark Graduate School of Journalism at the City University of New York (CUNY). In March 2023, Robbins became a senior investigative reporter for The City, a nonprofit digital news platform devoted to hard-hitting coverage of New York City. Robbins was a finalist for the Pulitzer Prize for Investigative Reporting in 2016.

== Early life and education ==
Robbins was born in New York City to author and Pulitzer Prize finalist Jhan Robbins and June Stumpe. He was raised in the suburbs of New York City. Robbins graduated from the Putney School in Vermont in 1967 and moved to New York City in 1968.

== Career ==
Robbins began as a housing organizer in New York’s Lower East Side during the 1970s before transitioning to journalism. He worked for local newspapers in Brooklyn, North Brooklyn, and Brighton Beach before becoming editor of City Limits magazine from 1980 to 1985. He then joined The Village Voice, where he worked from 1985 to 1988. Robbins also contributed to the New York Observer during this time. In 1988, he and Jack Newfield left The Village Voice to join the New York Daily News. Robbins returned to The Village Voice in 2000 but resigned in protest in 2011 after the dismissal of fellow journalist Wayne Barrett.

He was a Revson Fellow for New York City in 1985 and served as the Jack Newfield Visiting Professor at Hunter College in 2007, where he taught investigative journalism. From 2011 onward, Robbins held the position of investigative journalist in residence at the Craig Newmark Graduate School of Journalism at CUNY.

In 2013, Robbins co-authored the book Mob Boss: The Life of Little Al D’Arco, the Man Who Brought Down the Mafia, based on interviews with former Lucchese crime family leader Alfonso “Little Al” D’Arco.

His investigative series “Cellblock Violence,” co-written with Michael Winerip and Michael Schwirtz, was a 2016 finalist for the Pulitzer Prize for Investigative Reporting and won the 2016 Hillman Prize for Newspaper Journalism.

In 2023, Robbins joined the newly launched investigations unit at The City as a senior investigative reporter.

== Awards and honors ==
- Pulitzer Prize Finalist for Investigative Reporting (2016)
- Hillman Prize for Newspaper Journalism (2016)

== Personal life ==
Robbins lived in New York City from 1968 until his death and resided in Brooklyn. He was married to artist Susan Mastrangelo. Robbins had one son, Maro Robbins, a post-conviction public defender.

== Notable articles ==
- "New York’s Ten Worst Landlords of 1987." The Village Voice, August 18, 1987.
- "Eat the Rich." The Village Voice, February 2, 2011.
- "NYPD Cops' Training Included an Anti-Muslim Horror Flick." The Village Voice, January 19, 2011.
- "The Downtown Mosque Plan Riles the Loons." The Village Voice, July 20, 2010.
- "Secrets of the Mob." The Village Voice, May 8, 2007.
- "Obama Time." The Village Voice, August 21, 2007.
- "Wayne Barrett: A Brilliant New York Beacon and Political Warrior for Justice." The Village Voice, January 20, 2017.
- "The Day Housing Activists Invaded Donald Trump's Taxpayer-Funded Palace." City Limits, May 4, 2016.
- "Trump and the Mob." The Marshall Project, April 27, 2016.
- "Inmates Say They Paid a Bloody Price for a Guard’s Injury." The Marshall Project, November 15, 2016.
- "Revisiting the Ghosts of Attica." The Marshall Project, September 9, 2016.
- "Why Is Karl Taylor Dead?" The Marshall Project, November 27, 2018.
- "What Happened to Rudy Giuliani?" TIME, October 2019.
- "Judith Clark’s Radical Transformation." The New York Times Magazine, January 15, 2012.
- "Joseph Gordon, Who Spent 40 Years in Prison, Is Granted Parole." The New York Times, December 2, 2021.
