= Ralph Wallis =

Ralph Wallis (died 1669), was a nonconformist pamphleteer, known as ‘the Cobler of Gloucester.’

Wallis was, according to the minutes of the Gloucester corporation, admitted on 8 June 1648 ‘to keepe an English schoole at Trinity church’ (since demolished). On 5 August 1651, the corporation paid the charges of his journey ‘to London about the city business.’ On 24 September 1658 he was made a burgess and freeman of the city on the ground of his ‘many services.’ At the Restoration he appears as a pamphleteer of the Mar-Prelate type, attacking with rude jocular virulence the teaching and character of the conforming clergy. Adopting the sobriquet ‘Sil Awl’ (an anagram on Wallis), he called himself ‘the Cobler of Gloucester,’ and his pamphlets take the form of dialogues between ‘the Cobler’ and his wife. His earliest pamphlets appear to have borne the titles ‘Magna Charta’ and ‘Good News from Rome.’

On 18 January 1664 he is reported as ‘lurking in London,’ under the alias of Gardiner; he lodged in the house of Thomas Rawson, journeyman shoemaker, in Little Britain, and employed himself in dispersing his pamphlets. Money for printing them was collected by James Forbes (1629?–1712), the independent. Correspondence between Wallis and his wife Elizabeth was intercepted. Two warrants (12 May and 20 June) were issued for his apprehension. In September his house at Gloucester and the houses of Toby Jordan, bookseller at Gloucester, and others, were searched for seditious books. On 28 September (Sir) Roger L'Estrange wrote to Henry Bennet (afterwards Earl of Arlington) that he had Wallis in custody. On 1 October Rawson, Wallis, and Forbes were examined by the Privy Council.

Wallis admitted his authorship, and declared himself to be in religion ‘a Christian.’ He obtained his release, Sir Richard Browne being his bail. In a petition to Arlington, Wallis affirmed that he ‘only touched the priests that they may learn better manners, and will scribble as much against fanatics, when the worm gets into his cracked pate, as it did when he wrote those books.’ In April 1665 he was examined before the Privy Council for a new pamphlet, ‘Magna Charta, or More News from Rome’ (the British Museum has a copy with title ‘Or Magna Charta; More News from Rome,’ 1666, 4to). On 15 April 1665 William Nicholson (1591–1672), bishop of Gloucester, wrote to Sheldon that, ‘though much favour had been shown him’ (he had specially attacked Nicholson), ‘he sells the books publicly in the town and elsewhere, and glories in them.’ In his last known pamphlet, ‘Room for the Cobler of Gloucester’ (1668, 4to), which L'Estrange calls (24 April 1668) ‘the damnedest thing has come out yet,’ he tells a story which is commonly regarded as the property of Maria Edgeworth, ‘The Lord Bishop is much like that Hog, that, when some Children were eating Milk out of a Dish that stood upon a Stool, thrust his Snowt into the Dish, and drank up all; not regarding the Children, who cryed, “Take a Poon, Pig, take a Poon”’. Wallis's anecdotes, often brutally coarse, are not always without foundation.

He died in 1668–9; the burial register of St. Mary de Crypt, Gloucester, has the entry ‘Randulphus Wallis fanaticæ memoriæ sepult. Feby 9.’ In 1670 appeared a tract entitled ‘The Life and Death of Ralph Wallis, the Cobler of Gloucester, together with some inquiry into the Mystery of Conventicleism;’ it gives, however, no biographical particulars. A later tract, ‘The Cobler of Gloucester Revived’ (1704), 4to, contains nothing about Wallis.
