= Tommy Robison =

American football player (born 1961)

No. 77, 66
- Position: Linebacker

Personal information
- Born: November 17, 1961 (age 64); Merkel, Texas, U.S.
- Listed height: 6 ft 4 in (1.93 m)
- Listed weight: 290 lb (132 kg)

Career information
- High school: Gregory-Portland (Texas)
- College: Texas A&M
- Supplemental draft: 1984: 2nd round, 50th overall pick

Career history
- Houston Gamblers (1984-1985); Green Bay Packers (1987–1988); Atlanta Falcons (1989); Houston Oilers (1990)*
- * Offseason or practice squad member only

Career NFL statistics
- Games played: 12
- Stats at Pro Football Reference

Tommy Levell Robison Jr. is an American former professional football player who was a linebacker in the National Football League (NFL). He played college football for the Texas A&M Aggies.

== Biography ==
Tommy Levell Robison Jr. was born on November 17, 1961, in Merkel, Texas.

== Professional career ==
Robison was selected by the Cleveland Browns from the Houston Gamblers in the second round of the 1984 NFL Supplemental Draft of USFL and CFL players. He would go on to play for the Green Bay Packers during the 1987 NFL season and the Atlanta Falcons during the 1989 NFL season.

He played at the collegiate level at Texas A&M University.
