= Listed buildings in Gloucester =

Buildings in Stow-on-the-Wold, Gloucestershire, England

Gloucester is a city and non-civil parish in Gloucestershire, England. It contains 445 listed buildings that are recorded in the National Heritage List for England. Of these 35 are grade I, 49 are grade II* and 361 are grade II.

This list is based on the information retrieved online from Historic England.

== Key ==
Grade	Criteria
I	Buildings that are of exceptional interest
II*	Particularly important buildings of more than special interest
II	Buildings that are of special interest

== Listing ==
Name	Grade	Location	Type	Completed (Note: The date given is the date used by Historic England as significant for the initial building or that of an important part in the structure's description.)	Date designated	Grid ref. (Note: The grid reference is based on the British national grid reference system, sometimes known as OSGB36, used by the Ordnance Survey.) Geo-coordinates	Notes	Entry number (Note: The "List Entry Number" is a unique number assigned to each listed building and scheduled monument by Historic England.)	Image	Wikidata
Barnwood Court	II	29 and 29a, Barnwood Avenue, Barnwood			10 January 1955	SO8573117759; 51°51′30″N 2°12′31″W		1271563	Upload Photo	Q26561505
Group of 3 Pinnacles in Garden to North of Barnwood Court	II	Barnwood Avenue, Barnwood			15 December 1998	SO8574217780; 51°51′30″N 2°12′30″W		1271564	Upload Photo	Q26561506
Old Rectory	II	16, Barnwood Road			12 March 1973	SO8495018633; 51°51′58″N 2°13′12″W		1271565	Upload Photo	Q26561507
The Old House	II	30, Barnwood Road			9 February 1998	SO8503118609; 51°51′57″N 2°13′08″W		1271566	Upload Photo	Q26561508
181 and 183, Barnwood Road	II	181 and 183, Barnwood Road, Barnwood			15 December 1998	SO8600818111; 51°51′41″N 2°12′17″W		1271567	Upload Photo	Q26561509
Manor Day Centre	II	Barnwood Road, Barnwood			10 January 1955	SO8636817862; 51°51′33″N 2°11′58″W		1271568	Upload Photo	Q26561510
Gothic Cottages	II	7 and 8, Barton Street			12 March 1973	SO8383518048; 51°51′39″N 2°14′10″W		1271572	Upload Photo	Q26561514
110 and 112, Barton Street	II	110 and 112, Barton Street			15 December 1998	SO8369418091; 51°51′40″N 2°14′17″W		1271569	Upload Photo	Q26561511
The Olympus Theatre	II	162, Barton Street			9 October 2000	SO8384017962; 51°51′36″N 2°14′10″W		1389103	Upload Photo	Q31679343
The Vauxhall Inn	II	174, Barton Street			12 March 1973	SO8387817946; 51°51′36″N 2°14′08″W		1271570	Upload Photo	Q26561512
Church of All Saints	II	Barton Street			4 November 1981	SO8369218137; 51°51′42″N 2°14′18″W		1271571	Upload Photo	Q26561513
Crown Courts	II	Bearland	courthouse		23 January 1952	SO8294718641; 51°51′58″N 2°14′57″W		1271573	Crown Courts More images	Q26561515
59 and 61, Westgate Street	II*	1 and 3, Berkeley Street	building		23 January 1952	SO8301918662; 51°51′59″N 2°14′53″W		1245225	59 and 61, Westgate Street More images	Q17537564
16, Berkeley Street	II	16, Berkeley Street			23 January 1952	SO8298218640; 51°51′58″N 2°14′55″W		1271574	Upload Photo	Q26561516
Langham House	II	18, Berkeley Street			23 January 1952	SO8297418631; 51°51′58″N 2°14′55″W		1271575	Upload Photo	Q26561517
20, Berkeley Street	II	20, Berkeley Street			23 January 1952	SO8296818623; 51°51′57″N 2°14′56″W		1245988	Upload Photo	Q26538443
Blackfriars Church and Part of East Range of Friary	I	Blackfriars			23 January 1952	SO8297518427; 51°51′51″N 2°14′55″W		1245989	Upload Photo	Q17525931
Boundary Wall to North West Corner of Friary Site, Blackfriars	II*	Blackfriars			12 March 1973	SO8294918461; 51°51′52″N 2°14′56″W		1245990	Upload Photo	Q17537684
North End of West Range, Blackfriars	I	Blackfriars			23 January 1952	SO8294618433; 51°51′51″N 2°14′57″W		1245991	Upload Photo	Q17525932
South Range and Adjoining South End of West Range, Blackfriars	I	Blackfriars			23 January 1952	SO8294118407; 51°51′50″N 2°14′57″W		1245992	Upload Photo	Q67656177
Norfolk Buildings	II	73-91, Bristol Road	terrace of houses		23 January 1952	SO8267217367; 51°51′17″N 2°15′11″W		1245993	Norfolk Buildings More images	Q26538444
Beaufort House	II	Brunswick Road, GL1 1JZ			23 January 1952	SO8307217947; 51°51′35″N 2°14′50″W		1245962	Upload Photo	Q26538420
Ferncroft	II	24, Brunswick Road			12 March 1973	SO8313618185; 51°51′43″N 2°14′47″W		1245994	Upload Photo	Q26538445
Bastion House	II	26, Brunswick Road			12 March 1973	SO8313018168; 51°51′43″N 2°14′47″W		1245995	Upload Photo	Q26538446
28, Brunswick Road	II	28, Brunswick Road			3 November 1998	SO8312018163; 51°51′42″N 2°14′47″W		1245996	Upload Photo	Q26538447
30, Brunswick Road	II	30, Brunswick Road			3 November 1998	SO8312418155; 51°51′42″N 2°14′47″W		1245997	Upload Photo	Q26538448
43 and 45, Brunswick Road	II	43 and 45, Brunswick Road			23 January 1952	SO8312918071; 51°51′39″N 2°14′47″W		1245998	Upload Photo	Q26538449
47 and 49, Brunswick Road	II	47 and 49, Brunswick Road			23 January 1952	SO8312518061; 51°51′39″N 2°14′47″W		1245999	Upload Photo	Q26538450
51, 53 and 55, Brunswick Road	II	51, 53 and 55, Brunswick Road			23 January 1952	SO8311718047; 51°51′39″N 2°14′48″W		1246001	Upload Photo	Q26538452
Christ Church, Boundary Wall and Gate Piers	II	Brunswick Road, GL1 1JZ	church building		23 January 1952	SO8313618024; 51°51′38″N 2°14′47″W		1245963	Christ Church, Boundary Wall and Gate Piers More images	Q26538421
City Museum and Art Gallery	II	Brunswick Road			12 March 1973	SO8325718346; 51°51′48″N 2°14′40″W		1245964	Upload Photo	Q26538422
Public Library	II	Brunswick Road	library		12 March 1973	SO8322218302; 51°51′47″N 2°14′42″W		1245965	Public Library More images	Q26538423
Belsize House and Attached Garden Walls and Railings	II	1, Brunswick Square			12 March 1973	SO8311018094; 51°51′40″N 2°14′48″W		1245966	Upload Photo	Q26538424
2, Brunswick Square	II	2, Brunswick Square			15 December 1998	SO8310118098; 51°51′40″N 2°14′48″W		1245967	Upload Photo	Q26538425
Number 3 and Attached Railings	II	3, Brunswick Square			15 December 1998	SO8307218113; 51°51′41″N 2°14′50″W		1245968	Upload Photo	Q26538426
4 and 5, Brunswick Square	II	4 and 5, Brunswick Square			23 January 1952	SO8306318117; 51°51′41″N 2°14′50″W		1245969	Upload Photo	Q26538427
Numbers 6 and 7 and Attached Railings	II	6 and 7, Brunswick Square			23 January 1952	SO8305118123; 51°51′41″N 2°14′51″W		1245970	Upload Photo	Q26538428
8 and 9, Brunswick Square	II	8 and 9, Brunswick Square			23 January 1952	SO8304018128; 51°51′41″N 2°14′52″W		1245971	Upload Photo	Q26538429
10, Brunswick Square	II	10, Brunswick Square			23 January 1952	SO8303218132; 51°51′41″N 2°14′52″W		1245972	Upload Photo	Q26538430
11, Brunswick Square	II	11, Brunswick Square			23 January 1952	SO8302718134; 51°51′42″N 2°14′52″W		1245973	Upload Photo	Q26538431
12-18, Brunswick Square	II	12-18, Brunswick Square	building		23 January 1952	SO8299618105; 51°51′41″N 2°14′54″W		1245974	12-18, Brunswick Square More images	Q26538432
20-25, Brunswick Square	II	20-25, Brunswick Square			23 January 1952	SO8299518056; 51°51′39″N 2°14′54″W		1245948	Upload Photo	Q26538413
26 and 27, Brunswick Square	II	26 and 27, Brunswick Square			23 January 1952	SO8301718044; 51°51′39″N 2°14′53″W		1245949	Upload Photo	Q26538414
28, Brunswick Square	II	28, Brunswick Square			15 December 1998	SO8302518039; 51°51′38″N 2°14′52″W		1245950	Upload Photo	Q26538415
Number 29 and Attached Balustrade with Gate and Piers to Forecourt	II	29, Brunswick Square			23 January 1952	SO8306018018; 51°51′38″N 2°14′51″W		1245951	Upload Photo	Q26538416
Cathedral Church of the Holy and Indivisible Trinity	I	Cathedral Precincts	Anglican or Episcopal cathedral		23 January 1952	SO8312118778; 51°52′02″N 2°14′48″W		1245952	Cathedral Church of the Holy and Indivisible Trinity More images	Q262500
Cathedral Chapter House	I	Cathedral Precincts	building		23 January 1952	SO8313518814; 51°52′04″N 2°14′47″W		1245953	Cathedral Chapter House More images	Q17525927
Cathedral Cloister and Lavatorium	I	Cathedral Precincts	cloister		23 January 1952	SO8310418842; 51°52′04″N 2°14′48″W		1245954	Cathedral Cloister and Lavatorium More images	Q17525928
Dulverton House (kings School)	II*	Cathedral Precincts	architectural structure		23 January 1952	SO8317018847; 51°52′05″N 2°14′45″W		1245957	Dulverton House (kings School) More images	Q17537671
Former Coach House to North East of Dulverton House (kings School)	II	Cathedral Precincts			15 December 1998	SO8319618849; 51°52′05″N 2°14′44″W		1245958	Upload Photo	Q26538417
Gazebo in South West Corner of Kings School Garden	II	Cathedral Precincts			15 December 1998	SO8305118927; 51°52′07″N 2°14′51″W		1245959	Upload Photo	Q26538418
Kings School Gymnasium	II	Cathedral Precincts			23 January 1952	SO8313518824; 51°52′04″N 2°14′47″W		1245961	Kings School Gymnasium More images	Q26538419
Kings School House	II	Cathedral Precincts			23 January 1952	SO8317118722; 51°52′01″N 2°14′45″W		1271577	Upload Photo	Q26561519
Kings School and Remains of Abbots Lodging	II*	Cathedral Precincts			12 March 1973	SO8311518902; 51°52′06″N 2°14′48″W		1245960	Upload Photo	Q17537681
Little Cloister	I	Cathedral Precincts	architectural structure		23 January 1952	SO8312918860; 51°52′05″N 2°14′47″W		1271578	Little Cloister More images	Q17525933
Little Cloister House	I	Cathedral Precincts	building		23 January 1952	SO8311118865; 51°52′05″N 2°14′48″W		1271579	Little Cloister House More images	Q17525934
North Precinct Wall	I	Cathedral Precincts			23 January 1952	SO8311218929; 51°52′07″N 2°14′48″W		1271580	Upload Photo	Q17525935
Palace Cottage (the Kings School)	II	Cathedral Precincts			15 December 1998	SO8307918940; 51°52′08″N 2°14′50″W		1271581	Upload Photo	Q26561520
Passage from Cathedral Cloisters to Former Monastic Infirmary	I	Cathedral Precincts			23 January 1952	SO8312618846; 51°52′05″N 2°14′47″W		1271582	Upload Photo	Q67654352
Railings to School Playground on North Side of Gymnasium	II	Cathedral Precincts			15 December 1998	SO8314618861; 51°52′05″N 2°14′46″W		1271576	Upload Photo	Q26561518
Remains of Monastic Infirmary	I	Cathedral Precincts	arcade		23 January 1952	SO8314718865; 51°52′05″N 2°14′46″W		1271583	Remains of Monastic Infirmary More images	Q17525936
Wardle House	II	Cathedral Precincts			23 January 1952	SO8313118727; 51°52′01″N 2°14′47″W		1271584	Upload Photo	Q26561521
Cemetery Chapels	II	Cemetery Road			15 December 1998	SO8425716742; 51°50′57″N 2°13′48″W		1271585	Upload Photo	Q26561522
Gates and Railings to Churchyard to South and South West of Church of St Catherine	II	Cheltenham Road			15 December 1998	SO8444518961; 51°52′08″N 2°13′38″W		1245746	Upload Photo	Q26538242
Church of St Lawrence	II*	Church Lane, Barnwood, GL4 3JB	church building		10 January 1955	SO8584117754; 51°51′29″N 2°12′25″W		1271586	Church of St Lawrence More images	Q17537687
Two Table Tombs Approximately 3 Metres and 6 Metres North of the Tower of the Church of St Lawrence	II	Church Lane, Barnwood			15 December 1998	SO8582917756; 51°51′30″N 2°12′26″W		1271587	Upload Photo	Q26561523
Headstone to Elizabeth Baylis Located Approximately 20 Metres to the East of the Chancel of the Church of St Lawrence	II	Church Lane, Barnwood			16 April 2014	SO8587417753; 51°51′29″N 2°12′23″W		1419345	Upload Photo	Q26676735
Church of the Holy Trinity	II	Church Road	church building		9 June 2014	SO8560219661; 51°52′31″N 2°12′38″W		1419405	Church of the Holy Trinity More images	Q26676741
2, Clarence Street (see Details for Further Address Information)	II	2, Clarence Street			23 January 1952	SO8336118400; 51°51′50″N 2°14′35″W		1271588	Upload Photo	Q26561524
4 and 6, Clarence Street	II	4 and 6, Clarence Street			23 January 1952	SO8338318427; 51°51′51″N 2°14′34″W		1271589	Upload Photo	Q26561525
Numbers 8, 10 and 12 and Attached Area Railings	II	10 and 12 And Attached Area Railings, 8, 10 and 12, Clarence Street			12 March 1973	SO8339618441; 51°51′51″N 2°14′33″W		1271590	Upload Photo	Q26561526
18-30, Clarence Street	II	18-30, Clarence Street			23 January 1952	SO8344018489; 51°51′53″N 2°14′31″W		1271591	Upload Photo	Q26561527
1 and 1a-9, College Court	II	1 and 1a-9, College Court			23 January 1952	SO8307818685; 51°51′59″N 2°14′50″W		1271592	Upload Photo	Q26561528
War Memorial to the Royal Gloucestershire Hussars Yeomanry	II*	College Green	war memorial		15 December 1998	SO8301818812; 51°52′03″N 2°14′53″W		1245906	War Memorial to the Royal Gloucestershire Hussars Yeomanry More images	Q26263469
St Michael's Gate	I	College Green	gate		23 January 1952	SO8309318698; 51°52′00″N 2°14′49″W		1245905	St Michael's Gate More images	Q17525923
1, College Green	II	1, College Green			12 March 1973	SO8308618705; 51°52′00″N 2°14′49″W		1271593	1, College Green More images	Q26561529
2, College Green	II	2, College Green			12 March 1973	SO8307618710; 51°52′00″N 2°14′50″W		1271594	2, College Green More images	Q26561530
3 College Green, and Attached Area Railings	II	3, College Green, GL1 2LR			23 January 1952	SO8306918715; 51°52′00″N 2°14′50″W		1271595	3 College Green, and Attached Area Railings More images	Q26561531
4, College Green, and Attached Area Railings	II	4, College Green, GL1 2LR			23 January 1952	SO8305818722; 51°52′01″N 2°14′51″W		1271596	Upload Photo	Q26561532
6, College Green	II	6, College Green			12 March 1973	SO8303618746; 51°52′01″N 2°14′52″W		1271597	Upload Photo	Q26561533
7, 7a, 7b and 7c, College Green	II	7, 7a, 7b and 7c, College Green			23 January 1952	SO8301618757; 51°52′02″N 2°14′53″W		1271598	7, 7a, 7b and 7c, College Green More images	Q26561534
9, College Green	II*	9, College Green	house		23 January 1952	SO8298918796; 51°52′03″N 2°14′54″W		1271600	9, College Green More images	Q17537691
10, College Green	II	10, College Green			23 January 1952	SO8297918809; 51°52′03″N 2°14′55″W		1271601	10, College Green More images	Q26561536
11, College Green	II	11, College Green			23 January 1952	SO8298318815; 51°52′04″N 2°14′55″W		1271602	11, College Green More images	Q26561537
Beaufort House	II	12, College Green			12 March 1973	SO8299018832; 51°52′04″N 2°14′54″W		1271603	Upload Photo	Q26682976
13, College Green	II	13, College Green			23 January 1952	SO8299818846; 51°52′05″N 2°14′54″W		1245895	13, College Green More images	Q26538375
14, College Green	II*	14, College Green	building		23 January 1952	SO8300318854; 51°52′05″N 2°14′54″W		1245896	14, College Green More images	Q17537650
Community House and Attached Wall with Piers	II	15, College Green			23 January 1952	SO8302418864; 51°52′05″N 2°14′53″W		1245898	Upload Photo	Q26538376
Church House	I	16, College Green	house		23 January 1952	SO8306318828; 51°52′04″N 2°14′51″W		1245900	Church House More images	Q17525922
17, College Green	II	17, College Green			23 January 1952	SO8311818729; 51°52′01″N 2°14′48″W		1245901	Upload Photo	Q26538377
18, College Green	II	18, College Green			23 January 1952	SO8311618717; 51°52′00″N 2°14′48″W		1245902	Upload Photo	Q26538378
Number 19 and Attached Forecourt Walls and Overthrow Arch	II	19, College Green			23 January 1952	SO8311318704; 51°52′00″N 2°14′48″W		1245903	Number 19 and Attached Forecourt Walls and Overthrow Arch More images	Q26538379
Number 20 and Part of Abbey Precinct Wall	II*	20, College Green	house		12 March 1973	SO8310918694; 51°52′00″N 2°14′48″W		1245904	Number 20 and Part of Abbey Precinct Wall More images	Q17537658
Entrance Gate Piers to Number 12 Beaufort House	II	College Green			15 December 1998	SO8299818819; 51°52′04″N 2°14′54″W		1271604	Upload Photo	Q26561539
Inner Gate Adjoining Number 15 College Green	I	College Green	architectural structure		23 January 1952	SO8303318855; 51°52′05″N 2°14′52″W		1245899	Inner Gate Adjoining Number 15 College Green More images	Q17525921
St Marys Gate Adjoining Number 14 College Green	I	College Green	building		23 January 1952	SO8300818865; 51°52′05″N 2°14′53″W		1245897	St Marys Gate Adjoining Number 14 College Green More images	Q17525920
58, Westgate Street	II	2-8, College Street			15 December 1998	SO8303818703; 51°52′00″N 2°14′52″W		1271938	58, Westgate Street More images	Q26561821
3, College Street	II	3, College Street			12 March 1973	SO8301918706; 51°52′00″N 2°14′53″W		1245907	Upload Photo	Q26538380
5, 7, 9, and 11 College Street	II*	5, 7, 9, And 11 College Street, GL1 2NE	building		23 January 1952	SO8301818711; 51°52′00″N 2°14′53″W		1245908	5, 7, 9, and 11 College Street More images	Q17537661
King Edward's Gate	II*	13, College Street, GL1 2NE	gate		23 January 1952	SO8303118732; 51°52′01″N 2°14′52″W		1245909	King Edward's Gate More images	Q17537666
Numbers 8 and 8a and Attached Wall and Outbuilding to College Yard	II	1, 2 and 3, College Yard			12 March 1973	SO8298818773; 51°52′02″N 2°14′55″W		1271599	Numbers 8 and 8a and Attached Wall and Outbuilding to College Yard More images	Q26561535
1, Commercial Road	II	1, Commercial Road			12 March 1973	SO8300418368; 51°51′49″N 2°14′54″W		1271648	1, Commercial Road More images	Q26561580
3, Commercial Road	II	3, Commercial Road			15 December 1998	SO8298818366; 51°51′49″N 2°14′54″W		1271649	Upload Photo	Q26561581
Criterion Hotel	II	5, Commercial Road			15 December 1998	SO8298018365; 51°51′49″N 2°14′55″W		1271650	Upload Photo	Q26561582
Navigation House	II	23 and 25, Commercial Road			12 March 1973	SO8291218369; 51°51′49″N 2°14′58″W		1271651	Upload Photo	Q26561583
Numbers 27 and 29 and Attached Front Area Railings and Gates	II	27 and 29, Commercial Road			12 March 1973	SO8289918379; 51°51′49″N 2°14′59″W		1271652	Upload Photo	Q26561584
Regiments of Gloucestershire Museum	II	31, Commercial Road			12 March 1973	SO8287518393; 51°51′50″N 2°15′00″W		1271653	Upload Photo	Q26561585
Governor's House and Attached Railings, Former Her Majesty's Prison Gloucester	II	Commercial Road			12 March 1973	SO8280918475; 51°51′53″N 2°15′04″W		1271654	Upload Photo	Q26561586
Church of St Oswald	II	Coney Hill Road	church building		21 June 2000	SO8533817117; 51°51′09″N 2°12′51″W		1380619	Church of St Oswald More images	Q26660807
Winston Hall	II*	Constitution Walk	house		23 January 1952	SO8323818375; 51°51′49″N 2°14′41″W		1271655	Winston Hall More images	Q17537692
Cross Keys Inn	II	Cross Keys Lane	pub		23 January 1952	SO8309118516; 51°51′54″N 2°14′49″W		1271656	Cross Keys Inn More images	Q26561587
Mercers' Hall	II	Cross Keys Lane			23 January 1952	SO8308018547; 51°51′55″N 2°14′50″W		1271657	Upload Photo	Q26561588
Girls High School	II	Denmark Road			12 March 1973	SO8379819388; 51°52′22″N 2°14′12″W		1271658	Upload Photo	Q26561589
Hillfield House	II	Denmark Road	house		12 March 1973	SO8426519067; 51°52′12″N 2°13′48″W		1271659	Hillfield House More images	Q26561590
Entrance Portico, Eastgate Shopping Centre	II	Eastgate Shopping Centre, Eastgate Street	shopping center		4 June 1975	SO8325218452; 51°51′52″N 2°14′41″W		1245821	Entrance Portico, Eastgate Shopping Centre More images	Q26538311
17, Eastgate Street	II	17, Eastgate Street			23 January 1952	SO8322518522; 51°51′54″N 2°14′42″W		1271660	Upload Photo	Q26561591
Lloyds Bank	II	19, Eastgate Street	bank building		15 December 1998	SO8323318514; 51°51′54″N 2°14′42″W		1271661	Lloyds Bank More images	Q26561592
National Westminster Bank	II	21, Eastgate Street			12 March 1973	SO8324418502; 51°51′53″N 2°14′41″W		1271662	Upload Photo	Q26561593
Guildhall	II	23, Eastgate Street	movie theater		12 March 1973	SO8325318495; 51°51′53″N 2°14′41″W		1271663	Guildhall More images	Q18347301
58, Eastgate Street	II	58, Eastgate Street			23 January 1952	SO8338618341; 51°51′48″N 2°14′34″W		1271664	Upload Photo	Q26561595
62 and 64, Eastgate Street	II	62 and 64, Eastgate Street			12 March 1973	SO8340118338; 51°51′48″N 2°14′33″W		1271665	Upload Photo	Q26561596
66, Eastgate Street	II	66, Eastgate Street			15 December 1998	SO8340518332; 51°51′48″N 2°14′33″W		1271666	Upload Photo	Q26561597
67 and 69, Eastgate Street	II	67 and 69, Eastgate Street			23 January 1952	SO8339718375; 51°51′49″N 2°14′33″W		1271667	Upload Photo	Q26561598
70, Eastgate Street	II	70, Eastgate Street			15 December 1998	SO8340318324; 51°51′48″N 2°14′33″W		1271668	Upload Photo	Q26561599
72, Eastgate Street	II	72, Eastgate Street			23 January 1952	SO8339618299; 51°51′47″N 2°14′33″W		1271669	Upload Photo	Q26561600
80 and 80a, Eastgate Street	II	80 and 80a, Eastgate Street			15 December 1998	SO8343118314; 51°51′47″N 2°14′31″W		1271670	Upload Photo	Q26561601
87, Eastgate Street	II	87, Eastgate Street			12 March 1973	SO8344318335; 51°51′48″N 2°14′31″W		1271671	Upload Photo	Q26561602
Ivy House	II	94, Eastgate Street			23 January 1952	SO8346518278; 51°51′46″N 2°14′29″W		1271672	Upload Photo	Q26561603
96, 98 and 100, Eastgate Street	II	96, 98 and 100, Eastgate Street			23 January 1952	SO8349118260; 51°51′46″N 2°14′28″W		1271673	Upload Photo	Q26561604
Annandale House	II	105, Eastgate Street			12 March 1973	SO8349318294; 51°51′47″N 2°14′28″W		1245818	Upload Photo	Q26538308
108, Eastgate Street	II	108, Eastgate Street			12 March 1973	SO8352418233; 51°51′45″N 2°14′26″W		1245819	Upload Photo	Q26538309
111, Eastgate Street	II	111, Eastgate Street			23 January 1952	SO8351818278; 51°51′46″N 2°14′27″W		1245820	Upload Photo	Q26538310
Tower of the Former Church of St Michael	II*	Eastgate Street	church tower		23 January 1952	SO8317018541; 51°51′55″N 2°14′45″W		1245822	Tower of the Former Church of St Michael More images	Q7594820
Anglican Church of St Aldate	II*	Finlay Road, GL4 6TN			9 December 1999	SO8435816478; 51°50′48″N 2°13′43″W		1379929	Upload Photo	Q17537743
Milepost at Ngr So 813 155	II	Gloucester And Sharpness Canal			30 November 1989	SO8133015485; 51°50′16″N 2°16′21″W		1245823	Upload Photo	Q26538312
The Remains of Tanners' Hall	II	Gouda Way	ruins		29 July 2015	SO8336318902; 51°52′06″N 2°14′35″W		1422933	The Remains of Tanners' Hall More images	Q17677444
Parsonage Cottage	II	4, Green Lane, Hucclecote			12 March 1973	SO8736617264; 51°51′14″N 2°11′05″W		1245824	Upload Photo	Q26538313
Addisons Folly	II	Greyfriars			12 March 1973	SO8313818407; 51°51′50″N 2°14′47″W		1245825	Upload Photo	Q26538314
Gatehouse to Forecourt of Society of Friends Meeting House	II	Greyfriars			12 March 1973	SO8309318384; 51°51′50″N 2°14′49″W		1245829	Upload Photo	Q26538317
Greyfriars House and Attached Remains of Greyfriars Church	I	Greyfriars			23 January 1952	SO8314518359; 51°51′49″N 2°14′46″W		1245826	Upload Photo	Q17645913
Greyfriars Inn in Range Behind Number 31 Southgate Street Service Range at Rear of Number 31	II	Greyfriars			15 December 1998	SO8310918435; 51°51′51″N 2°14′48″W		1245827	Upload Photo	Q26538315
8, Hare Lane	II	8, Hare Lane			23 January 1952	SO8329218741; 51°52′01″N 2°14′39″W		1245830	Upload Photo	Q26538318
Gloucester Old Peoples Centre	II	Hare Lane			23 January 1952	SO8331218786; 51°52′03″N 2°14′38″W		1245831	Upload Photo	Q26538319
Two K6 Telephone Kiosks, Hare Lane	II	Hare Lane			15 February 1989	SO8329018737; 51°52′01″N 2°14′39″W		1271677	Upload Photo	Q26561607
Church of St Swithun	II*	Hempsted	church building		10 January 1955	SO8136417033; 51°51′06″N 2°16′19″W		1271743	Church of St Swithun More images	Q17537717
Kings Board, Hillfield Gardens	II*	Hillfield Gardens, London Road	architectural structure		23 January 1952	SO8425618976; 51°52′09″N 2°13′48″W		1245719	Kings Board, Hillfield Gardens More images	Q17537602
Scriven's Conduit	II*	Hillfield Gardens, London Road	architectural structure		25 January 1952	SO8422418971; 51°52′09″N 2°13′50″W		1245720	Scriven's Conduit More images	Q17537606
Newark House	II	Honeythorne Close, Hempsted			15 December 1998	SO8168317428; 51°51′18″N 2°16′02″W		1271678	Upload Photo	Q26561608
Collingwood House and Attached Front Quadrant Walls	II	Horton Road			15 December 1998	SO8445518567; 51°51′56″N 2°13′38″W		1271679	Upload Photo	Q26561609
Horton Road Hospital Including Area Railings	II*	Horton Road	hospital		28 May 1991	SO8438318527; 51°51′54″N 2°13′42″W		1271680	Horton Road Hospital Including Area Railings More images	Q17537699
Wotton House	II	Horton Road			23 January 1952	SO8446818813; 51°52′04″N 2°13′37″W		1271681	Upload Photo	Q26561610
Green Farmhouse	II	Hucclecote Green, Hucclecote			15 December 1998	SO8716416764; 51°50′58″N 2°11′16″W		1271682	Upload Photo	Q26561611
Hucclecote Memorial Cross	II	Hucclecote Road	war memorial		10 March 2015	SO8740717299; 51°51′15″N 2°11′03″W		1425089	Hucclecote Memorial Cross More images	Q26677156
Hucclecote Mews	II	78, Hucclecote Road, Hucclecote			10 January 1955	SO8701017506; 51°51′22″N 2°11′24″W		1271683	Upload Photo	Q26561612
The Vicarage	II	88 and 90, Hucclecote Road, Hucclecote			10 January 1955	SO8706617460; 51°51′20″N 2°11′21″W		1271684	Upload Photo	Q26561613
Vine Cottage and Old Farm Cottage	II	101 and 103, Hucclecote Road, Hucclecote			12 March 1973	SO8728717403; 51°51′18″N 2°11′10″W		1271685	Upload Photo	Q26561614
Gartage Hall	II	117, Hucclecote Road, Hucclecote			29 March 1990	SO8744217318; 51°51′16″N 2°11′01″W		1271687	Upload Photo	Q26561616
Barn to West of Gartage Hall	II	113a, Hucclecote Road, Hucclecote			7 May 1991	SO8742917353; 51°51′17″N 2°11′02″W		1271686	Upload Photo	Q26561615
Forge House	II	Hucclecote Road, Hucclecote			10 January 1955	SO8699117568; 51°51′24″N 2°11′25″W		1271688	Upload Photo	Q26561617
Hucclecote Court	II	Hucclecote Road, Hucclecote	building		10 January 1955	SO8698017520; 51°51′22″N 2°11′26″W		1271689	Hucclecote Court More images	Q26561618
Old Turnpike House	II	43, Kingsholm Road	house		12 March 1973	SO8350219562; 51°52′28″N 2°14′28″W		1271690	Old Turnpike House More images	Q26561619
80 and 82, Kingsholm Road	II	80 and 82, Kingsholm Road			12 March 1973	SO8352619497; 51°52′26″N 2°14′27″W		1271691	Upload Photo	Q26561620
84 and 86, Kingsholm Road	II	84 and 86, Kingsholm Road			12 March 1973	SO8352619524; 51°52′27″N 2°14′27″W		1245749	Upload Photo	Q26538245
Church of St Mark, Front Wall and Gate Piers	II	Kingsholm Road			12 June 1992	SO8346419078; 51°52′12″N 2°14′30″W		1245750	Upload Photo	Q26538246
13, Kingsholm Square	II	13, Kingsholm Square			12 March 1973	SO8339619527; 51°52′27″N 2°14′33″W		1245751	Upload Photo	Q26538247
13, Ladybellegate Street	II*	13, Ladybellegate Street			23 January 1952	SO8294118428; 51°51′51″N 2°14′57″W		1245752	Upload Photo	Q17537635
15, Ladybellegate Street	II*	15, Ladybellegate Street			23 January 1952	SO8293818423; 51°51′51″N 2°14′57″W		1245753	Upload Photo	Q17537640
17, Ladybellegate Street	II*	17, Ladybellegate Street			23 January 1952	SO8293518418; 51°51′51″N 2°14′57″W		1245754	Upload Photo	Q17537644
Mariners Hall	II	1 and 1a, Llanthony Road			12 March 1973	SO8279718043; 51°51′39″N 2°15′04″W		1245761	Upload Photo	Q26538254
St Lukes House	II	3, Llanthony Road			15 December 1998	SO8277018056; 51°51′39″N 2°15′06″W		1245762	Upload Photo	Q26538255
Bridge House	II	22, Llanthony Road			12 March 1973	SO8265918136; 51°51′42″N 2°15′12″W		1245764	Upload Photo	Q26538257
Sudbrooke House	II	71-72, Llanthony Road, Gloucester Quays, GL1 5SH			15 December 1998	SO8274518066; 51°51′39″N 2°15′07″W		1245763	Upload Photo	Q26538256
Llanthony Priory Farmhouse	II	Llanthony Road			23 January 1952	SO8237917984; 51°51′37″N 2°15′26″W		1245765	Upload Photo	Q26538258
Llanthony Swing Bridge	II	Llanthony Road, Gloucester Docks			3 February 2003	SO8231918248; 51°51′45″N 2°15′29″W		1393287	Upload Photo	Q26672462
Sheraton House and Attached Area Railings	II	18, London Road			23 January 1952	SO8366218782; 51°52′03″N 2°14′19″W		1271699	Upload Photo	Q26561621
Northgate House and Attached Walls and Railings to Forecourt	II*	19, London Road	house		23 January 1952	SO8361018804; 51°52′03″N 2°14′22″W		1271700	Northgate House and Attached Walls and Railings to Forecourt More images	Q17537705
20, London Road	II	20, London Road			23 January 1952	SO8366918786; 51°52′03″N 2°14′19″W		1271701	Upload Photo	Q26561622
22, London Road	II	22, London Road			23 January 1952	SO8367318787; 51°52′03″N 2°14′19″W		1271702	Upload Photo	Q26561623
Claremont House	II	42, London Road			23 January 1952	SO8378618802; 51°52′03″N 2°14′13″W		1271703	Upload Photo	Q26561624
The Elms	II	44, London Road			12 March 1973	SO8383718818; 51°52′04″N 2°14′10″W		1271704	Upload Photo	Q26561625
St Nicholas House	II	47, London Road			12 March 1973	SO8379218862; 51°52′05″N 2°14′12″W		1271705	Upload Photo	Q26561626
49 and 51, London Road	II	49 and 51, London Road			15 December 1998	SO8381118857; 51°52′05″N 2°14′11″W		1245734	Upload Photo	Q26538231
York Buildings	II	78-90, London Road			23 January 1952	SO8404518890; 51°52′06″N 2°13′59″W		1245735	Upload Photo	Q26538232
The Edward Hotel	II	92, London Road			15 December 1998	SO8406918903; 51°52′06″N 2°13′58″W		1245736	Upload Photo	Q26538233
Hillfield Parade	II	100 and 102, London Road			25 January 1952	SO8423918932; 51°52′07″N 2°13′49″W		1245737	Upload Photo	Q26538234
Gate Lodge to West of Entrance Gates to Hillfield Rest Garden	II	101, London Road			12 March 1973	SO8428618972; 51°52′09″N 2°13′47″W		1245738	Upload Photo	Q26538235
Hillfield Parade	II	104-116, London Road			23 January 1952	SO8426818937; 51°52′08″N 2°13′48″W		1245739	Upload Photo	Q26681110
Parkfield	II	115, London Road			23 January 1952	SO8457618913; 51°52′07″N 2°13′32″W		1245740	Upload Photo	Q26538237
Hillfield Parade	II	118, London Road			23 January 1952	SO8429218940; 51°52′08″N 2°13′46″W		1245741	Upload Photo	Q26891078
138, London Road	II	138, London Road			12 March 1973	SO8444218930; 51°52′07″N 2°13′39″W		1245742	Upload Photo	Q26538239
Wotton Rise	II	140, London Road			12 March 1973	SO8445418924; 51°52′07″N 2°13′38″W		1245743	Upload Photo	Q26538240
Chapel of St Mary Magdalene	II*	London Road	chapel		23 January 1952	SO8432318988; 51°52′09″N 2°13′45″W		1245744	Chapel of St Mary Magdalene More images	Q17537631
Church of St Catharine	II	London Road, GL2 0RR	church building		12 March 1973	SO8444318985; 51°52′09″N 2°13′38″W		1245745	Church of St Catharine More images	Q26538241
Entrance Gates to Hillfield Gardens	II	London Road			15 December 1998	SO8427618969; 51°52′09″N 2°13′47″W		1245747	Upload Photo	Q26538243
Presbytery Adjoining Roman Catholic Church of St Peter	II	London Road			15 December 1998	SO8352718772; 51°52′02″N 2°14′26″W		1245722	Upload Photo	Q26538224
Roman Catholic Church of St Peter	II*	London Road	parish church		12 March 1973	SO8351218781; 51°52′02″N 2°14′27″W		1245721	Roman Catholic Church of St Peter More images	Q17537610
St Margarets Chapel	II*	London Road	chapel		23 January 1952	SO8411418909; 51°52′07″N 2°13′56″W		1245723	St Margarets Chapel More images	Q17537614
United Hospitals	II	London Road			4 August 1971	SO8417118914; 51°52′07″N 2°13′53″W		1245724	Upload Photo	Q26538225
28, Southgate Street (see Details for Further Address Information)	II	2, Longsmith Street			12 March 1973	SO8308218488; 51°51′53″N 2°14′50″W		1271753	Upload Photo	Q26561666
4, Longsmith Street	II	4, Longsmith Street			23 January 1952	SO8307718493; 51°51′53″N 2°14′50″W		1245725	Upload Photo	Q26538226
Ladybellegate House	I	20, Longsmith Street	house		23 January 1952	SO8300318556; 51°51′55″N 2°14′54″W		1245726	Ladybellegate House More images	Q6470730
Bearland House and Attached Railings and Gates to Forecourt	II*	57 and 59, Longsmith Street	building		7 September 1970	SO8293918570; 51°51′56″N 2°14′57″W		1245728	Bearland House and Attached Railings and Gates to Forecourt More images	Q17537623
Bearland Lodge	II*	Longsmith Street	gatehouse		23 January 1952	SO8295718563; 51°51′55″N 2°14′56″W		1245727	Bearland Lodge More images	Q17537618
Matson War Memorial	II	Matson Lane, Matson			13 August 2014	SO8474215479; 51°50′16″N 2°13′22″W		1419823	Upload Photo	Q26676757
Boundary Wall on Street Frontage to South-west and South of Matson House	II	Matson Lane, Matson			15 December 1998	SO8479215452; 51°50′15″N 2°13′20″W		1245731	Upload Photo	Q26538228
Former Stable Block to North-east of Matson House	II	Matson Lane, Matson			15 December 1998	SO8482015508; 51°50′17″N 2°13′18″W		1245732	Upload Photo	Q26538229
Gloucester Country Club	II	Matson Lane, Matson			23 January 1952	SO8488915116; 51°50′04″N 2°13′15″W		1245729	Upload Photo	Q26538227
Matson House and Attached Wall	II*	Matson Lane, Matson			23 January 1952	SO8481515463; 51°50′15″N 2°13′18″W		1245730	Upload Photo	Q17537627
70-84, Melbourne Street	II	70-84, Melbourne Street			21 January 1987	SO8396417207; 51°51′12″N 2°14′03″W		1245733	Upload Photo	Q26538230
Downings Malthouse	II	Merchants Road	architectural structure		12 March 1973	SO8263817943; 51°51′35″N 2°15′13″W		1271707	Downings Malthouse More images	Q26561628
Downings Malthouse Extension	II	Merchants Road			12 March 1973	SO8258517943; 51°51′35″N 2°15′15″W		1271708	Upload Photo	Q26561629
Iron Framed Shed to South of Downings Malthouse	II	Merchants Road			15 December 1998	SO8255517912; 51°51′34″N 2°15′17″W		1271709	Upload Photo	Q26561630
Llanthony Provender Mill	II	Merchants Road	mill building		12 March 1973	SO8253417848; 51°51′32″N 2°15′18″W		1271710	Llanthony Provender Mill More images	Q26561631
Pillar Warehouse	II	Merchants Road			12 March 1973	SO8262218050; 51°51′39″N 2°15′14″W		1271711	Upload Photo	Q26561632
The Deanery and Attached Forecourt Walls and Railings	II*	1, Millers Green	architectural structure		23 January 1952	SO8303718882; 51°52′06″N 2°14′52″W		1271712	The Deanery and Attached Forecourt Walls and Railings More images	Q17537707
The Old Mill House	II	2, Millers Green			23 January 1952	SO8305118888; 51°52′06″N 2°14′51″W		1271713	The Old Mill House More images	Q26561633
3, Millers Green	II*	3, Millers Green	building		23 January 1952	SO8309618870; 51°52′05″N 2°14′49″W		1271714	3, Millers Green More images	Q17537714
4a, Millers Green	II	4a, Millers Green			23 January 1952	SO8308618873; 51°52′05″N 2°14′49″W		1271715	4a, Millers Green More images	Q26561634
4b, Millers Green	II	4b, Millers Green			23 January 1952	SO8307918869; 51°52′05″N 2°14′50″W		1271716	Upload Photo	Q26561635
5, Millers Green	II	5, Millers Green			23 January 1952	SO8308118863; 51°52′05″N 2°14′50″W		1271717	Upload Photo	Q26561636
Numbers 6a, 6b and 6c and Attached Forecourt Walls	II	6b and 6c And Attached Forecourt Walls, 6a, 6b and 6c, Millers Green			23 January 1952	SO8307318856; 51°52′05″N 2°14′50″W		1271718	Numbers 6a, 6b and 6c and Attached Forecourt Walls More images	Q26561637
Number 7 and Attached Wall	II	7, Millers Green			23 January 1952	SO8304418854; 51°52′05″N 2°14′52″W		1271719	Number 7 and Attached Wall More images	Q26561638
North Villas	II	1 and 2, Montpellier			10 November 1989	SO8316617964; 51°51′36″N 2°14′45″W		1245705	Upload Photo	Q26538211
Spa Villas	II	1 and 2, Montpellier			23 January 1952	SO8320217949; 51°51′36″N 2°14′43″W		1245706	Upload Photo	Q26538212
Spa Villas	II	3 and 4, Montpellier			23 January 1952	SO8319317932; 51°51′35″N 2°14′44″W		1245707	Upload Photo	Q26681106
Spa Villas	II	5 and 6, Montpellier			23 January 1952	SO8318417915; 51°51′34″N 2°14′44″W		1245708	Upload Photo	Q26891077
The Byways	II	Montpellier			23 January 1952	SO8319417858; 51°51′33″N 2°14′44″W		1245709	Upload Photo	Q26538215
27, 27a, 29 and 29a, Moor Street	II	27, 27a, 29 and 29a, Moor Street			15 December 1998	SO8396917336; 51°51′16″N 2°14′03″W		1245710	Upload Photo	Q26538216
24 and 26, Morpeth Street	II	24 and 26, Morpeth Street			5 June 1987	SO8371217339; 51°51′16″N 2°14′16″W		1245711	Upload Photo	Q26538217
Remains of Reservoir, North West Corner of Cathedral Cloister Garth	I	North West Corner Of Cathedral Cloister Garth, Cathedral Precincts			23 January 1952	SO8309118835; 51°52′04″N 2°14′49″W		1245955	Upload Photo	Q17525929
6, 8 and 10, Northgate Street	II	6, 8 and 10, Northgate Street			23 January 1952	SO8319418567; 51°51′56″N 2°14′44″W		1245712	Upload Photo	Q26538218
11, Northgate Street	II	11, Northgate Street			12 March 1973	SO8318818599; 51°51′57″N 2°14′44″W		1245713	Upload Photo	Q26538219
New Inn	I	16, 18 and 20, Northgate Street	pub		23 January 1952	SO8321218587; 51°51′56″N 2°14′43″W		1245714	New Inn More images	Q7753629
Imperial Inn	II	59, Northgate Street			12 March 1973	SO8330518712; 51°52′00″N 2°14′38″W		1245715	Upload Photo	Q26538220
62, Northgate Street	II	62, Northgate Street			15 December 1998	SO8330418689; 51°51′59″N 2°14′38″W		1245716	Upload Photo	Q26538221
Northend Vaults	II	86 and 88, Northgate Street			23 January 1952	SO8338318704; 51°52′00″N 2°14′34″W		1245671	Upload Photo	Q26538179
102, Northgate Street	II	102, Northgate Street			15 December 1998	SO8342318721; 51°52′01″N 2°14′32″W		1245672	Upload Photo	Q26538180
Church of St John Northgate	II*	Northgate Street	church building		23 January 1952	SO8324318683; 51°51′59″N 2°14′41″W		1245673	Church of St John Northgate More images	Q17537597
2-20, Oxford Street	II	2-20, Oxford Street			12 March 1973	SO8368918861; 51°52′05″N 2°14′18″W		1245675	Upload Photo	Q26538182
1a-11, 15 and 17, Oxford Street	II	1a-11, 15 and 17, Oxford Street			12 March 1973	SO8366718852; 51°52′05″N 2°14′19″W		1245674	Upload Photo	Q26538181
The Victoria Inn	II	22, Oxford Street			12 March 1973	SO8368118888; 51°52′06″N 2°14′18″W		1245676	Upload Photo	Q26538183
29 and 31, Oxford Street	II	29 and 31, Oxford Street			12 March 1973	SO8365918907; 51°52′07″N 2°14′19″W		1245677	Upload Photo	Q26538184
The Cottage	II	230, Painswick Road, Matson			12 March 1973	SO8481616440; 51°50′47″N 2°13′19″W		1245678	Upload Photo	Q26538185
Saintbridge House Old Peoples Home	II	Painswick Road, Matson			12 March 1973	SO8490616380; 51°50′45″N 2°13′14″W		1245679	Upload Photo	Q26538186
St James Place and Attached Front Railings	II	4, 6 and 8, Park Road			23 January 1952	SO8317318080; 51°51′40″N 2°14′45″W		1245680	Upload Photo	Q26538187
St James Place	II	10, Park Road			23 January 1952	SO8318318075; 51°51′40″N 2°14′44″W		1245681	Upload Photo	Q26538188
City of Gloucester War Memorial	II	Park Road, GL1 1LF	war memorial		22 April 2022	SO8346917956; 51°51′36″N 2°14′29″W		1477561	City of Gloucester War Memorial More images	Q111853471
Whitefield Memorial Presbyterian Church	II	Park Road			15 December 1998	SO8345118028; 51°51′38″N 2°14′30″W		1245682	Upload Photo	Q26538189
3 and 4, Pitt Street	II	3 and 4, Pitt Street	building		12 March 1973	SO8326618805; 51°52′03″N 2°14′40″W		1245683	3 and 4, Pitt Street More images	Q20878140
5, Pitt Street	II	5, Pitt Street			23 January 1952	SO8320818862; 51°52′05″N 2°14′43″W		1245684	Upload Photo	Q26538191
6, Pitt Street	II	6, Pitt Street			23 January 1952	SO8319918867; 51°52′05″N 2°14′43″W		1245685	Upload Photo	Q26538192
7-11, Pitt Street	II	7-11, Pitt Street			23 January 1952	SO8318818876; 51°52′06″N 2°14′44″W		1245686	7-11, Pitt Street More images	Q26538193
12, Pitt Street	II	12, Pitt Street			23 January 1952	SO8317918887; 51°52′06″N 2°14′45″W		1245687	Upload Photo	Q26538194
13, Pitt Street	II	13, Pitt Street			23 January 1952	SO8317318892; 51°52′06″N 2°14′45″W		1245688	Upload Photo	Q26538195
Paddock House	II	Pitt Street			23 January 1952	SO8322118845; 51°52′05″N 2°14′42″W		1245689	Upload Photo	Q26538196
5-8, Priory Place	II	5-8, Priory Place			12 March 1973	SO8310418365; 51°51′49″N 2°14′48″W		1245690	Upload Photo	Q26538197
Priory House	II	Priory Place			12 March 1973	SO8309218353; 51°51′49″N 2°14′49″W		1245691	Upload Photo	Q26538198
St Oswalds Priory	I	Priory Road	church building		23 January 1952	SO8304219007; 51°52′10″N 2°14′52″W		1245658	St Oswalds Priory More images	Q3402932
Llanthony Priory, Range Between Outer and Inner Courts	I	Range Between Outer And Inner Courts, Llanthony Road			23 January 1952	SO8238918003; 51°51′37″N 2°15′26″W		1271693	Upload Photo	Q17525938
Hempsted House	II	Rectory Lane, Hempsted			12 March 1973	SO8138616988; 51°51′04″N 2°16′18″W		1245659	Upload Photo	Q26538170
Llanthony Priory, Remains of Outer Gatehouse	I	Remains Of Outer Gatehouse, Llanthony Road			23 January 1952	SO8229718025; 51°51′38″N 2°15′30″W		1271694	Upload Photo	Q17525939
Llanthony Priory, Remains of Precinct Wall North of Inner Gatehouse	I	Remains Of Precinct Wall North Of Inner Gatehouse, Llanthony Road	wall		23 January 1952	SO8234718066; 51°51′39″N 2°15′28″W		1271695	Llanthony Priory, Remains of Precinct Wall North of Inner Gatehouse More images	Q17525940
Llanthony Priory, Remains of Precinct Wall South of Outer Gatehouse	I	Remains Of Precinct Wall South Of Outer Gatehouse, Llanthony Road			23 January 1952	SO8228117997; 51°51′37″N 2°15′31″W		1271696	Upload Photo	Q17526027
Llanthony Priory, Remains of Range on South Side of Inner Court	I	Remains Of Range On South Side Of Inner Court, Llanthony Road	architectural structure		23 January 1952	SO8236317952; 51°51′36″N 2°15′27″W		1271697	Llanthony Priory, Remains of Range on South Side of Inner Court More images	Q17526031
Llanthony Priory, Remains of Tythe Barn on North Side of Inner Court	I	Remains Of Tythe Barn On North Side Of Inner Court, Llanthony Road			23 January 1952	SO8242718046; 51°51′39″N 2°15′24″W		1271698	Upload Photo	Q122830501
Well Cross in Robins Wood Hill Country Park at Ngr So 838 158	II*	Reservoir Road			15 December 1998	SO8387015848; 51°50′28″N 2°14′08″W		1245660	Upload Photo	Q99671032
Well House in Robins Wood Hill Country Park at Ngr So 840 156	II	Reservoir Road			15 December 1998	SO8400215613; 51°50′20″N 2°14′01″W		1245661	Upload Photo	Q26538171
Lock House	II	Severn Road			15 December 1998	SO8268618469; 51°51′52″N 2°15′10″W		1271746	Upload Photo	Q26561660
5, Southgate Street	II	5, Southgate Street			12 March 1973	SO8315518527; 51°51′54″N 2°14′46″W		1271747	Upload Photo	Q26561661
9 and 9a, Southgate Street	I	9 and 9a, Southgate Street	building		23 January 1952	SO8314818515; 51°51′54″N 2°14′46″W		1271748	9 and 9a, Southgate Street More images	Q17526037
12 and 14, Southgate Street	II	12 and 14, Southgate Street			12 March 1973	SO8312018521; 51°51′54″N 2°14′48″W		1271749	Upload Photo	Q26561662
16 and 18, Southgate Street	II	16 and 18, Southgate Street			12 March 1973	SO8311218514; 51°51′54″N 2°14′48″W		1271750	Upload Photo	Q26561663
24a 24 and 26, Southgate Street	II	24a 24 and 26, Southgate Street			15 December 1998	SO8309318491; 51°51′53″N 2°14′49″W		1271751	Upload Photo	Q26561664
27, Southgate Street	II	27, Southgate Street			23 January 1952	SO8310118459; 51°51′52″N 2°14′49″W		1271752	Upload Photo	Q26561665
29 and 31, Southgate Street	II*	29 and 31, Southgate Street	building		23 January 1952	SO8309618451; 51°51′52″N 2°14′49″W		1271754	29 and 31, Southgate Street More images	Q17537722
35, Southgate Street	II	35, Southgate Street			15 December 1998	SO8305318403; 51°51′50″N 2°14′51″W		1271756	Upload Photo	Q26561667
Robert Raikes' House	II*	36 and 38, Southgate Street	pub		23 January 1952	SO8306918463; 51°51′52″N 2°14′50″W		1271757	Robert Raikes' House More images	Q17537728
40, Southgate Street	II	40, Southgate Street			12 March 1973	SO8306418454; 51°51′52″N 2°14′50″W		1271758	Upload Photo	Q26561668
42, Southgate Street	II	42, Southgate Street			12 March 1973	SO8306018451; 51°51′52″N 2°14′51″W		1271759	Upload Photo	Q26561669
Copner House	II	43, Southgate Street			12 March 1973	SO8303918381; 51°51′49″N 2°14′52″W		1271760	Upload Photo	Q26561670
New County Hotel	II	44, Southgate Street			12 March 1973	SO8305218446; 51°51′52″N 2°14′51″W		1271761	Upload Photo	Q26561671
53, Southgate Street	II	53, Southgate Street			15 December 1998	SO8302418358; 51°51′49″N 2°14′53″W		1271762	Upload Photo	Q26561672
55 and 57, Southgate Street	II	55 and 57, Southgate Street			15 December 1998	SO8302118350; 51°51′48″N 2°14′53″W		1271763	Upload Photo	Q26561673
59, Southgate Street	II	59, Southgate Street			15 December 1998	SO8301918345; 51°51′48″N 2°14′53″W		1271764	Upload Photo	Q26561674
61, Southgate Street	II	61, Southgate Street			15 December 1998	SO8301718341; 51°51′48″N 2°14′53″W		1271765	Upload Photo	Q26561675
The Black Swan Hotel	II	68 and 70, Southgate Street	hotel		12 March 1973	SO8300518392; 51°51′50″N 2°14′54″W		1271766	The Black Swan Hotel More images	Q26561676
74, Southgate Street	II	74, Southgate Street			15 December 1998	SO8300318363; 51°51′49″N 2°14′54″W		1271767	Upload Photo	Q26561677
76, Southgate Street	II	76, Southgate Street			15 December 1998	SO8300218360; 51°51′49″N 2°14′54″W		1271768	Upload Photo	Q26561678
Albion House	II	77, Southgate Street	house		23 January 1952	SO8289518164; 51°51′42″N 2°14′59″W		1271769	Albion House More images	Q26561679
78, Southgate Street	II	78, Southgate Street			15 December 1998	SO8300018355; 51°51′49″N 2°14′54″W		1271771	Upload Photo	Q26561681
The Whitesmiths Arms	II	81, Southgate Street	pub		15 December 1998	SO8288118136; 51°51′42″N 2°15′00″W		1271772	The Whitesmiths Arms More images	Q26561682
83 and 85, Southgate Street	II	83 and 85, Southgate Street			12 March 1973	SO8287918131; 51°51′41″N 2°15′00″W		1271773	Upload Photo	Q26561683
105, Southgate Street	II	105, Southgate Street			12 March 1973	SO8285718082; 51°51′40″N 2°15′01″W		1271774	Upload Photo	Q26561684
107, Southgate Street	II	107, Southgate Street			12 March 1973	SO8285418075; 51°51′40″N 2°15′01″W		1271775	Upload Photo	Q26561685
113 and 115, Southgate Street	II	113 and 115, Southgate Street			12 March 1973	SO8284418056; 51°51′39″N 2°15′02″W		1245626	Upload Photo	Q26538139
117 and 119, Southgate Street	II	117 and 119, Southgate Street			12 March 1973	SO8284118049; 51°51′39″N 2°15′02″W		1245627	Upload Photo	Q26538140
Spalite Hotel	II	121, Southgate Street			12 March 1973	SO8283418011; 51°51′37″N 2°15′02″W		1245628	Upload Photo	Q26538141
123-131, Southgate Street	II	123-131, Southgate Street			23 January 1952	SO8283517982; 51°51′37″N 2°15′02″W		1245629	Upload Photo	Q26538142
133 and 135, Southgate Street	II	133 and 135, Southgate Street			12 March 1973	SO8283817961; 51°51′36″N 2°15′02″W		1245630	Upload Photo	Q26538143
The Tall Ships Public House	II	134, Southgate Street	pub		15 December 1998	SO8285818151; 51°51′42″N 2°15′01″W		1245631	The Tall Ships Public House More images	Q26538144
137, Southgate Street	II	137, Southgate Street			12 March 1973	SO8283817952; 51°51′36″N 2°15′02″W		1245632	Upload Photo	Q26538145
139 and 141, Southgate Street	II	139 and 141, Southgate Street			12 March 1973	SO8284217943; 51°51′35″N 2°15′02″W		1245633	Upload Photo	Q26538146
140 and 142, Southgate Street	II	140 and 142, Southgate Street			15 December 1998	SO8285318135; 51°51′42″N 2°15′01″W		1245634	Upload Photo	Q26538147
143-151, Southgate Street	II	143-151, Southgate Street			23 January 1952	SO8284317922; 51°51′35″N 2°15′02″W		1245635	Upload Photo	Q26538148
155 and 157, Southgate Street	II	155 and 157, Southgate Street			12 March 1973	SO8284817879; 51°51′33″N 2°15′02″W		1245636	Upload Photo	Q26538149
172, Southgate Street	II	172, Southgate Street			12 March 1973	SO8280118026; 51°51′38″N 2°15′04″W		1245637	Upload Photo	Q26538150
182 and 184, Southgate Street	II	182 and 184, Southgate Street			12 March 1973	SO8280317990; 51°51′37″N 2°15′04″W		1245610	Upload Photo	Q26538126
Church of St Mary De Crypt	I	Southgate Street, GL1 1TP	church building		23 January 1952	SO8308118419; 51°51′51″N 2°14′50″W		1245611	Church of St Mary De Crypt More images	Q7594622
Gloucester Quaker Meeting House	II	Southgate Street, GL1 1TS			12 March 1973	SO8307618365; 51°51′49″N 2°14′50″W		1245828	Upload Photo	Q26538316
K6 Telephone Kiosk Adjacent to Number 77	II	Southgate Street			15 February 1989	SO8288718162; 51°51′42″N 2°15′00″W		1271770	Upload Photo	Q26561680
St Mary De Crypt Grammar School	II*	31a, Southgate Street	school building		23 January 1952	SO8308118439; 51°51′51″N 2°14′50″W		1271755	St Mary De Crypt Grammar School More images	Q17537725
Weighbridge House	II	Southgate Street			12 March 1973	SO8286718174; 51°51′43″N 2°15′01″W		1245612	Upload Photo	Q26538127
2, Spa Road	II	2, Spa Road			12 March 1973	SO8283618020; 51°51′38″N 2°15′02″W		1245613	Upload Photo	Q26538128
Number 2, 3 and 4 Beaufort Buildings	II	3 and 4 Beaufort Buildings, 2 3 and 4, Spa Road			23 January 1952	SO8310117928; 51°51′35″N 2°14′48″W		1271781	Upload Photo	Q26561691
Number 5 and 6 Beaufort Buildings	II	5 and 6, Spa Road			23 January 1952	SO8312017917; 51°51′34″N 2°14′47″W		1271782	Upload Photo	Q26561692
Numbers 3, 5 and 7 and Attached Area Walls and Railings	II	5 and 7 And Attached Area Walls And Railings, 3 5 and 7, Spa Road			12 March 1973	SO8285318043; 51°51′39″N 2°15′01″W		1245614	Upload Photo	Q26538129
Norfolk House	II	6, Spa Road			12 March 1973	SO8288417992; 51°51′37″N 2°15′00″W		1245615	Upload Photo	Q26538130
Number 7 Beaufort Buildings	II	7, Spa Road			23 January 1952	SO8313317912; 51°51′34″N 2°14′47″W		1271783	Upload Photo	Q26561693
Numbers 9 and 11 and Attached Area Railings and Walls	II	9 and 11, Spa Road			12 March 1973	SO8286818036; 51°51′38″N 2°15′01″W		1245616	Upload Photo	Q26538131
Ribston Hall and Attached Frontage Railings	II	13 and 15, Spa Road			25 January 1952	SO8288818029; 51°51′38″N 2°15′00″W		1245618	Upload Photo	Q26538133
Maitland House	II	17, Spa Road			25 January 1952	SO8292618013; 51°51′38″N 2°14′58″W		1245619	Upload Photo	Q26538134
19 and 21, Spa Road	II	19 and 21, Spa Road			25 January 1952	SO8294318003; 51°51′37″N 2°14′57″W		1245620	Upload Photo	Q26538135
Sherborne House	II*	23 25 and 27, Spa Road			25 January 1952	SO8296817989; 51°51′37″N 2°14′55″W		1245621	Upload Photo	Q17537585
The Judges Lodgings and Attached Front Piers Walls and Balustrades	II*	29 and 31, Spa Road			25 January 1952	SO8299617975; 51°51′36″N 2°14′54″W		1245622	The Judges Lodgings and Attached Front Piers Walls and Balustrades More images	Q17537588
Number 11a and Attached Area Walls and Railings	II	11a, Spa Road			12 March 1973	SO8287618031; 51°51′38″N 2°15′00″W		1245617	Upload Photo	Q26538132
Statue of Queen Anne in Spa Field	II	Spa Road			23 January 1952	SO8305017746; 51°51′29″N 2°14′51″W		1271784	Upload Photo	Q26561694
6 8 and 10, St Catherine Street	II	6 8 and 10, St Catherine Street			12 March 1973	SO8336519030; 51°52′11″N 2°14′35″W		1245662	Upload Photo	Q26538172
Coach and Horses Inn	II	St Catherine Street	pub		23 January 1952	SO8338019029; 51°52′11″N 2°14′34″W		1245663	Coach and Horses Inn More images	Q26538173
17, St Johns Lane	II	17, St Johns Lane			12 March 1973	SO8321118693; 51°52′00″N 2°14′43″W		1245664	Upload Photo	Q26538174
Top of Spire from Church of St John Northgate in St Lucy's Garden	II	St Johns Lane			15 December 1998	SO8324618743; 51°52′01″N 2°14′41″W		1245665	Upload Photo	Q26538175
Anglican Church of St Mary De Lode	I	St Mary's Square	church building		23 January 1952	SO8294118912; 51°52′07″N 2°14′57″W		1245668	Anglican Church of St Mary De Lode More images	Q7594624
Bishop Hooper's Monument	II	St Mary's Square	monument		23 January 1952	SO8298818880; 51°52′06″N 2°14′55″W		1245667	Bishop Hooper's Monument More images	Q26538176
Monument House	II	St Mary's Street			23 January 1952	SO8301318873; 51°52′05″N 2°14′53″W		1245669	Upload Photo	Q26538177
Deaf Institute	II*	17, St Marys Square			23 January 1952	SO8294618856; 51°52′05″N 2°14′57″W		1245666	Upload Photo	Q17537594
Statue of Charles Ii	II	St Marys Square			12 March 1973	SO8294218832; 51°52′04″N 2°14′57″W		1245670	Upload Photo	Q26538178
College Arms	II	2 and 4, St Marys Street			12 March 1973	SO8309318966; 51°52′08″N 2°14′49″W		1271735	Upload Photo	Q26561652
6-12, St Marys Street	II	6-12, St Marys Street			12 March 1973	SO8309718984; 51°52′09″N 2°14′49″W		1271736	Upload Photo	Q26561653
War Memorial in St Swithun's Churchyard	II	St Swithun's Road, Hempsted	war memorial		16 April 2014	SO8139317007; 51°51′05″N 2°16′18″W		1419396	War Memorial in St Swithun's Churchyard More images	Q26676739
Boundary Wall Between Churchyard of the Church of St Swinthin and Hempstead House	II	St Swithuns Road, Hempsted			15 December 1998	SO8136917013; 51°51′05″N 2°16′19″W		1271738	Upload Photo	Q26561655
Chest Tomb Approximately 11 Metres South East of Chancel of Church of St Swithun	II	St Swithuns Road, Hempsted			15 December 1998	SO8137617021; 51°51′05″N 2°16′18″W		1271740	Upload Photo	Q26561657
Chest Tomb Approximately 5 Metres South of Chancel of Church of St Swithun	II	St Swithuns Road, Hempsted			15 December 1998	SO8136917025; 51°51′05″N 2°16′19″W		1271739	Upload Photo	Q26561656
Church Farmhouse	II	St Swithuns Road, Hempsted			15 December 1998	SO8140816957; 51°51′03″N 2°16′17″W		1271737	Upload Photo	Q26561654
Group of 3 Chest Tombs Approximately 1.5 Metres South East of Church of St Swithun	II	St Swithuns Road, Hempsted			15 December 1998	SO8138117030; 51°51′06″N 2°16′18″W		1271741	Upload Photo	Q26561658
Our Ladys Well (within Field Aprroximately 350 Metres West of Road	I	St Swithuns Road	holy well		10 January 1955	SO8144717323; 51°51′15″N 2°16′15″W		1271744	Our Ladys Well (within Field Aprroximately 350 Metres West of Road More images	Q17526033
Village Cross (at Corner of Rea Lane)	II*	St Swithuns Road, Hempsted	high cross		10 January 1955	SO8146716949; 51°51′03″N 2°16′14″W		1271745	Village Cross (at Corner of Rea Lane) More images	Q17537721
5 and 7, Stroud Road	II	5 and 7, Stroud Road			12 March 1973	SO8285717757; 51°51′29″N 2°15′01″W		1271785	Upload Photo	Q26561695
13 and 15, Stroud Road	II	13 and 15, Stroud Road			12 March 1973	SO8287417732; 51°51′28″N 2°15′00″W		1271786	Upload Photo	Q26561696
23-33, Stroud Road	II	23-33, Stroud Road			12 March 1973	SO8288617693; 51°51′27″N 2°15′00″W		1271787	Upload Photo	Q26561697
Gothic Cottages Numbers 1 and 2	II	257 and 259, Stroud Road			12 March 1973	SO8356116622; 51°50′53″N 2°14′24″W		1271788	Upload Photo	Q26561698
333, Stroud Road	II	333, Stroud Road, Tuffley	house		12 March 1973	SO8338315323; 51°50′11″N 2°14′33″W		1271789	333, Stroud Road More images	Q26561699
Church of St Barnabas and Boundary Walls	II*	Stroud Road, Tuffley, GL1 5LJ	church building		9 March 1982	SO8339315810; 51°50′26″N 2°14′33″W		1271790	Church of St Barnabas and Boundary Walls More images	Q17537731
Second World War Memorial, Church of St Barnabas	II	Stroud Road, Tuffley			29 May 2014	SO8340215777; 51°50′25″N 2°14′32″W		1420087	Upload Photo	Q26676775
War Memorial at the Church of St Paul and St Stephen	II	Stroud Road, GL1 5AL			14 May 2014	SO8322717352; 51°51′16″N 2°14′42″W		1418993	Upload Photo	Q26676691
Albert Warehouse	II	The Docks			12 March 1973	SO8277818268; 51°51′46″N 2°15′05″W		1271791	Upload Photo	Q26561700
Alexandra Warehouse	II	The Docks	warehouse		12 March 1973	SO8260818218; 51°51′44″N 2°15′14″W		1271792	Alexandra Warehouse More images	Q26561701
Biddles Warehouse	II	The Docks			12 March 1973	SO8269518225; 51°51′44″N 2°15′10″W		1245597	Upload Photo	Q26538113
City Flour Mills	II	The Docks			12 March 1973	SO8284918413; 51°51′51″N 2°15′02″W		1245598	Upload Photo	Q26538114
Dock Company Office	II	The Docks			12 March 1973	SO8280818427; 51°51′51″N 2°15′04″W		1245599	Upload Photo	Q26538115
Drinking Fountain on West Side of North Gate	II	The Docks			15 December 1998	SO8277918438; 51°51′51″N 2°15′05″W		1245600	Upload Photo	Q26538116
Dry Dock North of Engine House	II	The Docks			12 March 1973	SO8260518290; 51°51′47″N 2°15′14″W		1245601	Upload Photo	Q26538117
Dry Dock South of Engine House Including Crane	II	The Docks			12 March 1973	SO8259818249; 51°51′45″N 2°15′15″W		1245602	Upload Photo	Q26538118
Foxs Malthouse	II	The Docks			12 March 1973	SO8258918201; 51°51′44″N 2°15′15″W		1245603	Upload Photo	Q26538119
Gloucester Lock	II	The Docks			12 March 1973	SO8269718433; 51°51′51″N 2°15′10″W		1245604	Upload Photo	Q26538120
Herbert Warehouse	II	The Docks			12 March 1973	SO8278518382; 51°51′50″N 2°15′05″W		1245605	Upload Photo	Q26538121
Kimberley Warehouse	II	The Docks			12 March 1973	SO8277818368; 51°51′49″N 2°15′05″W		1245606	Upload Photo	Q26538122
Llanthony Warehouse	II	The Docks	warehouse		14 December 1971	SO8269018172; 51°51′43″N 2°15′10″W		1245607	Llanthony Warehouse More images	Q26538123
Lock Warehouse	II	The Docks			12 March 1973	SO8267918428; 51°51′51″N 2°15′11″W		1245608	Upload Photo	Q26538124
Mariners Chapel	II	The Docks	chapel		12 March 1973	SO8273718239; 51°51′45″N 2°15′08″W		1245609	Mariners Chapel More images	Q26538125
North Warehouse	II	The Docks			12 March 1973	SO8274018427; 51°51′51″N 2°15′07″W		1245466	Upload Photo	Q26538001
Phillpotts Warehouse	II	The Docks			12 March 1973	SO8276918352; 51°51′49″N 2°15′06″W		1245467	Upload Photo	Q26538002
Shiptons Warehouse	II	The Docks			12 March 1973	SO8270718221; 51°51′44″N 2°15′09″W		1245468	Upload Photo	Q26538003
Sturges Warehouse	II	The Docks			12 March 1973	SO8271618257; 51°51′45″N 2°15′09″W		1245469	Upload Photo	Q26538004
Victoria Warehouse	II	The Docks			12 March 1973	SO8282518360; 51°51′49″N 2°15′03″W		1245470	Upload Photo	Q26538005
Vinings Warehouse	II	The Docks			12 March 1973	SO8272718277; 51°51′46″N 2°15′08″W		1245471	Upload Photo	Q26538006
Cell Block (debtors' Prison) Former Her Majesty's Prison Gloucester	II	The Quay			12 March 1973	SO8284518540; 51°51′55″N 2°15′02″W		1245472	Upload Photo	Q26538007
Central Block (wings A & B and Chapel) Former Her Majesty's Prison Gloucester	II*	The Quay			12 March 1973	SO8280718537; 51°51′55″N 2°15′04″W		1245474	Upload Photo	Q67655566
Old Custom House	II	The Quay	house		23 January 1952	SO8272418764; 51°52′02″N 2°15′08″W		1245477	Old Custom House More images	Q26538011
Outer Gatehouse, Former Her Majesty's Prison Gloucester	II	The Quay			12 March 1973	SO8281818593; 51°51′56″N 2°15′03″W		1245475	Upload Photo	Q26538009
Perimeter Wall on the East Side of the Former Her Majesty's Prison Gloucester	II	The Quay			12 March 1973	SO8284518540; 51°51′55″N 2°15′02″W		1245476	Upload Photo	Q26538010
The Sheephouse	II	162, Tuffley Avenue			12 March 1973	SO8320816104; 51°50′36″N 2°14′43″W		1245478	Upload Photo	Q26538012
Cathedral Treasury, Vestry and Library	I	Vestry And Library, Cathedral Precincts			23 January 1952	SO8313318803; 51°52′03″N 2°14′47″W		1245956	Upload Photo	Q17525930
Number 2 to 8 and Attached Area Railings	II	2-8, Wellington Parade			23 January 1952	SO8367518753; 51°52′02″N 2°14′19″W		1245479	Upload Photo	Q26538013
Picton House	II	Wellington Parade			23 January 1952	SO8369318719; 51°52′01″N 2°14′18″W		1245437	Upload Photo	Q26537977
6, Westgate Street	II*	6, Westgate Street, GL1 2NL			12 March 1973	SO8315318590; 51°51′56″N 2°14′46″W		1245438	Upload Photo	Q17537577
7, Westgate Street	II	7, Westgate Street			12 March 1973	SO8312818580; 51°51′56″N 2°14′47″W		1245439	Upload Photo	Q26537978
8, Westgate Street	II	8, Westgate Street			23 January 1952	SO8314918595; 51°51′56″N 2°14′46″W		1245440	Upload Photo	Q26537979
9, Westgate Street	II	9, Westgate Street			12 March 1973	SO8312418584; 51°51′56″N 2°14′47″W		1245441	Upload Photo	Q26537980
10, Westgate Street	II	10, Westgate Street			12 March 1973	SO8314418600; 51°51′57″N 2°14′46″W		1245442	Upload Photo	Q26537981
11, Westgate Street	II	11, Westgate Street, GL1 2NW			12 March 1973	SO8311818589; 51°51′56″N 2°14′48″W		1245443	Upload Photo	Q26537982
13, Westgate Street	II	13, Westgate Street, GL1 2NW			10 December 1973	SO8311418593; 51°51′56″N 2°14′48″W		1245444	Upload Photo	Q26537983
14, Westgate Street	II*	14, Westgate Street, GL1 2NL			23 January 1952	SO8314218610; 51°51′57″N 2°14′46″W		1245445	Upload Photo	Q17537581
15, Westgate Street	II	15, Westgate Street, GL1 2NW			12 March 1973	SO8310918591; 51°51′56″N 2°14′48″W		1245446	Upload Photo	Q26537984
The Fleece Hotel, 19, 19a, and 21, Westgate Street	I	19, 19a, and 21, Westgate Street, GL1 2NW	hotel		23 January 1952	SO8309218586; 51°51′56″N 2°14′49″W		1245447	The Fleece Hotel, 19, 19a, and 21, Westgate Street More images	Q17525918
24, Westgate Street	II	24, Westgate Street			12 March 1973	SO8311818628; 51°51′57″N 2°14′48″W		1245449	Upload Photo	Q26537986
Old Judges House	I	26, Westgate Street	house		23 January 1952	SO8311218632; 51°51′58″N 2°14′48″W		1245450	Old Judges House More images	Q17525919
28, Westgate Street	II	28, Westgate Street			12 March 1973	SO8310718636; 51°51′58″N 2°14′48″W		1245453	Upload Photo	Q26537989
30, Westgate Street	II	30, Westgate StreetGL1 2NG			23 January 1952	SO8310118639; 51°51′58″N 2°14′49″W		1245454	Upload Photo	Q26537990
31, Westgate Street	II	31, Westgate Street			12 March 1973	SO8307918623; 51°51′57″N 2°14′50″W		1271924	Upload Photo	Q26561811
33, Westgate Street	II*	33, Westgate Street			12 March 1973	SO8307618626; 51°51′57″N 2°14′50″W		1271925	Upload Photo	Q17537735
39, Westgate Street	II	39, Westgate Street, GL1 2NW			12 March 1973	SO8306118634; 51°51′58″N 2°14′51″W		1271926	Upload Photo	Q26561812
41, Westgate Street	II	41, Westgate Street, GL1 2NW			12 March 1973	SO8305918637; 51°51′58″N 2°14′51″W		1271927	Upload Photo	Q26561813
43 and 45, Westgate Street (the Sword Inn)	II	43 and 45, Westgate Street, GL1 2NW	pub		12 March 1973	SO8305318641; 51°51′58″N 2°14′51″W		1271928	43 and 45, Westgate Street (the Sword Inn) More images	Q24023959
47 and 49, Westgate Street	II*	47 and 49, Westgate Street, GL1 2NW	building		23 January 1952	SO8304518649; 51°51′58″N 2°14′52″W		1271930	47 and 49, Westgate Street More images	Q17537739
Gloucester Services Club	II	52 and 54, Westgate Street			15 December 1998	SO8304418681; 51°51′59″N 2°14′52″W		1271931	Upload Photo	Q26561815
Fountain Inn	II	53, Westgate Street	pub		23 January 1952	SO8302018635; 51°51′58″N 2°14′53″W		1271932	Fountain Inn More images	Q20878136
55, Westgate Street	II	55, Westgate Street, GL1 2NW			12 March 1973	SO8303118659; 51°51′58″N 2°14′52″W		1271933	Upload Photo	Q26561817
56, Westgate Street	II	56, Westgate Street, GL1 2NF			12 March 1973	SO8303818687; 51°51′59″N 2°14′52″W		1271934	Upload Photo	Q26561818
57, Westgate Street	II	57, Westgate Street			23 January 1952	SO8302718663; 51°51′59″N 2°14′52″W		1271937	Upload Photo	Q26561820
60 and 62, Westgate Street	II	60 and 62, Westgate Street, GL1 2NZ			12 March 1973	SO8301518703; 51°52′00″N 2°14′53″W		1245226	60 and 62, Westgate Street More images	Q26537785
64, Westgate Street	II	64, Westgate Street, GL1 2NZ			23 January 1952	SO8300818705; 51°52′00″N 2°14′53″W		1245227	64, Westgate Street More images	Q26537786
66, Westgate Street	II*	66, Westgate Street, GL1 2NZ	building		23 January 1952	SO8300418708; 51°52′00″N 2°14′54″W		1245228	66, Westgate Street More images	Q17537568
70, Westgate Street	II	70, Westgate Street			23 January 1952	SO8299718715; 51°52′00″N 2°14′54″W		1245229	70, Westgate Street More images	Q26537787
74 and 76, Westgate Street	II*	74-76, Westgate Street, GL1 2NZ	building		10 December 1973	SO8298618725; 51°52′01″N 2°14′55″W		1245230	74 and 76, Westgate Street More images	Q17537571
78, Westgate Street	II	78, Westgate Street			12 March 1973	SO8297818729; 51°52′01″N 2°14′55″W		1245231	Upload Photo	Q26537788
80, Westgate Street	II	80, Westgate Street, GL1 2NZ			12 March 1973	SO8297418732; 51°52′01″N 2°14′55″W		1245232	Upload Photo	Q26537789
Old Crown Inn (east Side)	II	81, Westgate Street			12 March 1973	SO8292518732; 51°52′01″N 2°14′58″W		1245233	Upload Photo	Q26537790
82, Westgate Street	II	82, Westgate Street			12 March 1973	SO8297018734; 51°52′01″N 2°14′55″W		1245234	82, Westgate Street More images	Q26537791
Old Crown Inn (west Side)	II	83, Westgate Street			23 January 1952	SO8292118736; 51°52′01″N 2°14′58″W		1245235	Old Crown Inn (west Side) More images	Q26537792
84 and 86, Westgate Street	II	84 and 86, Westgate Street, GL1 2NZ			12 March 1973	SO8296418739; 51°52′01″N 2°14′56″W		1245236	84 and 86, Westgate Street More images	Q26537793
Hyatt House	II	91, Westgate Street			20 June 1957	SO8289418751; 51°52′01″N 2°14′59″W		1245237	Hyatt House More images	Q20878152
93 and 95, Westgate Street	II	93 and 95, Westgate Street			12 March 1973	SO8288418754; 51°52′02″N 2°15′00″W		1245070	93 and 95, Westgate Street More images	Q26537641
99-101 Westgate Street, Folk of Gloucester	II*	99-101 Westgate Street, GL1 2PG			23 January 1952	SO8287118765; 51°52′02″N 2°15′01″W		1245071	99-101 Westgate Street, Folk of Gloucester More images	Q17537555
Cider House in Rear Courtyard of the Folk of Gloucester	II	99-103 Westgate Street, GL1 2PG			15 December 1998	SO8285718712; 51°52′00″N 2°15′01″W		1245072	Upload Photo	Q26537642
Dick Whittington Tavern, 100 Westgate Street	I	100, Westgate Street, GL1 2PE	pub		23 January 1952	SO8292618771; 51°52′02″N 2°14′58″W		1245074	Dick Whittington Tavern, 100 Westgate Street More images	Q17525916
103 Westgate Street, Folk of Gloucester	II*	103 Westgate Street, GL1 2PG			23 January 1952	SO8286618757; 51°52′02″N 2°15′01″W		1245075	103 Westgate Street, Folk of Gloucester More images	Q17537559
109 and 111, Westgate Street	II	109 and 111, Westgate Street			23 January 1952	SO8284118779; 51°52′02″N 2°15′02″W		1245076	109 and 111, Westgate Street More images	Q26537644
113 and 115, Westgate Street	II	113 and 115, Westgate Street			23 January 1952	SO8283318783; 51°52′02″N 2°15′03″W		1245078	113 and 115, Westgate Street More images	Q26537646
117 and 119, Westgate Street	II	117 and 119, Westgate Street			23 January 1952	SO8282618786; 51°52′03″N 2°15′03″W		1245079	117 and 119, Westgate Street More images	Q26537647
Lower George Hotel	II	121, Westgate Street, GL1 2PG	hotel		23 January 1952	SO8282018789; 51°52′03″N 2°15′03″W		1245080	Lower George Hotel More images	Q20878170
123, Westgate Street	II	123, Westgate Street			23 January 1952	SO8281118792; 51°52′03″N 2°15′04″W		1245081	123, Westgate Street More images	Q26537649
Church of St Nicholas	I	Westgate Street, GL1 2PG	church building		23 January 1952	SO8290118778; 51°52′02″N 2°14′59″W		1245083	Church of St Nicholas More images	Q7594925
Pin Factory Annexe to Folk of Gloucester	II	Westgate Street, GL1 2PG			15 December 1998	SO8287118746; 51°52′01″N 2°15′01″W		1245073	Upload Photo	Q26537643
Shire Hall	II	Westgate Street	administrative building		23 January 1952	SO8297918682; 51°51′59″N 2°14′55″W		1245084	Shire Hall More images	Q20878142
Westgate Galleria	II	Westgate Street			23 January 1952	SO8260118954; 51°52′08″N 2°15′15″W		1245085	Upload Photo	Q20878274
Winnycroft Farmhouse	II	Winnycroft Lane, Matson			15 December 1998	SO8558214764; 51°49′53″N 2°12′38″W		1245086	Upload Photo	Q26537653
Winnycroft Farmhouse: Barn Approximately 20 Metres to West	II	Winnycroft Lane, Matson			15 December 1998	SO8555714748; 51°49′52″N 2°12′40″W		1245087	Upload Photo	Q26537654
Winnycroft Farmhouse: Cider House and Attached Byre to West	II	Winnycroft Lane, Matson			15 December 1998	SO8557214755; 51°49′52″N 2°12′39″W		1245088	Upload Photo	Q26537655
1, Worcester Street (see Details for Further Address Information)	II	1, Worcester Street			12 March 1973	SO8336318738; 51°52′01″N 2°14′35″W		1245717	Upload Photo	Q26538222
5, Worcester Street	II	5, Worcester Street			15 December 1998	SO8336118770; 51°52′02″N 2°14′35″W		1245089	Upload Photo	Q26537656
9-17, Worcester Street	II	9-17, Worcester Street			12 March 1973	SO8336218796; 51°52′03″N 2°14′35″W		1272051	Upload Photo	Q26561925
18, 20 and 22, Worcester Street	II	18, 20 and 22, Worcester Street			12 March 1973	SO8339918829; 51°52′04″N 2°14′33″W		1272052	Upload Photo	Q26561926
19, 21 and 23, Worcester Street	II	19, 21 and 23, Worcester Street			12 March 1973	SO8336618819; 51°52′04″N 2°14′35″W		1272053	Upload Photo	Q26561927
25, 27 and 29, Worcester Street	II	25, 27 and 29, Worcester Street			12 March 1973	SO8337318842; 51°52′04″N 2°14′34″W		1272054	Upload Photo	Q26561928
38-60, Worcester Street	II	38-60, Worcester Street			21 September 1998	SO8344218965; 51°52′08″N 2°14′31″W		1272055	Upload Photo	Q26561929
74 and 76, Worcester Street	II	74 and 76, Worcester Street			24 October 1997	SO8345119048; 51°52′11″N 2°14′30″W		1272056	Upload Photo	Q26561930

== See also ==
- Grade I listed buildings in Gloucestershire
- Grade II* listed buildings in Gloucestershire

== Sources ==
- Verey, David; Brooks, Alan (2002), Gloucestershire 2: The Vale and The Forest of Dean, The Buildings of England, New Haven and London: Yale University Press, ISBN 978-0-300-09733-7
