= Listed buildings in Tewkesbury =

Buildings in Tewkesbury, Gloucestershire, England

Tewkesbury is a town and civil parish in Gloucestershire, England. It contains 380 listed buildings that are recorded in the National Heritage List for England. Of these seven are grade I, 44 are grade II* and 329 are grade II.

This list is based on the information retrieved online from Historic England.

== Key ==
Grade	Criteria
I	Buildings that are of exceptional interest
II*	Particularly important buildings of more than special interest
II	Buildings that are of special interest

== Listing ==
Name	Grade	Location	Type	Completed (Note: The date given is the date used by Historic England as significant for the initial building or that of an important part in the structure's description.)	Date designated	Grid ref. (Note: The grid reference is based on the British national grid reference system, sometimes known as OSGB36, used by the Ordnance Survey.) Geo-coordinates	Notes	Entry number (Note: The "List Entry Number" is a unique number assigned to each listed building and scheduled monument by Historic England.)	Image	Wikidata
Barn Forming East Side of 3 Sided Yard Circa 100 Metres North East of Cowfield Farm	II				25 February 1987	SO9142034158; 52°00′21″N 2°07′35″W		1091353	Upload Photo	Q26383675
Pigsty, 10 Metres East of Cowfield Farm	II	10 Metres East Of Cowfield Farm			25 February 1987	SO9134434119; 52°00′20″N 2°07′39″W		1153081	Upload Photo	Q26445849
Healings Flour Mill and Warehouses	II	GL20 5BA	architectural structure		28 March 2019	SO8922332998; 51°59′43″N 2°09′30″W		1461284	Healings Flour Mill and Warehouses More images	Q66479983
Milestone	II	A438			25 February 1987	SO9109033176; 51°59′49″N 2°07′52″W		1091356	Upload Photo	Q26383678
Abbey Barn the Almonry	II	Abbey Precincts	barn		4 March 1952	SO8896032367; 51°59′23″N 2°09′44″W		1201160	Abbey Barn the Almonry More images	Q26496906
Abbey Church of St Mary	I	Abbey Precincts	church building		4 March 1952	SO8906732445; 51°59′25″N 2°09′38″W		1201159	Abbey Church of St Mary More images	Q3405514
Abbey Gatehouse	I	Abbey Precincts	gatehouse		4 March 1952	SO8897232381; 51°59′23″N 2°09′43″W		1201161	Abbey Gatehouse More images	Q4664008
Abbey House	I	Abbey Precincts	house		4 March 1952	SO8900332397; 51°59′24″N 2°09′42″W		1282807	Abbey House More images	Q17526424
Andrew Hoskins Monument Approximately 18 Metres North of North Porch Adjacent to Path	II	Abbey Precincts, Abbey Churchyard			25 April 1994	SO8902032453; 51°59′26″N 2°09′41″W		1282812	Upload Photo	Q26571724
Barber and Godsall Monuments	II	Abbey Precincts, Abbey Churchyard			25 April 1994	SO8897732446; 51°59′25″N 2°09′43″W		1281189	Upload Photo	Q26570258
Byrne Monument Approximately 2 Metres North of Nave Central Buttress	II	Abbey Precincts, Abbey Churchyard			25 April 1994	SO8904632451; 51°59′25″N 2°09′39″W		1282811	Upload Photo	Q26571723
Easthope Monument Approximately 2 Metres North of Nave Wall of Abbey Church	II	Abbey Precincts, Abbey Churchyard			25 April 1994	SO8904332444; 51°59′25″N 2°09′40″W		1201167	Easthope Monument Approximately 2 Metres North of Nave Wall of Abbey Church More images	Q26496911
Group of 6 Monuments Adjacent to Car Park Approximately 10 Metres from North East Corner of Abbey	II	Abbey Precincts, Abbey Churchyard			25 April 1994	SO8898532454; 51°59′26″N 2°09′43″W		1201172	Upload Photo	Q26496916
Group of Six Monuments by Hedge at South West End of Car Park	II	Abbey Precincts, Abbey Churchyard			25 April 1994	SO8896832435; 51°59′25″N 2°09′43″W		1282816	Upload Photo	Q26571728
Group of Three Monuments Approximately 20 Metres North of North Wall of Abbey Nave	II	Abbey Precincts, Abbey Churchyard			25 April 1994	SO8903532479; 51°59′26″N 2°09′40″W		1281116	Upload Photo	Q26570189
Healing Monument Approximately 3 Metres North of North Wall of Abbey House	II	Abbey Precincts, Abbey Churchyard			25 April 1994	SO8899732401; 51°59′24″N 2°09′42″W		1204534	Healing Monument Approximately 3 Metres North of North Wall of Abbey House More images	Q26499971
Mew and Unidentified Monuments Approximately 13 Metres North of North West Corner of Abbey Church	II	Abbey Precincts, Abbey Churchyard			25 April 1994	SO8901232440; 51°59′25″N 2°09′41″W		1201168	Upload Photo	Q26496912
Monastery Cottage	II	Abbey Precincts			4 March 1952	SO8895332348; 51°59′22″N 2°09′44″W		1282808	Upload Photo	Q26571721
Remains of Churchyard Cross	II	Abbey Precincts, Abbey Churchyard			27 July 1973	SO8902532444; 51°59′25″N 2°09′40″W		1204494	Upload Photo	Q26499934
Robert Smith Monument Approximately 15 Metres East of Banaster Monument	II	Abbey Precincts, Abbey Churchyard			25 April 1994	SO8899032422; 51°59′24″N 2°09′42″W		1201169	Upload Photo	Q26496913
Unidentified Monument Approximately 10 Metres North of North East Corner of Abbey Porch	II	Abbey Precincts, Abbey Churchyard			25 April 1994	SO8903432453; 51°59′26″N 2°09′40″W		1201173	Upload Photo	Q26496917
Unidentified Monument Approximately 12 Metres East of Abbey Churchyard Gates	II	Abbey Precincts, Abbey Churchyard			25 April 1994	SO8901732488; 51°59′27″N 2°09′41″W		1281131	Upload Photo	Q26570202
Unidentified Monument Approximately 4 Metres West of Path and 25 Metres North of Abbey North Porch	II	Abbey Precincts, Abbey Churchyard			25 April 1994	SO8901632454; 51°59′26″N 2°09′41″W		1201174	Upload Photo	Q26496918
Waldron Monument Approximately 15 Metres North of Central Buttress to Abbey Nave	II	Abbey Precincts, Abbey Churchyard			25 April 1994	SO8903732457; 51°59′26″N 2°09′40″W		1282814	Upload Photo	Q26571726
Welling Monument Approximately 13 Metres North of North East Corner of Abbey Porch	II	Abbey Precincts, Abbey Churchyard			25 April 1994	SO8903332458; 51°59′26″N 2°09′40″W		1201171	Upload Photo	Q26496915
William Proctor Monument Approximately 17 Metres West of North West Corner of Abbey Church	II	Abbey Precincts, Abbey Churchyard			25 April 1994	SO8900232423; 51°59′25″N 2°09′42″W		1282813	Upload Photo	Q26571725
William Tunnicliffe Monument by Abbey Lodge Wall Approximately 20 Metres South East of Car Park	II	Abbey Precincts, Abbey Churchyard			25 April 1994	SO8897132414; 51°59′24″N 2°09′43″W		1201170	Upload Photo	Q26496914
Williams Monument Approximately 3 1/2 Metres West of North West Corner of North Porch of Abbey	II	Abbey Precincts, Abbey Churchyard			25 April 1994	SO8902432442; 51°59′25″N 2°09′41″W		1282815	Upload Photo	Q26571727
Banaster Monument Approximately 10 Metres South East of Hedge to Car Park, Adjoining South West	II	Adjoining South West, Abbey Precincts, Abbey Churchyard			25 April 1994	SO8897232425; 51°59′25″N 2°09′43″W		1201166	Upload Photo	Q26496910
2, Back of Avon	II	2, Back Of Avon			27 July 1973	SO8925232947; 51°59′42″N 2°09′29″W		1204629	Upload Photo	Q26500052
Healings Warehouse	II	Back Of Avon			25 April 1994	SO8926932976; 51°59′42″N 2°09′28″W		1201175	Upload Photo	Q26496919
Barton Terrace	II	1 and 3, Barton Road	building		27 July 1973	SO8959232750; 51°59′35″N 2°09′11″W		1204640	Barton Terrace More images	Q26500062
Barton House	II	5, Barton Road			25 April 1994	SO8960132750; 51°59′35″N 2°09′10″W		1201176	Barton House More images	Q26496920
6-9, Barton Road	II	6-9, Barton Road			25 April 1994	SO8961432749; 51°59′35″N 2°09′10″W		1281107	6-9, Barton Road More images	Q26570182
1 and 2, Barton Street	II	1 and 2, Barton Street			4 March 1952	SO8929432694; 51°59′33″N 2°09′26″W		1201177	1 and 2, Barton Street More images	Q26496921
3, Barton Street	II	3, Barton Street			4 March 1952	SO8930032695; 51°59′33″N 2°09′26″W		1204721	3, Barton Street More images	Q26500138
4 Barton Street	II	4, Barton Street			27 July 1973	SO8930632697; 51°59′33″N 2°09′26″W		1201178	4 Barton Street More images	Q26496922
5, Barton Street	II	5, Barton Street			4 March 1952	SO8931432698; 51°59′33″N 2°09′25″W		1281065	5, Barton Street More images	Q26570144
6 Barton Street	II	6, Barton Street			4 March 1952	SO8931932699; 51°59′33″N 2°09′25″W		1204748	6 Barton Street More images	Q26500163
7, Barton Street	II	7, Barton Street			4 March 1952	SO8932532701; 51°59′34″N 2°09′25″W		1201179	7, Barton Street More images	Q26496923
No. 8, Barton Street	II	8, Barton Street			27 July 1973	SO8933332704; 51°59′34″N 2°09′24″W		1281036	No. 8, Barton Street More images	Q26570113
9 and 10, Barton Street	II	9 and 10, Barton Street	building		4 March 1952	SO8933932706; 51°59′34″N 2°09′24″W		1201180	9 and 10, Barton Street More images	Q26496924
11, Barton Street	II	11, Barton Street	building		4 March 1952	SO8934432706; 51°59′34″N 2°09′24″W		1204759	11, Barton Street More images	Q26500173
12, Barton Street	II	12, Barton Street			25 April 1994	SO8935132707; 51°59′34″N 2°09′23″W		1282817	12, Barton Street More images	Q26571729
The Mustard House	II	13 and 14, Barton Street	house		4 March 1952	SO8935732708; 51°59′34″N 2°09′23″W		1281040	The Mustard House More images	Q26570118
15, Barton Street	II	15, Barton Street	building		27 July 1973	SO8936432709; 51°59′34″N 2°09′23″W		1201181	15, Barton Street More images	Q26496925
16, Barton Street	II	16, Barton Street	building		4 March 1952	SO8936632709; 51°59′34″N 2°09′23″W		1281042	16, Barton Street More images	Q26570120
17, Barton Street	II	17, Barton Street	building		4 March 1952	SO8937332714; 51°59′34″N 2°09′22″W		1201182	17, Barton Street More images	Q26496926
21, Barton Street	II	21, Barton Street			4 March 1952	SO8940332720; 51°59′34″N 2°09′21″W		1204792	21, Barton Street More images	Q26500202
22 Barton Street	II*	22, Barton Street	building		4 March 1952	SO8940932718; 51°59′34″N 2°09′20″W		1204795	22 Barton Street More images	Q17539011
23, Barton Street	II	23, Barton Street			4 March 1952	SO8941832719; 51°59′34″N 2°09′20″W		1282818	23, Barton Street More images	Q26571730
Malthouse to Rear of Number 23	II*	Barton Street			4 March 1952	SO8941532738; 51°59′35″N 2°09′20″W		1281018	Upload Photo	Q17539438
24, Barton Street	II	24, Barton Street			4 March 1952	SO8942232725; 51°59′34″N 2°09′20″W		1201183	24, Barton Street More images	Q26496927
29, Barton Street	II	29, Barton Street			4 March 1952	SO8945232724; 51°59′34″N 2°09′18″W		1204825	29, Barton Street More images	Q26500233
30, Barton Street	II	30, Barton Street			4 March 1952	SO8945732724; 51°59′34″N 2°09′18″W		1282819	30, Barton Street More images	Q26571731
31, Barton Street	II	31, Barton Street			25 April 1994	SO8946032725; 51°59′34″N 2°09′18″W		1204827	31, Barton Street More images	Q26500234
32, Barton Street	II	32, Barton Street			4 March 1952	SO8946432725; 51°59′34″N 2°09′17″W		1201184	32, Barton Street More images	Q26496928
33 and 33a, Barton Street	II	33 and 33a, Barton Street	building		4 March 1952	SO8947032727; 51°59′34″N 2°09′17″W		1281031	33 and 33a, Barton Street More images	Q26570109
34, Barton Street	II	34, Barton Street			4 March 1952	SO8947732729; 51°59′34″N 2°09′17″W		1201185	34, Barton Street More images	Q26496929
35, Barton Street	II	35, Barton Street	building		4 March 1952	SO8948232730; 51°59′35″N 2°09′17″W		1204833	35, Barton Street More images	Q26500238
Tudor Cottage	II	36 and 37, Barton Street	house		4 March 1952	SO8949232734; 51°59′35″N 2°09′16″W		1282820	Tudor Cottage More images	Q26892728
38, Barton Street	II	38, Barton Street			4 March 1952	SO8950132736; 51°59′35″N 2°09′16″W		1280995	38, Barton Street More images	Q26570077
39, Barton Street	II	39, Barton Street			4 March 1952	SO8951232741; 51°59′35″N 2°09′15″W		1201186	39, Barton Street More images	Q26496930
The Kings Head	II	40 and 41, Barton Street			4 March 1952	SO8953032745; 51°59′35″N 2°09′14″W		1204840	The Kings Head More images	Q26500244
42 and 43, Barton Street	II	42 and 43, Barton Street			4 March 1952	SO8954032746; 51°59′35″N 2°09′13″W		1204845	42 and 43, Barton Street More images	Q26500249
44, Barton Street	II	44, Barton Street			4 March 1952	SO8954632748; 51°59′35″N 2°09′13″W		1282781	44, Barton Street More images	Q26571697
45, Barton Street	II	45, Barton Street			4 March 1952	SO8955132747; 51°59′35″N 2°09′13″W		1281000	45, Barton Street More images	Q26570082
46, Barton Street	II	46, Barton Street			25 April 1994	SO8955532750; 51°59′35″N 2°09′13″W		1201187	46, Barton Street More images	Q26496931
46a and 47, Barton Street	II	46a and 47, Barton Street			4 March 1952	SO8955832750; 51°59′35″N 2°09′13″W		1281002	46a and 47, Barton Street More images	Q26570084
48, Barton Street	II	48, Barton Street			4 March 1952	SO8956332752; 51°59′35″N 2°09′12″W		1282782	48, Barton Street More images	Q26571698
49a, Barton Street	II	49a, Barton Street			25 April 1994	SO8954432718; 51°59′34″N 2°09′13″W		1281008	49a, Barton Street More images	Q26570090
50, Barton Street	II	50, Barton Street	building		27 July 1973	SO8953632717; 51°59′34″N 2°09′14″W		1201188	50, Barton Street More images	Q26496932
51 and 52, Barton Street	II	51 and 52, Barton Street	building		27 July 1973	SO8952432719; 51°59′34″N 2°09′14″W		1204869	51 and 52, Barton Street More images	Q26500271
53, Barton Street	II	53, Barton Street			27 July 1973	SO8951832719; 51°59′34″N 2°09′15″W		1201189	53, Barton Street More images	Q26496933
54 Barton Street	II	54, Barton Street			27 July 1973	SO8951532709; 51°59′34″N 2°09′15″W		1282783	Upload Photo	Q26571699
Kingdom Hall, with Classroom Wing, and Boundary Railings with Gates	II	54a, Barton Street			27 July 1973	SO8950432694; 51°59′33″N 2°09′15″W		1201190	Kingdom Hall, with Classroom Wing, and Boundary Railings with Gates More images	Q26496934
57, Barton Street	II	57, Barton Street	building		4 March 1952	SO8947032706; 51°59′34″N 2°09′17″W		1282784	57, Barton Street More images	Q26571700
58, Barton Street	II	58, Barton Street			25 April 1994	SO8946432705; 51°59′34″N 2°09′17″W		1201191	58, Barton Street More images	Q26496936
59, Barton Street	II	59, Barton Street			4 March 1952	SO8946132704; 51°59′34″N 2°09′18″W		1201192	59, Barton Street More images	Q26496937
60, Barton Street	II	60, Barton Street			4 March 1952	SO8945632702; 51°59′34″N 2°09′18″W		1282785	60, Barton Street More images	Q26571701
61 and 61a, Barton Street	II	61 and 61a, Barton Street			25 April 1994	SO8945132703; 51°59′34″N 2°09′18″W		1201193	61 and 61a, Barton Street More images	Q26496938
62, Barton Street	II	62, Barton Street			25 April 1994	SO8944532699; 51°59′33″N 2°09′18″W		1282786	62, Barton Street More images	Q26571702
63, Barton Street	II	63, Barton Street			4 March 1952	SO8944032700; 51°59′34″N 2°09′19″W		1201194	63, Barton Street More images	Q26496939
Tewkesbury Museum and Attached Railings	II*	64, Barton Street	house		4 March 1952	SO8943432702; 51°59′34″N 2°09′19″W		1204935	Tewkesbury Museum and Attached Railings More images	Q17539027
65, Barton Street	II	65, Barton Street			25 April 1994	SO8942332695; 51°59′33″N 2°09′20″W		1201195	65, Barton Street More images	Q26496940
66, Barton Street	II	1, 2 and 3, Potters Court	building		25 April 1994	SO8941832694; 51°59′33″N 2°09′20″W		1280965	66, Barton Street More images	Q26570051
67, Barton Street	II	67, Barton Street			25 April 1994	SO8940932693; 51°59′33″N 2°09′20″W		1280955	67, Barton Street	Q26570042
68, Barton Street	II	68, Barton Street			4 March 1952	SO8940332693; 51°59′33″N 2°09′21″W		1282787	68, Barton Street More images	Q26571703
69 Barton Street	II	69, Barton Street			27 July 1973	SO8939632688; 51°59′33″N 2°09′21″W		1205010	69 Barton Street More images	Q26500396
71, Barton Street	II	71, Barton Street			25 April 1994	SO8938732688; 51°59′33″N 2°09′22″W		1280926	Upload Photo	Q26570014
74, Barton Street	II	74, Barton Street			25 April 1994	SO8936932687; 51°59′33″N 2°09′22″W		1201197	Upload Photo	Q26496941
75 Barton Street	II	75, Barton Street			4 March 1952	SO8936432681; 51°59′33″N 2°09′23″W		1280935	Upload Photo	Q26570023
76, Barton Street	II	76, Barton Street			25 April 1994	SO8935932684; 51°59′33″N 2°09′23″W		1201198	Upload Photo	Q26496942
77, Barton Street	II	77, Barton Street			4 March 1952	SO8934932683; 51°59′33″N 2°09′24″W		1205043	Upload Photo	Q26500428
Chapel Court	II	78, 79 and 80, Barton Street			4 March 1952	SO8934232681; 51°59′33″N 2°09′24″W		1201199	Upload Photo	Q26496943
81 and 82 Barton Street and 1 to 3 Mason's Court, Tewkesbury	II*	81 and 82, Barton Street1 and 1 to 3 Mason's Court, GL20 5PY			4 March 1952	SO8933632669; 51°59′33″N 2°09′24″W		1205058	Upload Photo	Q17539050
83, Barton Street	II	83, Barton Street			4 March 1952	SO8932832678; 51°59′33″N 2°09′25″W		1201200	Upload Photo	Q26496944
84 and 84a, Barton Street	II	84 and 84a, Barton Street			4 March 1952	SO8932232667; 51°59′32″N 2°09′25″W		1280739	Upload Photo	Q26569836
Plough Inn	II	85, Barton Street			4 March 1952	SO8931032671; 51°59′33″N 2°09′26″W		1205374	Upload Photo	Q26500722
Pound Cottage	II	Bredon Road			29 May 1994	SO8953333256; 51°59′52″N 2°09′14″W		1201201	Upload Photo	Q26496945
The Old Police Station and the Old Police Station Dental Practice	II	Bredon Road			29 April 1999	SO8951633241; 51°59′51″N 2°09′15″W		1386810	Upload Photo	Q26666492
Croft Cottage	II	2, Chandlers Court			29 May 1994	SO8900032544; 51°59′28″N 2°09′42″W		1205392	Upload Photo	Q26500738
4, Church Street	II	4, Church Street	building		27 July 1973	SO8927532648; 51°59′32″N 2°09′27″W		1282788	4, Church Street More images	Q26571704
Bicknor and Bicknor Cottage	II	5 and 5a, Church Street			27 July 1973	SO8927732630; 51°59′31″N 2°09′27″W		1280722	Upload Photo	Q26569823
6 Church Street	II	6, Church Street	building		4 March 1952	SO8927132645; 51°59′32″N 2°09′28″W		1201202	6 Church Street More images	Q26496946
7 Church Street	II	7, Church Street			4 March 1952	SO8926832642; 51°59′32″N 2°09′28″W		1205412	7 Church Street More images	Q26500753
Berkeley Arms and Outbuilding	II*	8, Church Street	pub		4 March 1952	SO8926832631; 51°59′31″N 2°09′28″W		1201203	Berkeley Arms and Outbuilding More images	Q17538633
Number 9 Including Yard Wall	II*	9, Church Street	building		4 March 1952	SO8925632635; 51°59′31″N 2°09′28″W		1280735	Number 9 Including Yard Wall More images	Q17539405
10, Church Street	II*	10, Church Street, GL20 5PA	building		4 March 1952	SO8925432630; 51°59′31″N 2°09′28″W		1282789	10, Church Street More images	Q17540617
11, Church Street	II	11, Church Street			4 March 1952	SO8924932629; 51°59′31″N 2°09′29″W		1280707	11, Church Street More images	Q26569810
12, Church Street	II	12, Church Street			4 March 1952	SO8924232623; 51°59′31″N 2°09′29″W		1201204	12, Church Street More images	Q26496947
13, Church Street	II	13, Church Street	building		4 March 1952	SO8923732619; 51°59′31″N 2°09′29″W		1280714	13, Church Street More images	Q26569816
14, Church Street	II	14, Church Street			4 March 1952	SO8923232615; 51°59′31″N 2°09′30″W		1282790	14, Church Street More images	Q26571705
15 and 16, Church Street	II*	15 and 16, Church Street	building		4 March 1952	SO8922932613; 51°59′31″N 2°09′30″W		1280681	15 and 16, Church Street More images	Q17539393
Sherford House	II	17, Church Street			4 March 1952	SO8922232608; 51°59′31″N 2°09′30″W		1205501	Sherford House More images	Q26500839
18, Church Street	II	18, Church Street			4 March 1952	SO8922232602; 51°59′30″N 2°09′30″W		1201205	18, Church Street More images	Q26496948
19, Church Street	II	19, Church Street			4 March 1952	SO8921432600; 51°59′30″N 2°09′31″W		1205505	19, Church Street More images	Q26500843
Abbeyfold	II	20, Church Street			4 March 1952	SO8921032599; 51°59′30″N 2°09′31″W		1201206	Abbeyfold More images	Q26496949
21, Church Street	II	21, Church Street			4 March 1952	SO8920632597; 51°59′30″N 2°09′31″W		1280693	Upload Photo	Q26569798
22 Church Street	II	22, Church Street			4 March 1952	SO8920132592; 51°59′30″N 2°09′31″W		1282791	Upload Photo	Q26571706
23 Church Street	II	23, Church Street			4 March 1952	SO8919532588; 51°59′30″N 2°09′32″W		1205535	23 Church Street More images	Q26500870
Avonbrook House	II	24, Church Street			27 July 1973	SO8920332562; 51°59′29″N 2°09′31″W		1201207	Upload Photo	Q26496950
Newton House	II*	26 and 27, Church Street			4 March 1952	SO8917532569; 51°59′29″N 2°09′33″W		1280642	Newton House More images	Q17539366
Crescent Cottage Newton Cottage	II	28, Church Street	cottage		4 March 1952	SO8916532566; 51°59′29″N 2°09′33″W		1282792	Crescent Cottage Newton Cottage More images	Q26571707
30, 31 and 32, Church Street	II	30, 31 and 32, Church Street	building		4 March 1952	SO8915832552; 51°59′29″N 2°09′33″W		1280649	30, 31 and 32, Church Street More images	Q26569759
Abbey Lawn Cottages	I	34-39, Church Street	cottage		4 March 1952	SO8910032540; 51°59′28″N 2°09′37″W		1201208	Abbey Lawn Cottages More images	Q17526393
40, Church Street	I	40, Church Street	house		4 March 1952	SO8908732536; 51°59′28″N 2°09′37″W		1205593	40, Church Street More images	Q17526413
Abbey Lawn Cottages	I	41-48, Church Street	cottage		4 March 1952	SO8906832530; 51°59′28″N 2°09′38″W		1201209	Abbey Lawn Cottages More images	Q17526401
Abbeyfield	II	49, Church Street			4 March 1952	SO8905532521; 51°59′28″N 2°09′39″W		1205617	Abbeyfield More images	Q26500937
Royal British Legion Club	I	50, Church Street	building		4 March 1952	SO8904532516; 51°59′28″N 2°09′39″W		1282793	Royal British Legion Club More images	Q17526419
Former National School	II	51, Church Street	school building		27 July 1973	SO8903932498; 51°59′27″N 2°09′40″W		1205636	Former National School More images	Q26500952
Bell Hotel	II*	52, Church Street	hotel		4 March 1952	SO8898632499; 51°59′27″N 2°09′43″W		1201210	Bell Hotel More images	Q17538636
53, Church Street	II	53, Church Street	building		4 March 1952	SO8899832514; 51°59′27″N 2°09′42″W		1282794	53, Church Street More images	Q26571708
54, Church Street	II	54, Church Street			4 March 1952	SO8900232517; 51°59′28″N 2°09′42″W		1201211	54, Church Street More images	Q26496951
55, Church Street	II	55, Church Street			4 March 1952	SO8900632518; 51°59′28″N 2°09′41″W		1282795	55, Church Street More images	Q26571709
56, Church Street	II	56, Church Street			4 March 1952	SO8900932520; 51°59′28″N 2°09′41″W		1201212	56, Church Street More images	Q26496952
57 and 58, Church Street	II	57 and 58, Church Street	building		4 March 1952	SO8901332523; 51°59′28″N 2°09′41″W		1201213	57 and 58, Church Street More images	Q26496953
59, Church Street	II	59, Church Street	building		4 March 1952	SO8901732527; 51°59′28″N 2°09′41″W		1282796	59, Church Street More images	Q26571710
60, Church Street	II	60, Church Street			4 March 1952	SO8902232528; 51°59′28″N 2°09′41″W		1201214	60, Church Street	Q26496954
61, Church Street	II	61, Church Street			4 March 1952	SO8902632533; 51°59′28″N 2°09′40″W		1282797	61, Church Street More images	Q26571711
62, Church Street	II	62, Church Street			4 March 1952	SO8903232534; 51°59′28″N 2°09′40″W		1280586	62, Church Street More images	Q26569705
Malt House at Rear of 62 Church Street	II	Church Street			27 July 1973	SO8902032557; 51°59′29″N 2°09′41″W		1201215	Upload Photo	Q26496955
63, Church Street	II	63, Church Street			4 March 1952	SO8903732537; 51°59′28″N 2°09′40″W		1280594	63, Church Street More images	Q26569712
64, Church Street	II	64, Church Street			4 March 1952	SO8904532539; 51°59′28″N 2°09′39″W		1201216	64, Church Street More images	Q26496956
Jessop House Hotel	II*	65, Church Street	hotel		4 March 1952	SO8904732543; 51°59′28″N 2°09′39″W		1205712	Jessop House Hotel More images	Q17539063
Abbey Hotel and Attached Boundary Wall to St Mary's Lane	II	66a, 67 and 68, Church Street			4 March 1952	SO8907932550; 51°59′29″N 2°09′38″W		1280555	Abbey Hotel and Attached Boundary Wall to St Mary's Lane More images	Q26569676
69, Church Street	II	69, Church Street			4 March 1952	SO8908732556; 51°59′29″N 2°09′37″W		1201217	69, Church Street More images	Q26496957
70 Church Street	II	70, Church Street			4 March 1952	SO8909232556; 51°59′29″N 2°09′37″W		1205799	70 Church Street More images	Q26501085
71, Church Street	II	71, Church Street			4 March 1952	SO8909332564; 51°59′29″N 2°09′37″W		1201218	71, Church Street More images	Q26496958
72, Church Street	II	72, Church Street			4 March 1952	SO8910132560; 51°59′29″N 2°09′36″W		1205808	72, Church Street More images	Q26501094
73, Church Street	II	73, Church Street	building		27 July 1973	SO8910332567; 51°59′29″N 2°09′36″W		1201219	73, Church Street More images	Q26496959
74, Church Street	II	74, Church Street			27 July 1973	SO8911232562; 51°59′29″N 2°09′36″W		1205816	74, Church Street More images	Q26501101
75 Church Street	II	75, Church Street			27 July 1973	SO8911632568; 51°59′29″N 2°09′36″W		1201220	75 Church Street More images	Q26496960
Number 77 Including Gate Piers	II*	77, Church Street			4 March 1952	SO8913532573; 51°59′29″N 2°09′35″W		1280534	Upload Photo	Q17539353
Gazebo to North of 77 Church Street	II	Church Street			27 July 1973	SO8912032618; 51°59′31″N 2°09′35″W		1201221	Upload Photo	Q26496961
78, Church Street	II	78, Church Street			4 March 1952	SO8913832580; 51°59′30″N 2°09′35″W		1205836	Upload Photo	Q26501120
79 and 80, Church Street	II	79 and 80, Church Street			4 March 1952	SO8914532581; 51°59′30″N 2°09′34″W		1280509	79 and 80, Church Street More images	Q26569637
81, Church Street	II	81, Church Street			4 March 1952	SO8915132584; 51°59′30″N 2°09′34″W		1201222	81, Church Street More images	Q26496962
Craik House	II*	82 and 83, Church Street	house		4 March 1952	SO8915832589; 51°59′30″N 2°09′34″W		1205867	Craik House More images	Q17539095
84, Church Street	II	84, Church Street			4 March 1952	SO8916332592; 51°59′30″N 2°09′33″W		1201223	84, Church Street More images	Q26496963
85 and 86, Church Street	II	85 and 86, Church Street			4 March 1952	SO8916732594; 51°59′30″N 2°09′33″W		1205881	85 and 86, Church Street More images	Q26501162
87, Church Street	II	87, Church Street			4 March 1952	SO8917032599; 51°59′30″N 2°09′33″W		1201224	87, Church Street More images	Q26496964
88 and 88a, Church Street	II*	88 and 88a, Church Street	building		4 March 1952	SO8917732603; 51°59′30″N 2°09′33″W		1205905	88 and 88a, Church Street More images	Q17539116
89 and 90, Church Street	II*	89 and 90, Church Street	building		4 March 1952	SO8918032606; 51°59′30″N 2°09′32″W		1201225	89 and 90, Church Street More images	Q17538639
91 and 92, Church Street	II*	91 and 92, Church Street	building		4 March 1952	SO8919232615; 51°59′31″N 2°09′32″W		1205919	91 and 92, Church Street More images	Q17539127
93, Church Street	II	93, Church Street			4 March 1952	SO8919432621; 51°59′31″N 2°09′32″W		1282799	93, Church Street More images	Q26571713
Royal Hop Pole Hotel	II*	94, Church Street	hotel		4 March 1952	SO8920532630; 51°59′31″N 2°09′31″W		1205936	Royal Hop Pole Hotel More images	Q28404714
Young Mens Christian Association	II*	97, Church Street	architectural structure		4 March 1952	SO8922032641; 51°59′32″N 2°09′30″W		1201226	Young Mens Christian Association More images	Q17538641
Rowland Hill House	II	98, Church Street			31 July 1970	SO8922732648; 51°59′32″N 2°09′30″W		1205967	Rowland Hill House More images	Q26501239
99, Church Street	II	99, Church Street			4 March 1952	SO8923532657; 51°59′32″N 2°09′29″W		1201227	99, Church Street More images	Q26496965
100, Church Street	II*	100, Church Street	building		4 March 1952	SO8924032661; 51°59′32″N 2°09′29″W		1280450	100, Church Street More images	Q17539328
Number 101 with Cottage to Rear	II	101, Church Street			4 March 1952	SO8924832665; 51°59′32″N 2°09′29″W		1280453	Number 101 with Cottage to Rear More images	Q26569588
105, Church Street	II	105, Church Street			4 March 1952	SO8925932684; 51°59′33″N 2°09′28″W		1282800	105, Church Street More images	Q26571714
106, Church Street	II	106, Church Street			4 March 1952	SO8926232691; 51°59′33″N 2°09′28″W		1280422	106, Church Street More images	Q26569560
Cross House	II*	107 and 108, Church Street	house		4 March 1952	SO8926432698; 51°59′33″N 2°09′28″W		1201228	Cross House More images	Q17565075
Churchyard Gates	II*	Church Street, Abbey Precincts	church gate		4 March 1952	SO8900832486; 51°59′27″N 2°09′41″W		1206025	Churchyard Gates More images	Q17539164
Russell Almshouses	II	Church Street, Abbey Precincts			27 July 1973	SO8906032486; 51°59′27″N 2°09′39″W		1282761	Upload Photo	Q26571679
St Mary's Cottage	II	Church Street, Abbey Precincts			27 July 1973	SO8913232526; 51°59′28″N 2°09′35″W		1206034	St Mary's Cottage More images	Q26501297
Walton House	II	Churchill Drive	house		4 August 1993	SO9089432908; 51°59′40″N 2°08′03″W		1201229	Walton House More images	Q26496966
Group of 5 Monuments, Dumble and Others, Approximately 6 Metres South of Cartland Memorial	II	Dumble And Others, Approximately 6 Metres South Of Cartland Memorial, Abbey Precincts, Abbey Churchyard			25 April 1994	SO8900432475; 51°59′26″N 2°09′42″W		1204529	Upload Photo	Q26499968
North East Terrace Oldbury Cottage	II	1-16, East Street	cottage		31 October 1989	SO8955232822; 51°59′37″N 2°09′13″W		1206048	North East Terrace Oldbury Cottage More images	Q26501310
Osborne House (15) Including Wall and Outbuilding	II	14, 15 and 16, East Street			31 October 1989	SO8953832792; 51°59′37″N 2°09′14″W		1201230	Upload Photo	Q26496967
17 and 18, East Street	II	17 and 18, East Street			31 October 1989	SO8955432792; 51°59′37″N 2°09′13″W		1280385	Upload Photo	Q26569526
22, 23 and 24, East Street	II	22, 23 and 24, East Street			27 July 1973	SO8956032776; 51°59′36″N 2°09′12″W		1282762	Upload Photo	Q26571680
25 and 26, East Street	II	25 and 26, East Street			27 July 1973	SO8954932775; 51°59′36″N 2°09′13″W		1206096	Upload Photo	Q26501356
32, 33 and 34, East Street	II	32, 33 and 34, East Street			27 July 1973	SO8948332770; 51°59′36″N 2°09′16″W		1201231	Upload Photo	Q26496968
7, Fletcher's Alley	II	7, Fletcher's Alley			27 July 1973	SO8936932645; 51°59′32″N 2°09′22″W		1206099	Upload Photo	Q26501360
Southwick Farm	II	Gloucester Farm			27 July 1973	SO8899230459; 51°58′21″N 2°09′42″W		1201238	Upload Photo	Q26496975
Abbey Cottages	II	1, 2 and 2a, Gloucester Road, Abbey Precincts			4 March 1952	SO8893832391; 51°59′23″N 2°09′45″W		1282768	Upload Photo	Q26571686
Abbey Lodge Including Boundary Walls	II	1 and 2, Gloucester Road			27 July 1973	SO8895732412; 51°59′24″N 2°09′44″W		1282763	Upload Photo	Q26571681
Abbey Terrace	II	1, Gloucester Road			12 July 1973	SO8890132390; 51°59′23″N 2°09′47″W		1201232	Upload Photo	Q26496969
Abbey Terrace	II	2 and 3, Gloucester Road			27 July 1973	SO8890032383; 51°59′23″N 2°09′47″W		1282764	Upload Photo	Q66477502
Abbey Terrace	II	4, Gloucester Road			27 July 1973	SO8889932376; 51°59′23″N 2°09′47″W		1201233	Upload Photo	Q26678864
Abbey Terrace	II	5-8, Gloucester Road			27 July 1973	SO8889432366; 51°59′23″N 2°09′47″W		1201234	Upload Photo	Q26889320
Abbey Terrace	II	9, Gloucester Road			27 July 1973	SO8889032356; 51°59′22″N 2°09′48″W		1282765	Upload Photo	Q66480459
Abbey Terrace	II	10, Gloucester Road			27 July 1973	SO8888832352; 51°59′22″N 2°09′48″W		1201235	Upload Photo	Q26889322
Abbey Terrace	II	11, Gloucester Road			27 July 1973	SO8888532345; 51°59′22″N 2°09′48″W		1282766	Upload Photo	Q66480460
Abbey Precinct Wall	II	Gloucester Road, Victoria Gardens			4 March 1952	SO8889632422; 51°59′24″N 2°09′47″W		1206289	Upload Photo	Q26501529
Anglican and Non-conformist Chapels at Tewkesbury Cemetery	II	Gloucester Road	chapel		24 February 2010	SO8912732001; 51°59′11″N 2°09′35″W		1393680	Anglican and Non-conformist Chapels at Tewkesbury Cemetery More images	Q26672828
Barn Range at Park Farmhouse	II	Gloucester Road			27 July 1973	SO8784630345; 51°58′17″N 2°10′42″W		1282767	Upload Photo	Q26571685
Gatehouse	II	Gloucester Road			25 April 1994	SO8888632041; 51°59′12″N 2°09′48″W		1201236	Upload Photo	Q26496973
Gubshill Manor Inn	II	Gloucester Road	inn		4 March 1952	SO8938131439; 51°58′53″N 2°09′22″W		1201237	Gubshill Manor Inn More images	Q26496974
Park Farmhouse	II	Gloucester Road			27 July 1973	SO8782630307; 51°58′16″N 2°10′43″W		1206223	Upload Photo	Q26501470
Stable Block at Park Farmhouse	II	Gloucester Road			25 April 1994	SO8786330320; 51°58′16″N 2°10′41″W		1206236	Upload Photo	Q26501482
Swilgate Bridge	II	Gloucester Road			25 April 1994	SO8885232223; 51°59′18″N 2°09′50″W		1280309	Upload Photo	Q26569459
Webber House	II	Gloucester Road			14 February 1985	SO8891432092; 51°59′14″N 2°09′46″W		1280322	Upload Photo	Q26569470
1, High Street	II*	1, High Street	house		4 March 1952	SO8926632710; 51°59′34″N 2°09′28″W		1201239	1, High Street More images	Q17538648
2, High Street	II*	2, High Street	building		4 March 1952	SO8926532720; 51°59′34″N 2°09′28″W		1280304	2, High Street More images	Q17539315
6, High Street	II	6, High Street			4 March 1952	SO8927432742; 51°59′35″N 2°09′27″W		1201240	6, High Street More images	Q26496976
7, High Street	II	7, High Street			4 March 1952	SO8927632747; 51°59′35″N 2°09′27″W		1280269	7, High Street More images	Q26569424
8, High Street	II	8, High Street			4 March 1952	SO8927832754; 51°59′35″N 2°09′27″W		1201241	8, High Street More images	Q26496977
Golden Key House	II*	9, High Street	house		4 March 1952	SO8927532760; 51°59′35″N 2°09′27″W		1206326	Golden Key House More images	Q17539188
Former Swan Hotel	II	10, High Street	hotel		4 March 1952	SO8928132772; 51°59′36″N 2°09′27″W		1201242	Former Swan Hotel More images	Q26496978
No.11 and Midland Bank	II	11, High Street			4 March 1952	SO8928532793; 51°59′37″N 2°09′27″W		1206342	No.11 and Midland Bank More images	Q26501578
The Old Fleece	II*	12, High Street	architectural structure		4 March 1952	SO8929032798; 51°59′37″N 2°09′27″W		1201243	The Old Fleece More images	Q17538650
13, High Street	II	13, High Street			25 April 1994	SO8929132803; 51°59′37″N 2°09′27″W		1280250	13, High Street More images	Q26569406
14, High Street	II	14, High Street			4 March 1952	SO8928332808; 51°59′37″N 2°09′27″W		1201244	14, High Street More images	Q26496979
15, High Street	II*	15, High Street	building		4 March 1952	SO8929232812; 51°59′37″N 2°09′27″W		1206372	15, High Street More images	Q17539202
16, High Street	II	16, High Street			4 March 1952	SO8929332818; 51°59′37″N 2°09′26″W		1206381	Upload Photo	Q26501606
17, High Street	II	17, High Street			4 March 1952	SO8929432825; 51°59′38″N 2°09′26″W		1201245	17, High Street More images	Q26496980
Town Hall	II*	18, High Street	city hall		4 March 1952	SO8929232835; 51°59′38″N 2°09′27″W		1206399	Town Hall More images	Q17539216
Lloyds Bank and Bank House	II	19, High Street	bank building		25 April 1994	SO8929732850; 51°59′38″N 2°09′26″W		1201246	Lloyds Bank and Bank House More images	Q26496981
21, High Street	II	21, High Street			4 March 1952	SO8929932856; 51°59′39″N 2°09′26″W		1206421	21, High Street More images	Q26501640
22, High Street	II	22, High Street			4 March 1952	SO8930232862; 51°59′39″N 2°09′26″W		1201247	22, High Street More images	Q26496982
23 and 24 High Street	II	23 and 24, High Street			4 March 1952	SO8929832872; 51°59′39″N 2°09′26″W		1206430	23 and 24 High Street More images	Q26501648
25, High Street	II	25, High Street			4 March 1952	SO8930832875; 51°59′39″N 2°09′26″W		1282769	25, High Street More images	Q26571687
Britannia Inn	II	30, High Street	pub		4 March 1952	SO8931332897; 51°59′40″N 2°09′25″W		1206441	Britannia Inn More images	Q26501657
35, High Street	II	35, High Street			4 March 1952	SO8932232932; 51°59′41″N 2°09′25″W		1201248	35, High Street More images	Q26496983
36, High Street	II	36, High Street	building		4 March 1952	SO8932332940; 51°59′41″N 2°09′25″W		1206445	36, High Street More images	Q26501661
Nortonbury House and Nortonbury Cottage	II	37, High Street	cottage		4 March 1952	SO8932532947; 51°59′42″N 2°09′25″W		1201249	Nortonbury House and Nortonbury Cottage More images	Q26496984
38, High Street	II	38, High Street			4 March 1952	SO8932632954; 51°59′42″N 2°09′25″W		1280126	Upload Photo	Q26569297
39 and 40, High Street	II*	39 and 40, High Street	building		4 March 1952	SO8933332961; 51°59′42″N 2°09′24″W		1282770	39 and 40, High Street More images	Q17539472
No. 41, High Street	II	41, High Street			4 March 1952	SO8933432971; 51°59′42″N 2°09′24″W		1206617	No. 41, High Street More images	Q26501819
Green's	II	42, High Street	pub		4 March 1952	SO8934332991; 51°59′43″N 2°09′24″W		1206624	Green's More images	Q26501825
43 and 44, High Street	II	43 and 44, High Street			4 March 1952	SO8934833002; 51°59′43″N 2°09′24″W		1201250	43 and 44, High Street More images	Q26496985
45 High Street	II	45, High Street			4 March 1952	SO8935133007; 51°59′43″N 2°09′23″W		1206674	45 High Street	Q26501871
46, High Street	II	46, High Street			4 March 1952	SO8935133015; 51°59′44″N 2°09′23″W		1206682	46, High Street More images	Q26501879
47 and 48, High Street	II	47 and 48, High Street			4 March 1952	SO8935433022; 51°59′44″N 2°09′23″W		1282771	47 and 48, High Street More images	Q26571688
49 and 49a, High Street	II	49 and 49a, High Street			4 March 1952	SO8935433026; 51°59′44″N 2°09′23″W		1201251	49 and 49a, High Street More images	Q26496986
50 High Street	II	50, High Street			4 March 1952	SO8935733033; 51°59′44″N 2°09′23″W		1206691	50 High Street More images	Q26501888
51, High Street	II	51, High Street			4 March 1952	SO8936333038; 51°59′44″N 2°09′23″W		1201252	Upload Photo	Q26496987
Tudor Hotel	II*	52, High Street	hotel		4 March 1952	SO8936533048; 51°59′45″N 2°09′23″W		1280099	Tudor Hotel More images	Q17539288
The Brothers Public House	II	54, High Street			4 March 1952	SO8937933073; 51°59′46″N 2°09′22″W		1187708	Upload Photo	Q26482891
56 and 57, High Street	II	56 and 57, High Street	building		4 March 1952	SO8937633084; 51°59′46″N 2°09′22″W		1201253	56 and 57, High Street More images	Q26496988
58 and 59, High Street	II	58 and 59, High Street			4 March 1952	SO8938033094; 51°59′46″N 2°09′22″W		1282773	Upload Photo	Q26571690
60, High Street	II	60, High Street			4 March 1952	SO8938933098; 51°59′46″N 2°09′21″W		1201254	Upload Photo	Q26496989
61, High Street	II	61, High Street			4 March 1952	SO8938533106; 51°59′47″N 2°09′22″W		1282774	Upload Photo	Q26571691
62, High Street	II	62, High Street			4 March 1952	SO8939033112; 51°59′47″N 2°09′21″W		1201255	Upload Photo	Q26496990
Avonside	II*	63, High Street	building		4 March 1952	SO8939033121; 51°59′47″N 2°09′21″W		1201256	Avonside More images	Q17538890
Trafalgar House	II	65, High Street			27 July 1973	SO8940633142; 51°59′48″N 2°09′21″W		1282775	Upload Photo	Q26571692
66, High Street	II	66, High Street, GL20 5BJ	building		27 July 1973	SO8940533152; 51°59′48″N 2°09′21″W		1201257	66, High Street More images	Q26496991
67, High Street	II	67, High Street			25 April 1994	SO8941333162; 51°59′48″N 2°09′20″W		1282776	Upload Photo	Q26571693
69, High Street	II	69, High Street			4 March 1952	SO8944033158; 51°59′48″N 2°09′19″W		1201258	Upload Photo	Q26496992
70, High Street	II	70, High Street			4 March 1952	SO8943833150; 51°59′48″N 2°09′19″W		1355128	Upload Photo	Q26638008
71, High Street	II	71, High Street			4 March 1952	SO8943333141; 51°59′48″N 2°09′19″W		1201259	Upload Photo	Q26496993
72, High Street	II	72, High Street	building		4 March 1952	SO8943933137; 51°59′48″N 2°09′19″W		1355154	72, High Street More images	Q26638034
73, High Street	II	73, High Street			4 March 1952	SO8942933128; 51°59′47″N 2°09′19″W		1282777	Upload Photo	Q26571694
74, High Street	II	74, High Street			4 March 1952	SO8942833123; 51°59′47″N 2°09′19″W		1025093	Upload Photo	Q26276334
75 and 76, High Street	II	75 and 76, High Street			4 March 1952	SO8942433114; 51°59′47″N 2°09′20″W		1201260	Upload Photo	Q26496994
77 and 78, High Street	II	77 and 78, High Street			4 March 1952	SO8942233107; 51°59′47″N 2°09′20″W		1025065	Upload Photo	Q26276306
Hereford House	II	79, High Street	house		4 March 1952	SO8942033099; 51°59′46″N 2°09′20″W		1282778	Hereford House More images	Q26571695
104, High Street	II	104, High Street			4 March 1952	SO8936432965; 51°59′42″N 2°09′23″W		1025076	Upload Photo	Q26276316
105, High Street	II	105, High Street			4 March 1952	SO8936232959; 51°59′42″N 2°09′23″W		1201261	Upload Photo	Q26496995
106, High Street	II	106, High Street			4 March 1952	SO8935932953; 51°59′42″N 2°09′23″W		1355175	Upload Photo	Q26638048
107, High Street	II	107, High Street			4 March 1952	SO8935932950; 51°59′42″N 2°09′23″W		1201262	Upload Photo	Q26496996
108, High Street	II	108, High Street			4 March 1952	SO8936132947; 51°59′42″N 2°09′23″W		1025054	Upload Photo	Q26275896
111, High Street	II	111, High Street			4 March 1952	SO8935432935; 51°59′41″N 2°09′23″W		1025056	Upload Photo	Q26275899
116 High Street	II	116, High Street			27 July 1973	SO8934732902; 51°59′40″N 2°09′24″W		1201263	Upload Photo	Q26496997
117 and 118, High Street	II	117 and 118, High Street			27 July 1973	SO8934632897; 51°59′40″N 2°09′24″W		1025019	Upload Photo	Q26275862
119, High Street	II	119, High Street			27 July 1973	SO8934832890; 51°59′40″N 2°09′24″W		1201264	Upload Photo	Q26496998
120, High Street	II	120, High Street			27 July 1973	SO8933432880; 51°59′39″N 2°09′24″W		1025035	120, High Street More images	Q26275880
121, High Street	II	121, High Street			4 March 1952	SO8933232874; 51°59′39″N 2°09′24″W		1201265	Upload Photo	Q26496999
122, High Street	II	122, High Street			4 March 1952	SO8933032868; 51°59′39″N 2°09′25″W		1025004	Upload Photo	Q26275847
123, High Street	II	123, High Street			4 March 1952	SO8932932862; 51°59′39″N 2°09′25″W		1201266	Upload Photo	Q26497000
Auriol House	II	124, High Street	house		4 March 1952	SO8933632853; 51°59′38″N 2°09′24″W		1025009	Auriol House More images	Q26275852
125, High Street	II	125, High Street			27 July 1973	SO8932732849; 51°59′38″N 2°09′25″W		1201267	Upload Photo	Q26497001
126, High Street	II	126, High Street			25 April 1994	SO8932432842; 51°59′38″N 2°09′25″W		1024983	Upload Photo	Q26275827
127, High Street	II	127, High Street			27 July 1973	SO8932932834; 51°59′38″N 2°09′25″W		1201268	Upload Photo	Q26497002
128, High Street	II	128, High Street			4 March 1952	SO8932032827; 51°59′38″N 2°09′25″W		1355189	Upload Photo	Q26637868
Nottingham Arms	II*	129, High Street	pub		4 March 1952	SO8931932823; 51°59′38″N 2°09′25″W		1201269	Nottingham Arms More images	Q17538904
3, Walls Court (see Details for Further Address Information)	II	130, High Street			4 March 1952	SO8932832814; 51°59′37″N 2°09′25″W		1187201	Upload Photo	Q26482424
131, High Street	II	131, High Street			4 March 1952	SO8931732811; 51°59′37″N 2°09′25″W		1187173	Upload Photo	Q26482396
132, High Street	II*	132, High Street	building		4 March 1952	SO8932032803; 51°59′37″N 2°09′25″W		1282779	132, High Street More images	Q17540606
135, High Street	II*	135, High Street	building		4 March 1952	SO8930932789; 51°59′36″N 2°09′26″W		1372300	135, High Street More images	Q17541004
136, High Street	II	136, High Street			4 March 1952	SO8930832784; 51°59′36″N 2°09′26″W		1201270	Upload Photo	Q26497003
137, High Street	II*	137, High Street			4 March 1952	SO8930732780; 51°59′36″N 2°09′26″W		1052263	Upload Photo	Q17538459
138 and 139 High Street	II	138 and 139, High Street			4 March 1952	SO8930732771; 51°59′36″N 2°09′26″W		1201271	Upload Photo	Q26497004
Clarence House	II*	140, High Street	house		4 March 1952	SO8931032762; 51°59′36″N 2°09′26″W		1052276	Clarence House More images	Q17538461
141, High Street	II	141, High Street			4 March 1952	SO8930032759; 51°59′35″N 2°09′26″W		1282780	Upload Photo	Q26571696
142 and 143, High Street	II	142 and 143, High Street, GL20 5PF			4 March 1952	SO8930332751; 51°59′35″N 2°09′26″W		1052212	Upload Photo	Q26304012
144 and 145, High Street	II	144 and 145, High Street			25 April 1994	SO8930732740; 51°59′35″N 2°09′26″W		1201272	Upload Photo	Q26497005
147, High Street	II	147, High Street			4 March 1952	SO8929232731; 51°59′35″N 2°09′26″W		1298824	Upload Photo	Q26586270
148 and 149, High Street	II	148 and 149, High Street			27 July 1973	SO8929132723; 51°59′34″N 2°09′27″W		1282741	Upload Photo	Q26571660
150, High Street	II	150, High Street			4 March 1952	SO8928932718; 51°59′34″N 2°09′27″W		1187221	Upload Photo	Q26482445
151, High Street	II	151, High Street			4 March 1952	SO8928932715; 51°59′34″N 2°09′27″W		1201273	Upload Photo	Q26497006
152, High Street	II	152, High Street			4 March 1952	SO8928832712; 51°59′34″N 2°09′27″W		1187323	Upload Photo	Q26482539
153, High Street	II	153, High Street			4 March 1952	SO8929132706; 51°59′34″N 2°09′27″W		1187330	153, High Street More images	Q26482546
154, High Street	II*	154, High Street	building		4 March 1952	SO8928632702; 51°59′34″N 2°09′27″W		1201274	154, High Street More images	Q17538916
155, High Street	II*	155, High Street	building		4 March 1952	SO8928532698; 51°59′33″N 2°09′27″W		1282742	155, High Street More images	Q17539453
156, High Street	II	156, High Street			4 March 1952	SO8928632691; 51°59′33″N 2°09′27″W		1201275	156, High Street More images	Q26497007
Boundary Walls and Gateway to Tudor Hotel	II	High Street			27 July 1973	SO8937833062; 51°59′45″N 2°09′22″W		1282772	Upload Photo	Q26571689
Outbuilding to Rear of Number 67	II	High Street			27 July 1973	SO8939733171; 51°59′49″N 2°09′21″W		1025104	Upload Photo	Q26275911
Graham Court	II	2, Hollams Road			25 April 1994	SO8952833093; 51°59′46″N 2°09′14″W		1279721	Upload Photo	Q26568917
Runnymede, King John's Cottages, with Attached Stable	II	King John's Cottages, With Attached Stable, 1, Mythe Road			27 July 1973	SO8940533215; 51°59′50″N 2°09′21″W		1207402	Upload Photo	Q26502551
Tudor Cottage	II	1, Lilley's Alley	house		4 March 1952	SO8926832620; 51°59′31″N 2°09′28″W		1282743	Tudor Cottage More images	Q26683379
Claypipes	II	3, Lilley's Alley			27 July 1973	SO8927532606; 51°59′30″N 2°09′27″W		1201276	Upload Photo	Q26497008
Lincoln Green Farmhouse and Attached Outbuilding	II	Lincoln Green Lane			27 July 1973	SO8896231577; 51°58′57″N 2°09′44″W		1201277	Upload Photo	Q26497009
Tewkesbury Park Hotel	II	Lincoln Green Lane			27 July 1973	SO8821531167; 51°58′44″N 2°10′23″W		1282744	Upload Photo	Q26571662
1 and 2, Mill Bank	II*	1 and 2, Mill Bank	building		4 March 1952	SO8894632556; 51°59′29″N 2°09′45″W		1201278	1 and 2, Mill Bank More images	Q17538932
4, Mill Bank	II	4, Mill Bank			4 March 1952	SO8895132560; 51°59′29″N 2°09′44″W		1282745	Upload Photo	Q26571663
Emms Cottage	II	5, Mill Bank			4 March 1952	SO8895332563; 51°59′29″N 2°09′44″W		1201279	Upload Photo	Q26497010
Pump Cottage	II	6, Mill Bank			4 March 1952	SO8895532566; 51°59′29″N 2°09′44″W		1187267	Upload Photo	Q26482484
7, Mill Bank	II	7, Mill Bank			4 March 1952	SO8895732568; 51°59′29″N 2°09′44″W		1282746	Upload Photo	Q26571664
9 Mill Bank Including Privy	II	9, Mill Bank			4 March 1952	SO8895532575; 51°59′29″N 2°09′44″W		1187270	Upload Photo	Q26482487
10, Mill Bank	II	10, Mill Bank			27 July 1973	SO8896232569; 51°59′29″N 2°09′44″W		1298779	Upload Photo	Q26586230
11, 12 and 13 Mill Bank	II	11, 12 and 13, Mill Bank, GL20 5SD			27 July 1973	SO8897332569; 51°59′29″N 2°09′43″W		1201281	Upload Photo	Q26497012
Boundary Wall from Folly Cottage to Numbers 11, 12 and 13 Mill Bank	II	12 and 13 Mill Bank, Mill Bank			25 April 1994	SO8896832593; 51°59′30″N 2°09′43″W		1282754	Upload Photo	Q26571672
Raised Pavement to Front of Numbers 1 to 9	II	Mill Bank			25 April 1994	SO8894732565; 51°59′29″N 2°09′45″W		1201280	Upload Photo	Q26497011
1, Mill Street	II	1, Mill Street			4 March 1952	SO8899532516; 51°59′28″N 2°09′42″W		1187382	Upload Photo	Q26482593
2, Mill Street	II	2, Mill Street			4 March 1952	SO8898932516; 51°59′28″N 2°09′42″W		1282747	Upload Photo	Q26571665
3, Mill Street	II	3, Mill Street			4 March 1952	SO8898532518; 51°59′28″N 2°09′43″W		1187387	Upload Photo	Q26482597
4, Mill Street	II	4, Mill Street			4 March 1952	SO8898332522; 51°59′28″N 2°09′43″W		1201282	Upload Photo	Q26497013
7 Mill Street	II	7, Mill Street, GL20 5SB			4 March 1952	SO8897932523; 51°59′28″N 2°09′43″W		1187395	Upload Photo	Q26482605
8 and 9, Mill Street	II	8 and 9, Mill Street			4 March 1952	SO8897132529; 51°59′28″N 2°09′43″W		1282748	Upload Photo	Q26571666
11, Mill Street	II	11, Mill Street			4 March 1952	SO8896832532; 51°59′28″N 2°09′43″W		1187366	Upload Photo	Q26482578
12 and 13, Mill Street	II	12 and 13, Mill Street			4 March 1952	SO8895232542; 51°59′28″N 2°09′44″W		1187375	Upload Photo	Q26482586
Roshine and Abbey Mill Cottage	II	15, Mill Street, GL20 5SB			4 March 1952	SO8894632547; 51°59′29″N 2°09′45″W		1187378	Upload Photo	Q26482589
Abbey Barn	II	Mill Street			27 July 1973	SO8893432508; 51°59′27″N 2°09′45″W		1187342	Upload Photo	Q26482558
Abbey Mill	II*	Mill Street, River Avon	mill		4 March 1952	SO8891732544; 51°59′28″N 2°09′46″W		1201285	Abbey Mill More images	Q17538958
Raised Pavement to Front of Numbers 12 to 15	II	Mill Street			25 April 1994	SO8894232543; 51°59′28″N 2°09′45″W		1201284	Upload Photo	Q26497015
Stonemason's Yard	II	11a, Mill Street			27 July 1973	SO8896032538; 51°59′28″N 2°09′44″W		1201283	Upload Photo	Q26497014
1, Mythe Road	II	1, Mythe Road			4 March 1952	SO8943233198; 51°59′50″N 2°09′19″W		1207375	Upload Photo	Q26502530
King John's Cottages	II	2 and 3, Mythe Road			27 July 1973	SO8941133208; 51°59′50″N 2°09′20″W		1201288	Upload Photo	Q26497017
The Stables	II	2, Mythe Road			4 March 1952	SO8942733199; 51°59′50″N 2°09′19″W		1201286	Upload Photo	Q26497016
King John's Cottages	II	4, Mythe Road			27 July 1973	SO8941833204; 51°59′50″N 2°09′20″W		1207409	Upload Photo	Q26678955
Black Bear Inn	II*	Mythe Road	pub		4 March 1952	SO8940733177; 51°59′49″N 2°09′21″W		1207382	Black Bear Inn More images	Q17539229
King John's Bridge	II*	Mythe Road	bridge		4 March 1952	SO8937133231; 51°59′51″N 2°09′22″W		1201287	King John's Bridge More images	Q17538983
10 and 11 Nelson Street	II	10 and 11, Nelson Street			27 July 1973	SO8940332728; 51°59′34″N 2°09′21″W		1201289	10 and 11 Nelson Street More images	Q26497018
1, Old Baptist Chapel Court	II	1, Old Baptist Chapel Court			4 March 1952	SO8903532546; 51°59′29″N 2°09′40″W		1207418	Upload Photo	Q26502568
2 and 3, Old Baptist Chapel Court	II	2 and 3, Old Baptist Chapel Court			4 March 1952	SO8903132553; 51°59′29″N 2°09′40″W		1201290	Upload Photo	Q26497019
Old Baptist Chapel	II*	Old Baptist Chapel Court	chapel		4 March 1952	SO8902832562; 51°59′29″N 2°09′40″W		1207425	Old Baptist Chapel More images	Q17539244
Mitton Farmhouse	II	Old Manor Lane, Mitton			27 July 1973	SO9036633851; 52°00′11″N 2°08′30″W		1282749	Upload Photo	Q26571667
Gothic Cottage	II	28, Oldbury Road			27 July 1973	SO8950333147; 51°59′48″N 2°09′15″W		1207444	Upload Photo	Q26502590
Church of Holy Trinity	II	Oldbury Road	church building		27 July 1973	SO8944432881; 51°59′39″N 2°09′19″W		1201291	Church of Holy Trinity More images	Q26497020
Sheep Market Office	II	Oldbury Road			25 April 1994	SO8947733026; 51°59′44″N 2°09′17″W		1207491	Upload Photo	Q26502634
2, 3 and 4, Orchard Court	II	2, 3 and 4, Orchard Court			27 July 1973	SO8952132696; 51°59′33″N 2°09′14″W		1207504	Upload Photo	Q26502647
Orchard Cottage Orchard Court	II	Orchard Court			27 July 1973	SO8952432713; 51°59′34″N 2°09′14″W		1282750	Orchard Cottage Orchard Court More images	Q26571668
Gazebo Adjacent to River Avon	II	Post Office Lane			10 January 1991	SO8915132735; 51°59′35″N 2°09′34″W		1201292	Upload Photo	Q26497021
2, Quay Street	II	2, Quay Street			27 July 1973	SO8930432994; 51°59′43″N 2°09′26″W		1207516	Upload Photo	Q26502660
Iron Bridge	II	Quay Street	bridge		27 July 1973	SO8924832991; 51°59′43″N 2°09′29″W		1201293	Iron Bridge More images	Q26497022
Boundary Wall Adjacent to Gazebo at Rear of Number 51 High Street	II	Red Lane			27 July 1973	SO8931233045; 51°59′45″N 2°09′25″W		1282751	Upload Photo	Q26571669
Gazebo to Garden of Number 51 Gazebo to Garden of Number 51 High Street	II	Red Lane			27 July 1973	SO8931933052; 51°59′45″N 2°09′25″W		1279671	Upload Photo	Q26568872
Warehouse Opposite Clarke's Alley	II	Red Lane			25 April 1994	SO8929933039; 51°59′44″N 2°09′26″W		1207539	Upload Photo	Q26502684
Boundary Wall, South of Church of St Mary	II	South Of Church Of St Mary, Abbey Precincts			25 April 1994	SO8906032411; 51°59′24″N 2°09′39″W		1282806	Upload Photo	Q26571720
2, St Mary's Lane	II	2, St Mary's Lane	building		4 March 1952	SO8918532617; 51°59′31″N 2°09′32″W		1201294	2, St Mary's Lane More images	Q26497023
6, St Mary's Lane	II	6, St Mary's Lane	building		27 July 1973	SO8915632636; 51°59′31″N 2°09′34″W		1207559	6, St Mary's Lane More images	Q26502704
7 St Mary's Lane	II	7, St Mary's Lane			27 July 1973	SO8915132641; 51°59′32″N 2°09′34″W		1282752	Upload Photo	Q26571670
16 and 18, St Mary's Lane	II	16 and 18, St Mary's Lane			27 July 1973	SO8906432590; 51°59′30″N 2°09′38″W		1201295	Upload Photo	Q26497024
28, 30 and 32, St Mary's Lane	II	28, 30 and 32, St Mary's Lane			27 July 1973	SO8905232571; 51°59′29″N 2°09′39″W		1282753	Upload Photo	Q26571671
34, St Mary's Lane	II	34, St Mary's Lane			27 July 1973	SO8905432561; 51°59′29″N 2°09′39″W		1201296	Upload Photo	Q26497025
66, Church Street (see Details for Further Address Information)	II	36, St Mary's Lane	building		4 March 1952	SO8905632547; 51°59′29″N 2°09′39″W		1282798	66, Church Street (see Details for Further Address Information) More images	Q26571712
Tewkesbury Boat Centre	II	St Mary's Lane			27 July 1973	SO8907332622; 51°59′31″N 2°09′38″W		1201297	Upload Photo	Q26497026
1, Stephens Alley	II	1, Stephens Alley			27 July 1973	SO8945133144; 51°59′48″N 2°09′18″W		1201298	Upload Photo	Q26497027
Footbridge Over River Swilgate	II	Swilgate Road			27 July 1973	SO8938732583; 51°59′30″N 2°09′21″W		1282755	Upload Photo	Q26571673
War Memorial	II	The Cross, Church Street	war memorial		27 July 1973	SO8927632673; 51°59′33″N 2°09′27″W		1201299	War Memorial More images	Q26497028
Carriage House Approximately 60 Metres West of the Mythe	II	A38, The Mythe			25 April 1994	SO8908733928; 52°00′13″N 2°09′37″W		1201164	Upload Photo	Q26496908
King John's Castle	II*	A38, The Mythe	house		4 March 1952	SO8890634119; 52°00′19″N 2°09′47″W		1201162	King John's Castle More images	Q17538630
Mythe Bridge	II*	A438, The Mythe	bridge		4 March 1952	SO8887333737; 52°00′07″N 2°09′49″W		1282810	Mythe Bridge More images	Q13528012
Mythe Court Southern Mythe Court	II	A38, The Mythe			27 July 1973	SO8892434024; 52°00′16″N 2°09′46″W		1201163	Upload Photo	Q26496907
The Mythe	II	A38, The Mythe	English country house		27 July 1973	SO8915833918; 52°00′13″N 2°09′34″W		1282809	The Mythe More images	Q7752968
Toll House at East End of Mythe Bridge	II	A438, The Mythe	tollhouse		27 July 1973	SO8892533750; 52°00′07″N 2°09′46″W		1204474	Toll House at East End of Mythe Bridge More images	Q26499915
Turnpike Shelter at East End of Mythe Bridge	II	A438, The Mythe			27 July 1973	SO8892233734; 52°00′07″N 2°09′46″W		1201165	Upload Photo	Q26496909
Uplands Residential Home	II	A38, The Mythe	architectural structure		25 April 1994	SO8927834051; 52°00′17″N 2°09′27″W		1204423	Uplands Residential Home More images	Q26499868
1 Tolsey Lane	II	1, Tolsey Lane, GL20 5AE			27 July 1973	SO8922732728; 51°59′34″N 2°09′30″W		1201300	Upload Photo	Q26497029
4, Tolzey Lane	II	4, Tolzey Lane			27 July 1973	SO8922632743; 51°59′35″N 2°09′30″W		1279647	Upload Photo	Q26568850
Tolsey Hall	II	Tolzey Lane	house		25 April 1994	SO8923932719; 51°59′34″N 2°09′29″W		1282756	Tolsey Hall More images	Q26571674
Tudor Cottage	II	6, Trinity Street	house		27 July 1973	SO8934932872; 51°59′39″N 2°09′24″W		1207658	Tudor Cottage More images	Q26502798
Lucia House	II	Trinity Street			27 July 1973	SO8937332899; 51°59′40″N 2°09′22″W		1201301	Upload Photo	Q26497030
3, Turners Court	II	3, Turners Court			25 April 1994	SO8914232621; 51°59′31″N 2°09′34″W		1366070	Upload Photo	Q26647702
Water Tower, with Boundary Railings and Gates	II	With Boundary Railings And Gates, A38, The Mythe			10 October 1985	SO8898034414; 52°00′29″N 2°09′43″W		1204425	Upload Photo	Q26499870

== See also ==
- Grade I listed buildings in Gloucestershire
- Grade II* listed buildings in Gloucestershire

== Sources ==
- Verey, David; Brooks, Alan (2002), Gloucestershire 2: The Vale and The Forest of Dean, The Buildings of England, New Haven and London: Yale University Press, ISBN 978-0-300-09733-7
