= Grade I listed buildings in Stroud (district) =

Gloucestershire shown in England

There are over 9,000 Grade I listed buildings in England. This page is a list of these buildings in the district of Stroud in Gloucestershire.

== Stroud ==
Name	Location	Type	Completed (Note: The date given is the date used by Historic England as significant for the initial building or that of an important part in the structure's description.)	Date designated	Grid ref. (Note: The grid reference is based on the British national grid reference system, sometimes known as OSGB36, used by the Ordnance Survey.) Geo-coordinates	Entry number (Note: The "List Entry Number" is a unique number assigned to each listed building and scheduled monument by Historic England.)	Image
Church of St Mary	Arlingham	Church	14th century	10 January 1955	SO7065410658; 51°47′38″N 2°25′37″W	1340704	Church of St Mary More images
Berkeley Castle	Berkeley	Castle	Late 11th century	21 October 1952	ST6845899091; 51°41′23″N 2°27′28″W	1340692	Berkeley Castle More images
Church of St Mary the Virgin	Berkeley	Church	19th century	30 March 1960	ST6847099031; 51°41′21″N 2°27′27″W	1304581	Church of St Mary the Virgin More images
Berkeley Castle Gatehouse	Berkeley	Gatehouse	14th century	9 September 1985	ST6844898994; 51°41′20″N 2°27′28″W	1304604	Berkeley Castle Gatehouse
Tower of Church of St Mary	Berkeley	Bell Tower	15th century	30 March 1960	ST6845899091; 51°41′23″N 2°27′28″W	1090634	Tower of Church of St Mary More images
Daneway House	Daneway, Bisley-with-Lypiatt	Cross Passage House	Mid-late 14th century	28 June 1960	SO9409703638; 51°43′53″N 2°05′13″W	1303397	Daneway House More images
Lypiatt Park	Bisley-with-Lypiatt	House	Mid 16th century	28 June 1960	SO8858705852; 51°45′04″N 2°10′00″W	1155735	Lypiatt Park More images
Lypiatt Park Dovecote	Bisley-with-Lypiatt	Dovecote	Medieval	28 June 1960	SO8852405874; 51°45′05″N 2°10′04″W	1155792	Lypiatt Park Dovecote
Lypiatt Park Granary	Bisley-with-Lypiatt	Granary	1960	28 June 1960	SO8853605875; 51°45′05″N 2°10′03″W	1091274	Lypiatt Park Granary
Nether Lypiatt Manor including Forecourt Walls, Gateways and Clairvoyee	Nether Lypiatt, Brimscombe and Thrupp	House	1710-17	21 October 1955	SO8739103798; 51°43′58″N 2°11′02″W	1152395	Nether Lypiatt Manor including Forecourt Walls, Gateways and Clairvoyee More images
St George's Church	Cam	Church	13th century	30 June 1961	ST7573699343; 51°41′32″N 2°21′09″W	1340962	St George's Church More images
Church of St James	Dursley	Church	13th century	1 December 1986	ST7569298114; 51°40′53″N 2°21′11″W	1290832	Church of St James More images
Church of St John the Baptist	Elmore	Church	13th century	10 January 1955	SO7671714920; 51°49′57″N 2°20′21″W	1340600	Church of St John the Baptist More images
Frampton Court	Frampton on Severn	House	18th century	10 January 1955	SO7500607837; 51°46′07″N 2°21′49″W	1153928	Frampton Court More images
Manor Farmhouse	Frampton on Severn	House	Early 16th century	10 January 1955	SO7480507980; 51°46′12″N 2°21′59″W	1154192	Manor Farmhouse More images
Barn at Manor Farm	Frampton on Severn	Barn	15th century	10 January 1955	SO7484408003; 51°46′12″N 2°21′57″W	1090538	Barn at Manor Farm More images
Orangery or Gothick Garden House	Frampton on Severn	Orangery	Mid 18th century	10 January 1955	SO7504408002; 51°46′12″N 2°21′47″W	1153988	Orangery or Gothick Garden House More images
Frocester Court Tithe Barn	Frocester	Barn	c. 1300	10 January 1955	SO7863402942; 51°43′29″N 2°18′39″W	1340418	Frocester Court Tithe Barn More images
Wanswell Court Farmhouse	Wanswell, Hamfallow	Farmhouse	Early 16th century	21 October 1952	SO6906301049; 51°42′26″N 2°26′57″W	1237928	Wanswell Court Farmhouse More images
Church of St Nicholas	Hardwicke	Church	13th century	10 January 1955	SO7936412433; 51°48′37″N 2°18′03″W	1340591	Church of St Nicholas More images
Church of All Saints	Selsley West, King's Stanley	Church	1862	28 June 1960	SO8291703807; 51°43′58″N 2°14′56″W	1090729	Church of All Saints More images
Church of St George	King's Stanley	Church	12th century	28 June 1960	SO8100104096; 51°44′07″N 2°16′35″W	1090720	Church of St George More images
Main Building at Stanley Mills	Ryeford, King's Stanley	Mill	c. 1825	28 June 1960	SO8118404242; 51°44′12″N 2°16′26″W	1171285	Main Building at Stanley Mills More images
Kingswood Abbey	5 & 7, Abbey St, Kingswood	Abbey	Early 16th century	23 June 1952	ST7469892035; 51°37′36″N 2°22′01″W	1238029	Upload Photo
Kingswood Abbey Gatehouse and adjoining wall	Kingswood	Abbey	Early 16th century	23 June 1952	ST7471092031; 51°37′35″N 2°22′00″W	1238022	Kingswood Abbey Gatehouse and adjoining wall
Church of St Swithin	Leonard Stanley	Church	12th century	28 June 1960	SO8023103260; 51°43′40″N 2°17′15″W	1171487	Church of St Swithin More images
Church of St Lawrence	Longney Village, Longney and Epney	Church	13th century	10 January 1955	SO7638012435; 51°48′36″N 2°20′38″W	1090797	Church of St Lawrence More images
Church of the Holy Trinity	Minchinhampton	Church	1842	28 June 1960	SO8721900814; 51°42′21″N 2°11′11″W	1340467	Church of the Holy Trinity More images
Church of St Stephen	Moreton Valence	Church	12th century	10 January 1955	SO7795309719; 51°47′08″N 2°19′16″W	1340346	Church of St Stephen More images
Owlpen Manor	Owlpen	House	Mid 16th century	23 June 1952	ST7999498370; 51°41′01″N 2°17′27″W	1152317	Owlpen Manor More images
Beacon House	Painswick	House	1766	21 October 1955	SO8663309729; 51°47′10″N 2°11′43″W	1152614	Beacon House More images
Church of St Mary	Painswick	Church	12th century	21 October 1955	SO8665909643; 51°47′07″N 2°11′41″W	1090990	Church of St Mary More images
Painswick Court House	Painswick	House	16th century	21 October 1955	SO8667209562; 51°47′04″N 2°11′41″W	1091005	Upload Photo
Painswick House	Painswick	House	1737	21 October 1955	SO8633910468; 51°47′34″N 2°11′58″W	1153435	Painswick House More images
Painswick Lodge	Painswick	House	14th century	21 October 1955	SO8808910788; 51°47′44″N 2°10′27″W	1172571	Painswick Lodge More images
Church of St John the Evangelist	Slimbridge	Church	Early 13th century	30 June 1961	SO7403803564; 51°43′49″N 2°22′38″W	1305799	Church of St John the Evangelist More images
Church of St Nicholas	Standish	Church	Early 14th century	10 January 1955	SO8007408415; 51°46′27″N 2°17′25″W	1303221	Church of St Nicholas More images
Church of All Saints	Uplands	Church	1907-1910	25 June 1974	SO8562905689; 51°44′59″N 2°12′34″W	1340939	Church of All Saints More images
Prinknash Abbey	Prinknash Park, Upton St. Leonards	Abbey	Mid-late 15th century	10 January 1955	SO8783713239; 51°49′04″N 2°10′40″W	1154946	Prinknash Abbey More images
Old Priory	North Woodchester, Woodchester	House	c. 1580	28 June 1960	SO8393403170; 51°43′37″N 2°14′02″W	1340695	Upload Photo
Woodchester Mansion	Woodchester	House	19th century	28 June 1960	SO8090201384; 51°42′39″N 2°16′40″W	1340703	Woodchester Mansion More images
Church of St Mary	Wotton-under-Edge	Church	Late 13th century	30 June 1961	ST7601993430; 51°38′21″N 2°20′53″W	1052363	Church of St Mary More images
Church of Our Lady of the Annunciation	Woodchester	Church	1846-49	23 January 1985	SO8416101060; 51°42′29″N 2°13′50″W	1340700	Church of Our Lady of the Annunciation More images
