= Listed buildings in Stow-on-the-Wold =

Buildings in Stow-on-the-Wold, Gloucestershire, England

Stow-on-the-Wold is a town and civil parish in Gloucestershire, England. It contains 118 listed buildings that are recorded in the National Heritage List for England. Of these one is grade I, four are grade II* and 113 are grade II.

This list is based on the information retrieved online from Historic England.

== Key ==
Grade	Criteria
I	Buildings that are of exceptional interest
II*	Particularly important buildings of more than special interest
II	Buildings that are of special interest

== Listing ==
Name	Grade	Location	Type	Completed (Note: The date given is the date used by Historic England as significant for the initial building or that of an important part in the structure's description.)	Date designated	Grid ref. (Note: The grid reference is based on the British national grid reference system, sometimes known as OSGB36, used by the Ordnance Survey.) Geo-coordinates	Notes	Entry number (Note: The "List Entry Number" is a unique number assigned to each listed building and scheduled monument by Historic England.)	Image	Wikidata
Bottle Kiln	II	Chapel Street			29 April 1983	SP1953825801; 51°55′49″N 1°43′02″W		1342053	Upload Photo	Q26626100
Huntingdon Antiques (south Extension) Premises of Manuel Restaurant	II	Church Street			29 April 1983	SP1910725705; 51°55′46″N 1°43′25″W		1078376	Upload Photo	Q26348114
Huntingdon Antiques, Premises on Corner Opposite Churchyard Entry	II	Church Street			29 April 1983	SP1911425718; 51°55′47″N 1°43′24″W		1170321	Upload Photo	Q26463696
Churchyard Boundary Wall Fronting Road with 2 Archways, Gatepiers and Gates to Churchyard	II	Church Street			29 April 1983	SP1911625731; 51°55′47″N 1°43′24″W		1342054	Upload Photo	Q26626101
John Blockley Gallery and Adjoining Gallery	II	Church Street			29 April 1983	SP1908925696; 51°55′46″N 1°43′26″W		1342056	Upload Photo	Q26626103
Masonic Hall	II*	Church Street	Masonic temple		25 August 1960	SP1909925723; 51°55′47″N 1°43′25″W		1078374	Masonic Hall More images	Q17535873
Pair of Bale Tombs Immediately North West of Church	II	Church Street			29 April 1983	SP1906925771; 51°55′48″N 1°43′27″W		1342055	Upload Photo	Q26626102
Pair of Table Tombs 15 Yards North West of Church	II	Church Street			29 April 1983	SP1905525771; 51°55′48″N 1°43′27″W		1078370	Upload Photo	Q26348090
Parish Church of St Edward	I	Church Street	church building		25 August 1960	SP1909225758; 51°55′48″N 1°43′25″W		1078369	Parish Church of St Edward More images	Q7593009
Premises of Cripps and Wood and Premises of Huntingdon Antiques Adjacent	II	Church Street			29 April 1983	SP1912325719; 51°55′47″N 1°43′24″W		1078375	Upload Photo	Q26348112
The Flower Girl	II	Church Street			29 April 1983	SP1907825680; 51°55′46″N 1°43′26″W		1078371	Upload Photo	Q26348095
The Fruit Basket	II	Church Street			29 April 1983	SP1908225686; 51°55′46″N 1°43′26″W		1078372	Upload Photo	Q26348101
The Salad Bowl	II	Church Street			29 April 1983	SP1914125712; 51°55′47″N 1°43′23″W		1342058	Upload Photo	Q26626105
White Cottage	II	Church Street			29 April 1983	SP1909925712; 51°55′47″N 1°43′25″W		1342057	Upload Photo	Q26626104
Woodward Brothers	II	Church Street			29 April 1983	SP1909425703; 51°55′46″N 1°43′25″W		1078373	Upload Photo	Q26348106
Digbeth House	II	Digbeth Street, Stow On The Wold, GL54 1BN			29 April 1983	SP1925225705; 51°55′46″N 1°43′17″W		1088801	Upload Photo	Q26381214
Mother Hubbard's Cupboard, Part of Top of the Hill	II	Digbeth Street			29 April 1983	SP1920025720; 51°55′47″N 1°43′20″W		1342017	Upload Photo	Q26626070
North Cotswold Standard and Purdeys of Stow	II	Digbeth Street			29 April 1983	SP1925525687; 51°55′46″N 1°43′17″W		1342018	Upload Photo	Q26626071
Page's Bakery	II	Digbeth Street			25 August 1960	SP1920925733; 51°55′47″N 1°43′19″W		1088802	Upload Photo	Q26381215
Premises to West of Harkers	II	Digbeth Street			29 April 1983	SP1924225688; 51°55′46″N 1°43′18″W		1078377	Upload Photo	Q26348119
Roy Mangen, Saddlery	II	Digbeth Street			25 August 1960	SP1921725728; 51°55′47″N 1°43′19″W		1341611	Upload Photo	Q26625693
Stuart House	II	Digbeth Street			29 April 1983	SP1920625716; 51°55′47″N 1°43′20″W		1170346	Upload Photo	Q26463745
The Royalist Hotel	II*	Digbeth Street	hotel		25 August 1960	SP1929225692; 51°55′46″N 1°43′15″W		1170376	The Royalist Hotel More images	Q17536553
Cox-Newman, Gannicott and Townsend (solicitors)	II	The Square			25 August 1960	SP1912625781; 51°55′49″N 1°43′24″W		1341602	Cox-Newman, Gannicott and Townsend (solicitors) More images	Q26625684
George Cottage	II	George Alley			25 August 1960	SP1909525879; 51°55′52″N 1°43′25″W		1171133	Upload Photo	Q26464957
Drinking Fountain and Horse Trough	II	High Street			29 April 1983	SP1907126005; 51°55′56″N 1°43′27″W		1341615	Upload Photo	Q26625697
K6 Telephone Kiosk	II	High Street			13 December 2000	SP1907126010; 51°55′56″N 1°43′27″W		1389130	Upload Photo	Q26668573
Police Station and Magistrates' Court	II	High Street			29 April 1983	SP1909025904; 51°55′53″N 1°43′26″W		1341614	Upload Photo	Q26625696
Summer House in Garden of Fosseway House and Boundary Wall Linking It to Road.	II	High Street			29 April 1983	SP1916925971; 51°55′55″N 1°43′21″W		1088806	Upload Photo	Q26381219
1-9, Oddfellows Row	II	1-9, Oddfellows Row			29 April 1983	SP1933425837; 51°55′51″N 1°43′13″W		1088779	Upload Photo	Q26381193
Mount Pleasant	II	1 and 2, Oddington Road			29 April 1983	SP1953025627; 51°55′44″N 1°43′03″W		1088807	Upload Photo	Q26381221
Enoch's Tower	II	Oddington Road			29 April 1983	SP1963325618; 51°55′43″N 1°42′57″W		1341616	Upload Photo	Q26625698
Former Board School Including Playground Area Railings and Gateway to South	II	Oddington Road			20 July 1998	SP1969325640; 51°55′44″N 1°42′54″W		1375685	Upload Photo	Q26656444
K6 Telephone Kiosk	II	Oddington Road			9 February 2011	SP1951725597; 51°55′43″N 1°43′03″W		1396445	Upload Photo	Q26689108
The Counting House	II	Oddington Road			29 April 1983	SP1960925661; 51°55′45″N 1°42′58″W		1088808	Upload Photo	Q26381222
Coniston	II	6, Park Street			29 April 1983	SP1934025663; 51°55′45″N 1°43′13″W		1088809	Upload Photo	Q26381223
7, Park Street	II	7, Park Street			29 April 1983	SP1935225657; 51°55′45″N 1°43′12″W		1341617	Upload Photo	Q26625699
12, Park Street	II	12, Park Street			29 April 1983	SP1938825644; 51°55′44″N 1°43′10″W		1170536	Upload Photo	Q26464116
Garwick	II	13, Park Street			29 April 1983	SP1939425643; 51°55′44″N 1°43′10″W		1341618	Upload Photo	Q26625700
Gemini	II	14, Park Street			29 April 1983	SP1940525641; 51°55′44″N 1°43′09″W		1088811	Upload Photo	Q26381225
Bell House Staddlestones	II	Park Street			29 April 1983	SP1930625640; 51°55′44″N 1°43′14″W		1341619	Upload Photo	Q26625701
K6 Telephone Kiosk, Park Street	II	Park Street			25 April 1989	SP1933325658; 51°55′45″N 1°43′13″W		1277740	Upload Photo	Q26567135
Park Farmhouse	II	Park Street			25 August 1960	SP1934625660; 51°55′45″N 1°43′12″W		1170508	Upload Photo	Q26464064
Park House and Extension	II	Park Street			29 April 1983	SP1935925655; 51°55′45″N 1°43′12″W		1088810	Upload Photo	Q26381224
Tollgate	II	Park Street			29 April 1983	SP1951125619; 51°55′43″N 1°43′04″W		1170724	Upload Photo	Q26464365
Beauport	II	Sheep Street			25 August 1960	SP1921425643; 51°55′44″N 1°43′19″W		1088816	Upload Photo	Q26381231
Burgage House	II	Sheep Street			29 April 1983	SP1918525649; 51°55′45″N 1°43′21″W		1088817	Upload Photo	Q26381232
Chantry and Gatepiers	II	Sheep Street			29 April 1983	SP1923325648; 51°55′44″N 1°43′18″W		1305896	Upload Photo	Q26592722
Close Cottage Hardcastle Williams (opticians)	II	Sheep Street			29 April 1983	SP1912425648; 51°55′44″N 1°43′24″W		1341581	Upload Photo	Q26625664
Coppers	II	Sheep Street			29 April 1983	SP1903725653; 51°55′45″N 1°43′28″W		1341638	Upload Photo	Q26625718
Cotswold Cottage	II	Sheep Street			29 April 1983	SP1906125678; 51°55′45″N 1°43′27″W		1305926	Upload Photo	Q26592750
Extension of Unicorn Hotel	II	Sheep Street			29 April 1983	SP1903125690; 51°55′46″N 1°43′29″W		1088812	Upload Photo	Q26381227
Gates and Gatepiers to Rear of Woolcomber House	II	Sheep Street			29 April 1983	SP1908425637; 51°55′44″N 1°43′26″W		1170916	Upload Photo	Q26464604
Jasmine Cottage the Manse	II	Sheep Street			29 April 1983	SP1917125649; 51°55′45″N 1°43′21″W		1305910	Upload Photo	Q26592735
Old Rectory	II	Sheep Street			29 April 1983	SP1914325648; 51°55′44″N 1°43′23″W		1170831	Upload Photo	Q26464514
Reid Cottage	II	Sheep Street			29 April 1983	SP1913525649; 51°55′45″N 1°43′23″W		1088819	Upload Photo	Q26381234
Rogers Cottage	II	Sheep Street			29 April 1983	SP1914725670; 51°55′45″N 1°43′23″W		1088815	Upload Photo	Q26381230
South Close Cottage and Walls Linking with Southayes Cottage	II	Sheep Street			29 April 1983	SP1910325631; 51°55′44″N 1°43′25″W		1088820	Upload Photo	Q26381235
Southayes Cottage	II	Sheep Street			29 April 1983	SP1911125648; 51°55′44″N 1°43′25″W		1170869	Upload Photo	Q26464552
Star Inn House	II	Sheep Street			29 April 1983	SP1904925655; 51°55′45″N 1°43′28″W		1341583	Upload Photo	Q26625666
Stow Baptist Chapel	II	Sheep Street			29 April 1983	SP1916925605; 51°55′43″N 1°43′21″W		1088818	Upload Photo	Q26381233
Stow-on-the-wold Post Office	II	Sheep Street			29 April 1983	SP1907225675; 51°55′45″N 1°43′27″W		1088814	Upload Photo	Q26381229
The Crook	II	Sheep Street			29 April 1983	SP1905425680; 51°55′46″N 1°43′27″W		1088813	Upload Photo	Q26381228
The Little House	II	Sheep Street			29 April 1983	SP1905825655; 51°55′45″N 1°43′27″W		1088822	Upload Photo	Q26381237
The Rectory	II	Sheep Street			25 August 1960	SP1907325652; 51°55′45″N 1°43′26″W		1341582	Upload Photo	Q26625665
The Unicorn Hotel	II	Sheep Street	hotel		29 April 1983	SP1901825705; 51°55′46″N 1°43′29″W		1305917	The Unicorn Hotel More images	Q26592742
Tudor House	II	Sheep Street			25 August 1960	SP1906525654; 51°55′45″N 1°43′27″W		1305820	Upload Photo	Q26592650
Walton House	II	Sheep Street			29 April 1983	SP1915425650; 51°55′45″N 1°43′22″W		1341620	Upload Photo	Q26625702
Woolcomber Cottage Woolcomber House	II	Sheep Street			25 August 1960	SP1908625651; 51°55′45″N 1°43′26″W		1088821	Upload Photo	Q26381236
Annwillow Cafe	II	The Square			25 August 1960	SP1909225835; 51°55′51″N 1°43′25″W		1171084	Annwillow Cafe More images	Q26464858
Assunta's	II	The Square			29 April 1983	SP1912625767; 51°55′48″N 1°43′24″W		1341601	Assunta's More images	Q26625683
Cotswold Book Shop	II	The Square			25 August 1960	SP1912825775; 51°55′49″N 1°43′24″W		1088783	Cotswold Book Shop More images	Q26381197
Cotswold Fruit Shop	II	The Square			29 April 1983	SP1912925744; 51°55′48″N 1°43′24″W		1341640	Upload Photo	Q26625720
Cottage to North of George Cottage (Ladies Lavatory)	II	The Square			25 August 1960	SP1909525886; 51°55′52″N 1°43′25″W		1341606	Cottage to North of George Cottage (Ladies Lavatory) More images	Q26625688
Deborah's Kitchen	II	The Square			29 April 1983	SP1917025770; 51°55′48″N 1°43′21″W		1088799	Deborah's Kitchen More images	Q26381212
Elmsneath	II	The Square			25 August 1960	SP1915525865; 51°55′51″N 1°43′22″W		1341607	Elmsneath More images	Q26625689
Green Elms Stow Antiques	II	The Square			25 August 1960	SP1914925873; 51°55′52″N 1°43′22″W		1088790	Green Elms Stow Antiques More images	Q26381204
Grey House	II	The Square			25 August 1960	SP1918225804; 51°55′50″N 1°43′21″W		1088793	Grey House More images	Q26381207
Lloyd's Bank	II	The Square			29 April 1983	SP1915025723; 51°55′47″N 1°43′22″W		1171341	Lloyd's Bank More images	Q26465261
Manor House	II	The Square			25 August 1960	SP1911825886; 51°55′52″N 1°43′24″W		1088789	Manor House More images	Q26381203
Meb Electricity Centre	II	The Square			29 April 1983	SP1916025778; 51°55′49″N 1°43′22″W		1341610	Meb Electricity Centre More images	Q26625692
Part of Premises Wye Antiques	II	The Square			25 August 1960	SP1909525874; 51°55′52″N 1°43′25″W		1088788	Part of Premises Wye Antiques More images	Q26381202
Part of Premises of Wye Antiques	II	The Square			25 August 1960	SP1908825863; 51°55′51″N 1°43′26″W		1341605	Upload Photo	Q26625687
Pine House (premises of Francis Hill and Cole)	II	The Square			29 April 1983	SP1919325770; 51°55′48″N 1°43′20″W		1305685	Pine House (premises of Francis Hill and Cole) More images	Q26592530
Premises of Cheltenham and Gloucester Building Society	II	The Square			25 August 1960	SP1912325789; 51°55′49″N 1°43′24″W		1088784	Premises of Cheltenham and Gloucester Building Society More images	Q26381198
Premises of Duncan Baggott	II	The Square			25 August 1960	SP1909325849; 51°55′51″N 1°43′25″W		1088787	Premises of Duncan Baggott More images	Q26381201
Premises of Duncan Baggott	II	The Square			25 August 1960	SP1909325842; 51°55′51″N 1°43′25″W		1341604	Upload Photo	Q26625686
Premises of H W Penford	II	The Square			25 August 1960	SP1911825804; 51°55′50″N 1°43′24″W		1088785	Premises of H W Penford More images	Q26381199
Premises of Remick	II	The Square			29 April 1983	SP1914325724; 51°55′47″N 1°43′23″W		1341609	Upload Photo	Q26625691
Priory Cottage	II	The Square			29 April 1983	SP1918325796; 51°55′49″N 1°43′21″W		1171215	Priory Cottage More images	Q26465057
Priory Studio	II	The Square			29 April 1983	SP1917925812; 51°55′50″N 1°43′21″W		1088792	Priory Studio More images	Q26381206
Queen's Head Inn Public House	II	The Square	pub		25 August 1960	SP1909125856; 51°55′51″N 1°43′26″W		1171113	Queen's Head Inn Public House More images	Q26464914
Ross House	II	The Square			25 August 1960	SP1918525787; 51°55′49″N 1°43′21″W		1088794	Ross House More images	Q26381208
St Edward's (Stow) Well	II	The Square			29 April 1983	SP1944226144; 51°56′00″N 1°43′07″W		1088756	Upload Photo	Q26381171
St Edward's Cottage	II	The Square			29 April 1983	SP1915725786; 51°55′49″N 1°43′22″W		1088800	Upload Photo	Q26381213
St Edward's Hall	II	The Square			29 April 1983	SP1915225803; 51°55′49″N 1°43′22″W		1171368	St Edward's Hall More images	Q26465306
St Edward's House	II*	The Square			25 August 1960	SP1912525760; 51°55′48″N 1°43′24″W		1088782	Upload Photo	Q26381196
Stow Lodge Hotel	II	The Square			25 August 1960	SP1906625792; 51°55′49″N 1°43′27″W		1088786	Upload Photo	Q26381200
Stow Youth Hostel (YHA)	II	The Square			25 August 1960	SP1916825832; 51°55′50″N 1°43′21″W		1088791	Stow Youth Hostel (YHA) More images	Q26381205
Talbot House	II	The Square			25 August 1960	SP1912725751; 51°55′48″N 1°43′24″W		1088781	Talbot House More images	Q26381195
Tayler and Fletcher	II	The Square, Stow On The Wold, GL54 1BL			25 August 1960	SP1918625725; 51°55′47″N 1°43′21″W		1341608	Tayler and Fletcher More images	Q26625690
The Cottage	II	The Square			29 April 1983	SP1916325772; 51°55′48″N 1°43′22″W		1171360	The Cottage More images	Q26465292
The Cross	II	The Square	market cross		25 August 1960	SP1917125748; 51°55′48″N 1°43′21″W		1088780	The Cross More images	Q17669235
The Curiosity Shop	II	The Square			29 April 1983	SP1912025796; 51°55′49″N 1°43′24″W		1341603	The Curiosity Shop More images	Q26625685
The Elms the Little Elms	II	The Square			25 August 1960	SP1913025882; 51°55′52″N 1°43′23″W		1171165	The Elms the Little Elms More images	Q26464995
The Old Red Lion Hotel	II	The Square			25 August 1960	SP1915825853; 51°55′51″N 1°43′22″W		1171178	The Old Red Lion Hotel More images	Q26465016
The Pharmacy	II	The Square			25 August 1960	SP1917625726; 51°55′47″N 1°43′21″W		1171289	The Pharmacy More images	Q26465181
The Stocks	II	The Square			25 August 1960	SP1913325857; 51°55′51″N 1°43′23″W		1341639	Upload Photo	Q26625719
The Talbot Hotel (and Rear Extensions)	II	The Square	pub		3 March 1982	SP1915925730; 51°55′47″N 1°43′22″W		1088797	The Talbot Hotel (and Rear Extensions) More images	Q26381210
Walls of Ture Between the Talbot Hotel and the Pharmacy	II	The Square			29 April 1983	SP1918725682; 51°55′46″N 1°43′21″W		1088798	Upload Photo	Q26381211
White Hart Hotel	II	The Square	hotel		25 August 1960	SP1917625820; 51°55′50″N 1°43′21″W		1305704	White Hart Hotel More images	Q26592547
Workshop to Rear of Grey House (premises of Smalley and Co)	II	The Square			29 April 1983	SP1921725794; 51°55′49″N 1°43′19″W		1088795	Upload Photo	Q26381209
The King's Arms Hotel, with Camilla	II*	The Square	hotel		25 August 1960	SP1919625757; 51°55′48″N 1°43′20″W		1088796	The King's Arms Hotel, with Camilla More images	Q17536084
3, Wragg's Row	II	3, Wragg's Row			25 August 1960	SP1901225619; 51°55′44″N 1°43′30″W		1341612	Upload Photo	Q26625694
4, Wragg's Row	II	4, Wragg's Row			29 April 1983	SP1901225612; 51°55′43″N 1°43′30″W		1088803	Upload Photo	Q26381216
5, Wragg's Row	II	5, Wragg's Row			29 April 1983	SP1901125605; 51°55′43″N 1°43′30″W		1341613	Upload Photo	Q26625695
Clematis Cottage and 7, Wragg's Row	II	7, Wragg's Row			29 April 1983	SP1901125595; 51°55′43″N 1°43′30″W		1088804	Upload Photo	Q26381217
8 and 9, Wragg's Row	II	8 and 9, Wragg's Row			29 April 1983	SP1901025580; 51°55′42″N 1°43′30″W		1088805	Upload Photo	Q26381218

== See also ==
- Grade I listed buildings in Gloucestershire
- Grade II* listed buildings in Gloucestershire

== Sources ==
- Verey, David; Brooks, Alan (1999), Gloucestershire 1: The Cotswolds, The Buildings of England, New Haven and London: Yale University Press, ISBN 978-0-300-09604-0
