= Listed buildings in Cirencester =

Buildings in Worcester, England

Cirencester is a town and civil parish in Gloucestershire, England. It contains 372 listed buildings that are recorded in the National Heritage List for England. Of these three are grade I, 35 are grade II* and 334 are grade II.

This list is based on the information retrieved online from Historic England.

== Key ==
Grade	Criteria
I	Buildings that are of exceptional interest
II*	Particularly important buildings of more than special interest
II	Buildings that are of special interest

== Listing ==
Name	Grade	Location	Type	Completed (Note: The date given is the date used by Historic England as significant for the initial building or that of an important part in the structure's description.)	Date designated	Grid ref. (Note: The grid reference is based on the British national grid reference system, sometimes known as OSGB36, used by the Ordnance Survey.) Geo-coordinates	Notes	Entry number (Note: The "List Entry Number" is a unique number assigned to each listed building and scheduled monument by Historic England.)	Image	Wikidata
Milestone at NGR SO 994 017	II	A419			24 May 1993	SO9937001765; 51°42′53″N 2°00′38″W		1187415	Milestone at NGR SO 994 017 More images	Q26482619
Milestone at NGR SP 010 010	II	A429			24 May 1993	SP0103801096; 51°42′31″N 1°59′11″W		1187416	Milestone at NGR SP 010 010 More images	Q26482621
Milestone at NGR SP 036 027	II	A429			24 May 1993	SP0365202710; 51°43′23″N 1°56′55″W		1187417	Milestone at NGR SP 036 027 More images	Q26482622
Royal Agricultural College	II	A429			23 July 1971	SP0044201195; 51°42′34″N 1°59′42″W		1187418	Upload Photo	Q26482623
Royal Agricultural College Chapel	II	A429			23 July 1971	SP0046801252; 51°42′36″N 1°59′41″W		1298726	Upload Photo	Q26586183
Stow Lodge	II	A429			24 May 1993	SP0394102964; 51°43′31″N 1°56′40″W		1187419	Upload Photo	Q26482624
2, Barton Lane	II	2, Barton Lane			14 August 1992	SP0201802482; 51°43′16″N 1°58′20″W		1187420	2, Barton Lane More images	Q26482625
Golden Farm Public House	II	Beeches Road			23 July 1971	SP0317001731; 51°42′51″N 1°57′20″W		1298727	Golden Farm Public House More images	Q26586184
Phoenix Centre and Attached Garden Wall	II	Beeches Road			5 August 1992	SP0288901978; 51°42′59″N 1°57′34″W		1187421	Upload Photo	Q26482626
The Old Mill House	II	Beeches Road			4 July 1975	SP0320701493; 51°42′44″N 1°57′18″W		1280970	Upload Photo	Q26570056
Wendovers	II	4, Black Jack Street			23 July 1971	SP0222802082; 51°43′03″N 1°58′09″W		1298728	Wendovers More images	Q26684091
Wendovers	II	6, Black Jack Street			23 July 1971	SP0221902080; 51°43′03″N 1°58′09″W		1204947	Wendovers More images	Q26500339
7, Black Jack Street	II	7, Black Jack Street			14 June 1948	SP0218702060; 51°43′02″N 1°58′11″W		1204949	7, Black Jack Street More images	Q26500340
C Gillman and Sons and Attached Outbuildings	II	8, Black Jack Street			23 July 1971	SP0221002087; 51°43′03″N 1°58′10″W		1187422	C Gillman and Sons and Attached Outbuildings More images	Q26482627
12, Black Jack Street	II	12, Black Jack Street			23 July 1971	SP0219302076; 51°43′03″N 1°58′11″W		1280974	12, Black Jack Street More images	Q26570059
Jesse Smith and Company	II	14, 16 and 18, Black Jack Street			9 July 1991	SP0218102072; 51°43′03″N 1°58′11″W		1298729	Jesse Smith and Company More images	Q26586186
24, Black Jack Street	II	24, Black Jack Street			23 July 1971	SP0216102064; 51°43′02″N 1°58′12″W		1204962	24, Black Jack Street More images	Q26500353
Gloucestershire Echo and Attached Gate Pier	II	44, Black Jack Street			28 April 1993	SP0215302064; 51°43′02″N 1°58′13″W		1187423	Gloucestershire Echo and Attached Gate Pier More images	Q26482628
Lower Bowling Green Farm	II	7, Bowlimg Green Lane			24 May 1993	SP0222303287; 51°43′42″N 1°58′09″W		1280943	Upload Photo	Q26570031
Bridge End House	II	25, Bridge Road			24 May 1993	SP0277000973; 51°42′27″N 1°57′41″W		1204970	Upload Photo	Q26500360
Hobbs and Chambers	II	1, Castle Street			24 May 1993	SP0227402014; 51°43′01″N 1°58′07″W		1187424	Hobbs and Chambers More images	Q26482629
2-12, Castle Street	II	2-12, Castle Street			23 July 1971	SP0224002022; 51°43′01″N 1°58′08″W		1204979	2-12, Castle Street More images	Q26500368
3 and 5, Castle Street	II	3 and 5, Castle Street			24 May 1993	SP0226202008; 51°43′00″N 1°58′07″W		1298730	3 and 5, Castle Street More images	Q26586187
7, Castle Street	II	7, Castle Street			24 May 1993	SP0225302004; 51°43′00″N 1°58′08″W		1204985	7, Castle Street More images	Q26500374
Lloyd's Bank	II*	14 and 16, Castle Street			14 June 1948	SP0218601998; 51°43′00″N 1°58′11″W		1187425	Lloyd's Bank More images	Q17536627
15, Castle Street	II	15, Castle Street			14 June 1948	SP0223801997; 51°43′00″N 1°58′08″W		1204988	15, Castle Street More images	Q26500377
The Black Horse Public House	II	17, Castle Street			14 June 1948	SP0222601992; 51°43′00″N 1°58′09″W		1298731	The Black Horse Public House More images	Q26586188
18, Castle Street	II	18, Castle Street			23 July 1971	SP0216801983; 51°43′00″N 1°58′12″W		1204991	18, Castle Street More images	Q26500380
19 and 21, Castle Street	II	19 and 21, Castle Street			14 June 1948	SP0221101988; 51°43′00″N 1°58′10″W		1187426	19 and 21, Castle Street More images	Q26482630
20, Castle Street	II	20, Castle Street			23 July 1971	SP0216101978; 51°42′59″N 1°58′12″W		1205068	20, Castle Street More images	Q26500449
22, 24 and 26, Castle Street	II	22, 24 and 26, Castle Street			23 July 1971	SP0215301969; 51°42′59″N 1°58′13″W		1280910	22, 24 and 26, Castle Street More images	Q26570000
23, Castle Street	II	23, Castle Street			14 June 1948	SP0220001982; 51°43′00″N 1°58′10″W		1187427	23, Castle Street More images	Q26482631
30, Castle Street	II	30, Castle Street			24 May 1993	SP0213901955; 51°42′59″N 1°58′14″W		1205071	30, Castle Street More images	Q26500452
31 and 33, Castle Street	II	31 and 33, Castle Street			24 May 1993	SP0216801954; 51°42′59″N 1°58′12″W		1298732	31 and 33, Castle Street More images	Q26586189
53 and 61, Castle Street	II	53 and 61, Castle Street			24 May 1993	SP0210101922; 51°42′58″N 1°58′16″W		1187428	53 and 61, Castle Street More images	Q26482632
63, Castle Street	II	63, Castle Street			23 July 1971	SP0209301919; 51°42′58″N 1°58′16″W		1280855	63, Castle Street More images	Q26569945
Cecily Hill Gates and Screen	II	Cecily Hill			23 July 1971	SP0181702132; 51°43′04″N 1°58′30″W		1187436	Upload Photo	Q26482638
Stable Block Approximately 3 Metres West of Number 9	II	Cecily Hill			23 July 1971	SP0190602108; 51°43′04″N 1°58′26″W		1298694	Upload Photo	Q26586154
1, Cecily Hill	II	1, Cecily Hill			23 July 1971	SP0199902129; 51°43′04″N 1°58′21″W		1298733	1, Cecily Hill More images	Q26586190
2 and 2a, Cecily Hill	II	2 and 2a, Cecily Hill			23 July 1971	SP0198202160; 51°43′05″N 1°58′22″W		1205201	2 and 2a, Cecily Hill More images	Q26500566
3, Cecily Hill	II	3, Cecily Hill			14 June 1948	SP0198502127; 51°43′04″N 1°58′22″W		1205202	3, Cecily Hill More images	Q26500567
Garden Wall Attached To Number 5	II*	5, Cecily Hill			14 June 1948	SP0194702123; 51°43′04″N 1°58′24″W		1205204	Garden Wall Attached To Number 5	Q17536682
7, Cecily Hill	II*	7, Cecily Hill			14 June 1948	SP0193402120; 51°43′04″N 1°58′24″W		1187430	Upload Photo	Q17536634
9, Cecily Hill	II	9, Cecily Hill			23 July 1971	SP0191302116; 51°43′04″N 1°58′25″W		1205206	9, Cecily Hill More images	Q26500570
15, Cecily Hill	II	15, Cecily Hill			23 July 1971	SP0189602113; 51°43′04″N 1°58′26″W		1280816	15, Cecily Hill More images	Q26569908
17, Cecily Hill	II	17, Cecily Hill			23 July 1971	SP0188802110; 51°43′04″N 1°58′27″W		1187431	17, Cecily Hill More images	Q26482634
Number 19 and Attached Railings	II	19, Cecily Hill			14 June 1948	SP0187702109; 51°43′04″N 1°58′27″W		1205275	Number 19 and Attached Railings More images	Q26500634
21, 23 and 25, Cecily Hill	II	21, 23 and 25, Cecily Hill			14 June 1948	SP0186502107; 51°43′04″N 1°58′28″W		1298695	Upload Photo	Q26586155
Tontine Buildings	II	22-30, Cecily Hill			14 June 1948	SP0197402148; 51°43′05″N 1°58′22″W		1187429	Tontine Buildings More images	Q26482633
Number 27 and Attached Wall and Outbuilding	II	27, Cecily Hill			14 June 1948	SP0185002105; 51°43′04″N 1°58′29″W		1205276	Number 27 and Attached Wall and Outbuilding More images	Q26500635
Number 29 and Attached Wall and Outbuilding	II	29, Cecily Hill			23 July 1971	SP0183402110; 51°43′04″N 1°58′29″W		1187432	Upload Photo	Q26482635
31, Cecily Hill	II	31, Cecily Hill			23 July 1971	SP0180802117; 51°43′04″N 1°58′31″W		1205278	31, Cecily Hill More images	Q26500637
Cecily Hill House and Attached Wall and Gates	II	32, Cecily Hill			14 June 1948	SP0192502154; 51°43′05″N 1°58′25″W		1205284	Upload Photo	Q26500642
34 and 36, Cecily Hill	II	34 and 36, Cecily Hill			14 June 1948	SP0190502149; 51°43′05″N 1°58′26″W		1298696	34 and 36, Cecily Hill More images	Q26586156
38, Cecily Hill	II	38, Cecily Hill			23 July 1971	SP0189702148; 51°43′05″N 1°58′26″W		1205292	38, Cecily Hill More images	Q26500648
40 and 42, Cecily Hill	II	40 and 42, Cecily Hill			14 June 1948	SP0188602149; 51°43′05″N 1°58′27″W		1187433	Upload Photo	Q26482636
The Old Barracks	II*	44, Cecily Hill			23 July 1971	SP0184302151; 51°43′05″N 1°58′29″W		1187434	The Old Barracks More images	Q16980320
46, Cecily Hill	II	46, Cecily Hill			23 July 1971	SP0181202149; 51°43′05″N 1°58′31″W		1187435	46, Cecily Hill More images	Q26482637
K6 Telephone Kiosk by Garden Wall of Syrena House	II	Cheltenham Road			10 April 1992	SP0169103107; 51°43′36″N 1°58′37″W		1187438	Upload Photo	Q26482640
Stratton Firs	II	Cheltenham Road, Stratton			24 May 1993	SP0171903080; 51°43′35″N 1°58′35″W		1187440	Stratton Firs More images	Q26482642
Syrena House	II	1, Cheltenham Road, Stratton			24 May 1993	SP0168203130; 51°43′37″N 1°58′37″W		1187437	Syrena House More images	Q26482639
91, Cheltenham Road	II	91, Cheltenham Road, Stratton			23 July 1971	SP0189803556; 51°43′51″N 1°58′26″W		1187439	91, Cheltenham Road More images	Q26482641
50, 52 and 54, Chester Street	II	50, 52 and 54, Chester Street			24 May 1993	SP0276201521; 51°42′45″N 1°57′41″W		1298697	50, 52 and 54, Chester Street More images	Q26586157
56 and 58, Chester Street	II	56 and 58, Chester Street			24 May 1993	SP0277401511; 51°42′44″N 1°57′41″W		1280776	Upload Photo	Q26569868
Barn and Attached Cattle Stalls Approximately 20 Metres North of Chesterton Farmhouse	II	Chesterton			24 May 1993	SP0128700360; 51°42′07″N 1°58′58″W		1187401	Upload Photo	Q26482610
Chesterton Farmhouse and Attached Outbuilding and Garden Wall	II	Chesterton			25 May 1993	SP0128300308; 51°42′05″N 1°58′58″W		1298718	Upload Photo	Q26586177
Cemetery Wall, Railings And Gates	II	Chesterton Lane			30 January 1992	SP0147201246; 51°42′36″N 1°58′48″W		1205364	Cemetery Wall, Railings And Gates More images	Q26500713
Chesterton House	II	Chesterton Lane			23 July 1971	SP0207501062; 51°42′30″N 1°58′17″W		1187442	Upload Photo	Q26482644
Nonconformist Cemetery Chapel	II	Chesterton Lane			24 May 1993	SP0142201213; 51°42′35″N 1°58′51″W		1205358	Nonconformist Cemetery Chapel More images	Q26500708
Cemetery Lodge	II	Chesterton Lodge			30 January 1992	SP0147801232; 51°42′35″N 1°58′48″W		1298698	Cemetery Lodge More images	Q26586158
Alfred's Hall at NGR SO 972 031	II*	Cirencester Park			14 June 1948	SO9726203126; 51°43′37″N 2°02′28″W		1298719	Alfred's Hall at NGR SO 972 031 More images	Q17536835
Hexagon	II*	Cirencester Park			14 June 1948	SP0130702235; 51°43′08″N 1°58′57″W		1187402	Hexagon More images	Q17536590
Horse Temple	II	Cirencester Park			24 January 1985	SP0196701881; 51°42′56″N 1°58′23″W		1187403	Upload Photo	Q26482611
Ice House Approximately 150 Metres South West of Cirencester Park Mansion	II*	Cirencester Park			24 May 1993	SP0189901846; 51°42′55″N 1°58′26″W		1298720	Upload Photo	Q17536842
Ivy Lodge at NGR SO 990O26 and Attached Farmbuildings and Wall	II*	Cirencester Park			23 July 1971	SO9907402605; 51°43′20″N 2°00′53″W		1187404	Ivy Lodge at NGR SO 990O26 and Attached Farmbuildings and Wall More images	Q17536596
Pope's Seat	II*	Cirencester Park			14 June 1948	SO9992802375; 51°43′12″N 2°00′09″W		1204826	Pope's Seat More images	Q17536677
Queen Anne's Monument	II*	Cirencester Park			23 July 1971	SP0061801769; 51°42′53″N 1°59′33″W		1187406	Queen Anne's Monument More images	Q17536606
Round Tower at NGR SO 9971 0253 and Attached Wall	II	Cirencester Park			23 July 1971	SO9970802529; 51°43′17″N 2°00′20″W		1204830	Round Tower at NGR SO 9971 0253 and Attached Wall More images	Q26500236
Shelter Shed Approximately 50 Metres North West of Ivy Lodge	II	Cirencester Park			24 May 1993	SO9904202629; 51°43′21″N 2°00′55″W		1298721	Shelter Shed Approximately 50 Metres North West of Ivy Lodge More images	Q26586178
Square Tower at SO 9933 0279	II	Cirencester Park			23 July 1971	SO9932502786; 51°43′26″N 2°00′40″W		1298722	Square Tower at SO 9933 0279 More images	Q26586179
Stone Pier at NGR SP 0019 0229	II	Cirencester Park			24 May 1993	SP0019102275; 51°43′09″N 1°59′55″W		1298723	Stone Pier at NGR SP 0019 0229 More images	Q26586180
Stone Pier at NGR SP 0020 0234	II	Cirencester Park			24 May 1993	SP0019802328; 51°43′11″N 1°59′55″W		1204835	Stone Pier at NGR SP 0020 0234 More images	Q26500240
Stone Pier at NGR SP 0060 0223	II	Cirencester Park			24 May 1993	SP0060102230; 51°43′08″N 1°59′34″W		1187407	Stone Pier at NGR SP 0060 0223 More images	Q26482613
Stone Pier At NGR SP 0061 0229	II	Cirencester Park			24 May 1993	SP0060802285; 51°43′09″N 1°59′33″W		1204841	Stone Pier At NGR SP 0061 0229 More images	Q26500245
The Horse Guards, Pavilion At So 9776 0255	II	Cirencester Park			14 June 1948	SO9775902539; 51°43′18″N 2°02′02″W		1204846	The Horse Guards, Pavilion At So 9776 0255 More images	Q26500250
The Horse Guards, Pavilion At So 9777 0259	II	Cirencester Park			14 June 1948	SO9776502581; 51°43′19″N 2°02′02″W		1204850	The Horse Guards, Pavilion At So 9777 0259 More images	Q26500254
Kennels Cottage Whips Cottage And Attached Ranges Of Kennels	II	Cirencester Park			24 May 1993	SP0147901574; 51°42′46″N 1°58′48″W		1187405	Kennels Cottage Whips Cottage And Attached Ranges Of Kennels More images	Q26482612
10, City Bank Road	II	10, City Bank Road			29 April 1991	SP0304101219; 51°42′35″N 1°57′27″W		1280751	10, City Bank Road More images	Q26569845
12, City Bank Road	II	12, City Bank Road			23 July 1971	SP0303401251; 51°42′36″N 1°57′27″W		1298699	12, City Bank Road More images	Q26586159
Rose Cottage	II	14, City Bank Road			23 July 1971	SP0302801248; 51°42′36″N 1°57′27″W		1205389	Rose Cottage More images	Q26500735
Obelisk at Sp 0213 0132	II*	Cotswold Avenue			23 July 1971	SP0212801316; 51°42′38″N 1°58′14″W		1187413	Obelisk at Sp 0213 0132 More images	Q17536618
Baptist Chapel	II	Coxwell Street			23 July 1971	SP0215602147; 51°43′05″N 1°58′13″W		1205637	Baptist Chapel More images	Q26500953
Baptist Chapel Gates and Railings	II	Coxwell Street			24 May 1993	SP0215202161; 51°43′05″N 1°58′13″W		1298703	Upload Photo	Q26586163
Old Court	II*	Coxwell Street			14 June 1948	SP0207602161; 51°43′05″N 1°58′17″W		1205625	Old Court	Q17536687
Wall between Old Court and Number 53	II	Coxwell Street			23 July 1971	SP0205502169; 51°43′06″N 1°58′18″W		1205632	Upload Photo	Q26500948
1, 2, 3 Coxwell Court	II	1, 2, 3, Coxwell Street			14 June 1948	SP0211202159; 51°43′05″N 1°58′15″W		1205651	1, 2, 3 Coxwell Court More images	Q26500965
1, Coxwell Street	II	1, Coxwell Street			14 June 1948	SP0221602188; 51°43′06″N 1°58′10″W		1205399	1, Coxwell Street More images	Q26500743
5, Dollar Street	II	2, Coxwell Street			23 July 1971	SP0221102198; 51°43′07″N 1°58′10″W		1280563	5, Dollar Street More images	Q26569684
3, Coxwell Street	II	3, Coxwell Street			14 June 1948	SP0221002183; 51°43′06″N 1°58′10″W		1187443	3, Coxwell Street More images	Q26482645
5, Coxwell Street	II	5, Coxwell Street			14 June 1948	SP0220302179; 51°43′06″N 1°58′10″W		1205406	5, Coxwell Street More images	Q26500749
The Little House	II	6, Coxwell Street			23 July 1971	SP0216902176; 51°43′06″N 1°58′12″W		1187444	The Little House More images	Q26482646
7 and 11, Coxwell Street	II	7 and 11, Coxwell Street			14 June 1948	SP0219302175; 51°43′06″N 1°58′11″W		1280726	7 and 11, Coxwell Street More images	Q26569827
Abbot's	II	10, Coxwell Street			14 June 1948	SP0215302172; 51°43′06″N 1°58′13″W		1298700	Upload Photo	Q26586160
12, Coxwell Street	II	12, Coxwell Street			23 July 1971	SP0208502177; 51°43′06″N 1°58′16″W		1280730	Upload Photo	Q26569829
14 and 20, Coxwell Street	II	14 and 20, Coxwell Street			14 June 1948	SP0206602175; 51°43′06″N 1°58′17″W		1187445	14 and 20, Coxwell Street More images	Q26482647
22 and 30, Coxwell Street	II	22 and 30, Coxwell Street			14 June 1948	SP0205102181; 51°43′06″N 1°58′18″W		1205539	22 and 30, Coxwell Street More images	Q26500874
25, Coxwell Street	II	25, Coxwell Street			14 June 1948	SP0218402168; 51°43′06″N 1°58′11″W		1298701	25, Coxwell Street More images	Q26586161
27 and 31, Coxwell Street	II	27 and 31, Coxwell Street			14 June 1948	SP0217202164; 51°43′06″N 1°58′12″W		1205606	27 and 31, Coxwell Street More images	Q26500929
32 and 36, Coxwell Street	II	32 and 36, Coxwell Street			23 July 1971	SP0204202186; 51°43′06″N 1°58′19″W		1187446	32 and 36, Coxwell Street More images	Q26482648
33 and 37, Coxwell Street	II	33 and 37, Coxwell Street			23 July 1971	SP0216302161; 51°43′05″N 1°58′12″W		1280626	33 and 37, Coxwell Street More images	Q26569738
38 And 40, Coxwell Street	II	38 and 40, Coxwell Street			23 July 1971	SP0202602191; 51°43′06″N 1°58′19″W		1187447	38 And 40, Coxwell Street More images	Q26482649
Numbers 39, 41 And 43 And Attached Wall And Gate Piers	II	41 and 43 And Attached Wall And Gate Piers, Coxwell Street			23 July 1971	SP0214002151; 51°43′05″N 1°58′14″W		1205620	Numbers 39, 41 And 43 And Attached Wall And Gate Piers More images	Q26500940
49 And 51 Coxwell Street	II	49 and 51, Coxwell Street			14 June 1948	SP0209002160; 51°43′05″N 1°58′16″W		1298702	49 And 51 Coxwell Street More images	Q26684089
Woolgatherers and Attached Warehouse	II*	53, Coxwell Street			14 June 1948	SP0203102168; 51°43′06″N 1°58′19″W		1187448	Woolgatherers and Attached Warehouse More images	Q17536640
The Cranhams	II	Cranhams Lane, The Cranhams			24 May 1993	SP0179400338; 51°42′06″N 1°58′32″W		1187449	Upload Photo	Q26482650
The Wheatsheaf	II	Cricklade Street			30 January 1992	SP0237401832; 51°42′55″N 1°58′01″W		1205701	The Wheatsheaf More images	Q26501009
5, Cricklade Street	II	5, Cricklade Street			27 April 1992	SP0229702005; 51°43′00″N 1°58′05″W		1205668	5, Cricklade Street More images	Q26500979
7, Cricklade Street	II	7, Cricklade Street			23 July 1971	SP0230002000; 51°43′00″N 1°58′05″W		1298704	7, Cricklade Street More images	Q26586164
12 and 12a, Cricklade Street	II	12 and 12a, Cricklade Street			14 June 1948	SP0229701953; 51°42′59″N 1°58′05″W		1205678	12 and 12a, Cricklade Street More images	Q26500987
46 and 48, Cricklade Street	II	46 and 48, Cricklade Street			24 May 1993	SP0235801832; 51°42′55″N 1°58′02″W		1187450	46 and 48, Cricklade Street More images	Q26482651
64, Cricklade Street	II	64, Cricklade Street			23 July 1971	SP0238001780; 51°42′53″N 1°58′01″W		1205686	64, Cricklade Street More images	Q26500995
72 and 74, Cricklade Street	II	72 and 74, Cricklade Street			1 March 1993	SP0238701748; 51°42′52″N 1°58′01″W		1187451	72 and 74, Cricklade Street More images	Q26482652
76-82, Cricklade Street	II	76-82, Cricklade Street			30 January 1992	SP0239201737; 51°42′52″N 1°58′00″W		1205694	76-82, Cricklade Street More images	Q26501003
Number 18 and Attached Wall and Gate Pier	II	Dollar Street			5 June 1969	SP0221202232; 51°43′08″N 1°58′10″W		1187458	Number 18 and Attached Wall and Gate Pier More images	Q26482659
1 and 3, Dollar Street	II	1 and 3, Dollar Street			14 June 1948	SP0222702188; 51°43′06″N 1°58′09″W		1187452	1 and 3, Dollar Street More images	Q26482653
Number 2 and Associated Small Section of Abbey Wall	II	Dollar Street			14 June 1948	SP0224902187; 51°43′06″N 1°58′08″W		1205710	Number 2 and Associated Small Section of Abbey Wall More images	Q26501017
4, Dollar Street	II	4, Dollar Street			14 June 1948	SP0224402194; 51°43′06″N 1°58′08″W		1298706	4, Dollar Street More images	Q26586166
Numbers 6 and 8 and Attached Stable Cottage	II	Dollar Street			14 June 1948	SP0223702200; 51°43′07″N 1°58′08″W		1205727	Numbers 6 and 8 and Attached Stable Cottage More images	Q26501030
7, Dollar Street	II	7, Dollar Street			23 July 1971	SP0220702208; 51°43′07″N 1°58′10″W		1187453	7, Dollar Street More images	Q26482654
9, Dollar Street	II	9, Dollar Street			23 July 1971	SP0219902218; 51°43′07″N 1°58′10″W		1205730	9, Dollar Street More images	Q26501033
10 and 12, Dollar Street	II	10 and 12, Dollar Street			14 June 1948	SP0223202205; 51°43′07″N 1°58′09″W		1187454	10 and 12, Dollar Street More images	Q26482655
11, Dollar Street	II	11, Dollar Street			23 July 1971	SP0218802227; 51°43′08″N 1°58′11″W		1298707	11, Dollar Street More images	Q26586167
Cirencester Natural Therapies	II	14, Dollar Street			14 June 1948	SP0222302217; 51°43′07″N 1°58′09″W		1187455	Cirencester Natural Therapies More images	Q26482656
15, Dollar Street	II	15, Dollar Street			23 July 1971	SP0218302233; 51°43′08″N 1°58′11″W		1187456	15, Dollar Street More images	Q26482657
17, Dollar Street	II	17, Dollar Street			23 July 1971	SP0217902238; 51°43′08″N 1°58′11″W		1187457	17, Dollar Street More images	Q26482658
20, Dollar Street	II	20, Dollar Street			5 June 1969	SP0220502235; 51°43′08″N 1°58′10″W		1187459	20, Dollar Street More images	Q26482660
22 and 24, Dollar Street	II	22 and 24, Dollar Street			5 June 1969	SP0219602245; 51°43′08″N 1°58′11″W		1187460	22 and 24, Dollar Street More images	Q26482661
28, Dollar Street	II	28, Dollar Street			23 July 1971	SP0217802278; 51°43′09″N 1°58′12″W		1187461	28, Dollar Street More images	Q26482662
Dollar Street House And Attached Steps, Railing Bases And Ironwork	II*	30 and 32, Dollar Street			14 June 1948	SP0217202296; 51°43′10″N 1°58′12″W		1280530	Dollar Street House And Attached Steps, Railing Bases And Ironwork More images	Q17536808
34 and 36, Dollar Street	II	34 and 36, Dollar Street			23 July 1971	SP0215602315; 51°43′10″N 1°58′13″W		1187462	34 and 36, Dollar Street More images	Q26482663
38, Dollar Street	II	38, Dollar Street			23 July 1971	SP0215002328; 51°43′11″N 1°58′13″W		1205830	38, Dollar Street More images	Q26501114
43 and 45, Dollar Street	II	43 and 45, Dollar Street			14 June 1948	SP0215802267; 51°43′09″N 1°58′13″W		1187463	43 and 45, Dollar Street More images	Q26482664
Bingham Library	II	1, Dyer Street			23 July 1971	SP0244902025; 51°43′01″N 1°57′57″W		1205843	Bingham Library More images	Q26501126
2 and 4, Dyer Street	II	2 and 4, Dyer Street			14 June 1948	SP0242802008; 51°43′00″N 1°57′59″W		1298708	2 and 4, Dyer Street More images	Q26586168
3 and 5, Dyer Street	II	3 and 5, Dyer Street			14 June 1948	SP0247102018; 51°43′01″N 1°57′56″W		1280514	3 and 5, Dyer Street More images	Q26569641
Cotswold Sheepskin Hadleigh Hayes House John Hawes And Company	II	6, Dyer Street			23 July 1971	SP0243702004; 51°43′00″N 1°57′58″W		1187464	Cotswold Sheepskin Hadleigh Hayes House John Hawes And Company More images	Q26482665
7, Dyer Street	II	7, Dyer Street			14 June 1948	SP0249002003; 51°43′00″N 1°57′55″W		1205876	7, Dyer Street More images	Q26501156
9 and 11, Dyer Street	II	9 and 11, Dyer Street			14 June 1948	SP0250101998; 51°43′00″N 1°57′55″W		1298709	9 and 11, Dyer Street More images	Q26586169
10, Dyer Street	II	10, Dyer Street			23 July 1971	SP0244602003; 51°43′00″N 1°57′58″W		1205880	10, Dyer Street More images	Q26501160
12, Dyer Street	II	12, Dyer Street			14 June 1948	SP0245602000; 51°43′00″N 1°57′57″W		1187465	12, Dyer Street More images	Q26482666
Dyer Lodge	II	15 and 17, Dyer Street			23 July 1971	SP0251101992; 51°43′00″N 1°57′54″W		1205894	Dyer Lodge More images	Q26501174
33, Dyer Street	II	33, Dyer Street			14 June 1948	SP0259501959; 51°42′59″N 1°57′50″W		1205903	33, Dyer Street More images	Q26501183
39 and 41, Dyer Street	II	39 and 41, Dyer Street			14 June 1948	SP0261601948; 51°42′59″N 1°57′49″W		1187466	39 and 41, Dyer Street More images	Q26482667
47, 49 and 51, Dyer Street	II	47, 49 and 51, Dyer Street			29 April 1991	SP0264001941; 51°42′58″N 1°57′47″W		1205916	47, 49 and 51, Dyer Street More images	Q26501193
53 and 55, Dyer Street	II	53 and 55, Dyer Street			23 July 1971	SP0265501941; 51°42′58″N 1°57′47″W		1298710	53 and 55, Dyer Street More images	Q26586170
56 and 58, Dyer Street	II	56 and 58, Dyer Street			23 July 1971	SP0256001943; 51°42′58″N 1°57′52″W		1205923	56 and 58, Dyer Street More images	Q26501198
The Limes Waterloo House	II	57, Dyer Street			23 July 1971	SP0266601947; 51°42′58″N 1°57′46″W		1187467	Upload Photo	Q26482668
Gloucester House	II	60, Dyer Street			14 June 1948	SP0258101938; 51°42′58″N 1°57′51″W		1205927	Gloucester House More images	Q26501202
72, Dyer Street	II	72, Dyer Street			14 June 1948	SP0263201923; 51°42′58″N 1°57′48″W		1298711	72, Dyer Street More images	Q26586171
74 Dyer Street (Former Offices Of The Wiltshire And Gloucestershire Standard)	II	74, Dyer Street, GL7 2PW			26 June 2018	SP0263601918; 51°42′58″N 1°57′48″W		1457440	74 Dyer Street (Former Offices Of The Wiltshire And Gloucestershire Standard) More images	Q66479737
76, Dyer Street	II	76, Dyer Street			24 May 1993	SP0264601919; 51°42′58″N 1°57′47″W		1280469	76, Dyer Street More images	Q26569603
78, 80 and 82, Dyer Street	II	78, 80 and 82, Dyer Street			24 May 1993	SP0265701918; 51°42′58″N 1°57′47″W		1187468	78, 80 and 82, Dyer Street More images	Q26482669
86 and 86b, Dyer Street	II	86 and 86b, Dyer Street			8 July 1992	SP0267801919; 51°42′58″N 1°57′45″W		1205934	86 and 86b, Dyer Street More images	Q26501208
Stratton House Hotel	II	Gloucester Road, Stratton			24 May 1993	SP0136603442; 51°43′47″N 1°58′54″W		1187469	Stratton House Hotel More images	Q26482670
The Elms	II	Gloucester Road			24 May 1993	SP0159603254; 51°43′41″N 1°58′42″W		1205949	Upload Photo	Q26501221
Outbuildinng to Number 187	II	Gloucester Street			23 July 1971	SP0193602640; 51°43′21″N 1°58′24″W		1187488	Upload Photo	Q26482687
2 and 4, Gloucester Street	II	2 and 4, Gloucester Street			23 July 1971	SP0213302354; 51°43′12″N 1°58′14″W		1298712	2 and 4, Gloucester Street More images	Q26586172
Powell's School	II*	3 and 5, Gloucester Street			14 June 1948	SP0211502354; 51°43′12″N 1°58′15″W		1280443	Powell's School More images	Q17536800
7, Gloucester Street	II*	7, Gloucester Street			14 June 1948	SP0210102370; 51°43′12″N 1°58′16″W		1187470	7, Gloucester Street More images	Q17536648
The White Lion Inn	II	8, Gloucester Street			14 June 1948	SP0212402378; 51°43′12″N 1°58′14″W		1205971	The White Lion Inn More images	Q26501243
Charlton House	II	10, Gloucester Street			23 July 1971	SP0211702388; 51°43′13″N 1°58′15″W		1205980	Charlton House More images	Q26501250
Corinium Court Hotel and Restaurant	II	12 and 14, Gloucester Street			14 June 1948	SP0210602396; 51°43′13″N 1°58′15″W		1298713	Corinium Court Hotel and Restaurant More images	Q26586173
16 and 18, Gloucester Street	II	16 and 18, Gloucester Street			23 July 1971	SP0209502407; 51°43′13″N 1°58′16″W		1205989	16 and 18, Gloucester Street More images	Q26501259
17, Gloucester Street	II	17, Gloucester Street			24 May 1993	SP0208102354; 51°43′12″N 1°58′17″W		1187471	Upload Photo	Q26482671
19, Gloucester Street	II	19, Gloucester Street			14 June 1948	SP0209002374; 51°43′12″N 1°58′16″W		1205995	Upload Photo	Q26501262
20 and 22, Gloucester Street	II	20 and 22, Gloucester Street			23 July 1971	SP0209002413; 51°43′14″N 1°58′16″W		1187472	20 and 22, Gloucester Street More images	Q26482672
Frontiers	II*	21 and 23, Gloucester Street			14 June 1948	SP0209702379; 51°43′12″N 1°58′16″W		1205997	Frontiers More images	Q17536694
25, Gloucester Street	II	25, Gloucester Street			23 July 1971	SP0208902383; 51°43′13″N 1°58′16″W		1298674	25, Gloucester Street More images	Q26586135
26, Gloucester Street	II	26, Gloucester Street			23 July 1971	SP0208302422; 51°43′14″N 1°58′16″W		1206000	26, Gloucester Street More images	Q26501266
27, Gloucester Street	II	27, Gloucester Street			23 July 1971	SP0208402391; 51°43′13″N 1°58′16″W		1187473	27, Gloucester Street More images	Q26482673
28, Gloucester Street	II	28, Gloucester Street			23 July 1971	SP0207702429; 51°43′14″N 1°58′17″W		1206014	28, Gloucester Street More images	Q26501281
Barton Hall	II	29, Gloucester Street			23 July 1971	SP0206902392; 51°43′13″N 1°58′17″W		1298675	Barton Hall More images	Q26586136
30, Gloucester Street	II	30, Gloucester Street			23 July 1971	SP0207002436; 51°43′14″N 1°58′17″W		1206018	30, Gloucester Street More images	Q26501285
33, Gloucester Street	II*	33, Gloucester Street			14 June 1948	SP0207002412; 51°43′14″N 1°58′17″W		1187474	33, Gloucester Street More images	Q17536652
40, Gloucester Street	II	40, Gloucester Street			23 July 1971	SP0206302444; 51°43′15″N 1°58′18″W		1206019	40, Gloucester Street More images	Q26501286
50, 52 and 54, Gloucester Street	II	50, 52 and 54, Gloucester Street			23 July 1971	SP0205602460; 51°43′15″N 1°58′18″W		1206027	50, 52 and 54, Gloucester Street More images	Q26501292
56 and 58, Gloucester Street	II	56 and 58, Gloucester Street			23 July 1971	SP0204902468; 51°43′15″N 1°58′18″W		1298676	56 and 58, Gloucester Street More images	Q26586137
60, Gloucester Street	II	60, Gloucester Street			23 July 1971	SP0204602473; 51°43′16″N 1°58′18″W		1187475	60, Gloucester Street More images	Q26482674
62, Gloucester Street	II	62, Gloucester Street			23 July 1971	SP0204002479; 51°43′16″N 1°58′19″W		1187476	62, Gloucester Street More images	Q26482675
65, Gloucester Street	II	65, Gloucester Street			23 July 1971	SP0203602450; 51°43′15″N 1°58′19″W		1298677	65, Gloucester Street More images	Q26586138
66, Gloucester Street	II	66, Gloucester Street			23 July 1971	SP0203802487; 51°43′16″N 1°58′19″W		1187477	66, Gloucester Street More images	Q26482676
The Nelson Inn	II	70, Gloucester Street			23 July 1971	SP0203002497; 51°43′16″N 1°58′19″W		1187478	The Nelson Inn More images	Q26482677
74, Gloucester Street	II	74, Gloucester Street			23 July 1971	SP0200602533; 51°43′17″N 1°58′20″W		1187479	74, Gloucester Street More images	Q26482678
76, 78 and 80, Gloucester Street	II	76, 78 and 80, Gloucester Street			23 July 1971	SP0200002542; 51°43′18″N 1°58′21″W		1187480	76, 78 and 80, Gloucester Street More images	Q26482679
82, 84 and 86, Gloucester Street	II	82, 84 and 86, Gloucester Street			23 July 1971	SP0199502556; 51°43′18″N 1°58′21″W		1187481	82, 84 and 86, Gloucester Street More images	Q26482680
83 and 85, Gloucester Street	II	83 and 85, Gloucester Street			23 July 1971	SP0201802489; 51°43′16″N 1°58′20″W		1187482	83 and 85, Gloucester Street More images	Q26482681
87 and 89, Gloucester Street	II	87 and 89, Gloucester Street			23 July 1971	SP0201302497; 51°43′16″N 1°58′20″W		1187483	87 and 89, Gloucester Street More images	Q26482682
88, Gloucester Street	II	88, Gloucester Street			23 July 1971	SP0198402571; 51°43′19″N 1°58′22″W		1280413	88, Gloucester Street More images	Q26569552
91 and 93, Gloucester Street	II	91 and 93, Gloucester Street			23 July 1971	SP0200702505; 51°43′17″N 1°58′20″W		1206066	91 and 93, Gloucester Street More images	Q26501327
96, Gloucester Street	II	96, Gloucester Street			23 July 1971	SP0197502587; 51°43′19″N 1°58′22″W		1298678	96, Gloucester Street More images	Q26586139
97, Gloucester Street	II	97, Gloucester Street			24 May 1993	SP0199802518; 51°43′17″N 1°58′21″W		1280419	97, Gloucester Street More images	Q26569558
99 and 100, Gloucester Street	II	99 and 100, Gloucester Street			23 July 1971	SP0197102596; 51°43′20″N 1°58′22″W		1187484	99 and 100, Gloucester Street More images	Q26482683
The Royal Oak Inn	II	102, Gloucester Street			23 July 1971	SP0196702608; 51°43′20″N 1°58′23″W		1206078	The Royal Oak Inn More images	Q26501339
103, Gloucester Street	II	103, Gloucester Street			23 July 1971	SP0199402521; 51°43′17″N 1°58′21″W		1187485	103, Gloucester Street More images	Q26482684
105 and 105b, Gloucester Street	II*	105 and 105b, Gloucester Street			14 June 1948	SP0199002528; 51°43′17″N 1°58′21″W		1280387	105 and 105b, Gloucester Street More images	Q17536797
107, Gloucester Street	II	107, Gloucester Street			23 July 1971	SP0198702536; 51°43′18″N 1°58′21″W		1298679	107, Gloucester Street More images	Q26586140
Riverside	II	120, Gloucester Street			23 July 1971	SP0197202653; 51°43′21″N 1°58′22″W		1206093	Riverside More images	Q26501353
141, Gloucester Street	II	141, Gloucester Street			23 July 1971	SP0197502554; 51°43′18″N 1°58′22″W		1187486	141, Gloucester Street More images	Q26482685
143, Gloucester Street	II	143, Gloucester Street			23 July 1971	SP0197302559; 51°43′18″N 1°58′22″W		1280392	143, Gloucester Street More images	Q26569532
147, Gloucester Street	II	147, Gloucester Street			23 July 1971	SP0196902564; 51°43′18″N 1°58′22″W		1298680	147, Gloucester Street More images	Q26586141
153, 155 and 157, Gloucester Street	II	153, 155 and 157, Gloucester Street			24 May 1993	SP0196002583; 51°43′19″N 1°58′23″W		1280394	153, 155 and 157, Gloucester Street More images	Q26569534
169 and 173, Gloucester Street	II	169 and 173, Gloucester Street			23 July 1971	SP0195302595; 51°43′19″N 1°58′23″W		1187487	169 and 173, Gloucester Street More images	Q26482686
175 and 177, Gloucester Street	II	175 and 177, Gloucester Street			23 July 1971	SP0194702608; 51°43′20″N 1°58′24″W		1206138	175 and 177, Gloucester Street More images	Q26501394
185, Gloucester Street	II	185, Gloucester Street			23 July 1971	SP0194602615; 51°43′20″N 1°58′24″W		1298681	185, Gloucester Street More images	Q26586142
The Old House	II	187, Gloucester Street			23 July 1971	SP0194702635; 51°43′21″N 1°58′24″W		1206140	The Old House More images	Q26501396
Abbey Wall	II	Gosditch Street			27 May 1971	SP0227202148; 51°43′05″N 1°58′07″W		1298683	Upload Photo	Q26586144
Former Unitarian Chapel	II	Gosditch Street, GL7 2AG			14 June 1948	SP0221602156; 51°43′05″N 1°58′10″W		1280350	Upload Photo	Q26569496
Group of Two Chest Tombs Approximately 15 Metres West of Former Unitarian Chapel	II	Gosditch Street, GL7 2AG			24 May 1993	SP0218202135; 51°43′05″N 1°58′11″W		1206175	Upload Photo	Q26501426
Group of Two Chest Tombs Approximately 4 Metres West of Former Unitarian Chapel	II	Gosditch Street, GL7 2AG			24 May 1993	SP0220602146; 51°43′05″N 1°58′10″W		1187491	Upload Photo	Q26482689
1, Gosditch Street	II	1, Gosditch Street			23 July 1971	SP0226302102; 51°43′04″N 1°58′07″W		1206143	1, Gosditch Street More images	Q26501399
3, Gosditch Street	II*	3, Gosditch Street			14 June 1948	SP0226302110; 51°43′04″N 1°58′07″W		1206144	3, Gosditch Street More images	Q17536700
Gosditch House	II*	5, Gosditch Street			14 June 1948	SP0226402118; 51°43′04″N 1°58′07″W		1187489	Gosditch House More images	Q17536658
7, Gosditch Street	II	7, Gosditch Street			14 June 1948	SP0226302126; 51°43′04″N 1°58′07″W		1206147	7, Gosditch Street More images	Q26501402
9, Gosditch Street	II	9, Gosditch Street			14 June 1948	SP0226202131; 51°43′04″N 1°58′07″W		1298682	9, Gosditch Street More images	Q26586143
Numbers 11 and 11a and Attached Railings	II	Gosditch Street			14 June 1948	SP0225202139; 51°43′05″N 1°58′08″W		1206156	Numbers 11 and 11a and Attached Railings More images	Q26501410
15, Gosditch Street	II	15, Gosditch Street			23 July 1971	SP0224602155; 51°43′05″N 1°58′08″W		1187490	15, Gosditch Street More images	Q26482688
17 and 19, Gosditch Street	II	17 and 19, Gosditch Street			23 July 1971	SP0223802169; 51°43′06″N 1°58′08″W		1206164	17 and 19, Gosditch Street More images	Q26501418
Spital Gate and Attached Cottage	I	Grove Lane			14 June 1948	SP0236902478; 51°43′16″N 1°58′02″W		1187492	Spital Gate and Attached Cottage More images	Q17525686
Former Oakley Hall School Memorial Chapel	II	Highfield Lane			11 January 2012	SP0236500911; 51°42′25″N 1°58′02″W		1407024	Upload Photo	Q26675911
Former School And Attached Railings, Master's Houses, Gates And Gate Piers	II	Lewis Lane			10 February 1993	SP0258501852; 51°42′55″N 1°57′50″W		1187493	Upload Photo	Q26482690
137, 139 And 141, Cricklade Street	II	1-7, Lewis Lane			24 May 1993	SP0241501722; 51°42′51″N 1°57′59″W		1298705	137, 139 And 141, Cricklade Street More images	Q26586165
Twelve Bells and Attached Range of Outbuildings	II	12, Lewis Lane			3 November 1992	SP0246601738; 51°42′52″N 1°57′57″W		1206184	Twelve Bells and Attached Range of Outbuildings More images	Q26501435
14, Lewis Lane	II	14, Lewis Lane			23 July 1971	SP0247801740; 51°42′52″N 1°57′56″W		1298684	Upload Photo	Q26586145
St Johns Almshouses	II	15-21, Lewis Lane			23 July 1971	SP0243901737; 51°42′52″N 1°57′58″W		1206180	Upload Photo	Q26501431
Chester Villa	II	16, Lewis Lane			23 July 1971	SP0248701742; 51°42′52″N 1°57′55″W		1206187	Chester Villa More images	Q26501438
6, 8 and 10, London Road	II	6, 8 and 10, London Road			24 May 1993	SP0285702024; 51°43′01″N 1°57′36″W		1206207	6, 8 and 10, London Road More images	Q26501454
Oxford House	II	15, London Road			14 June 1948	SP0274101969; 51°42′59″N 1°57′42″W		1298685	Oxford House More images	Q26586146
Chest Tomb Approximately 11.8 Metres East Of East End Of Chancel Of Church Of St John Baptist	II	Market Place, GL7 2NX			24 May 1993	SP0235102102; 51°43′04″N 1°58′03″W		1187505	Chest Tomb Approximately 11.8 Metres East Of East End Of Chancel Of Church Of St John Baptist More images	Q26482702
Chest Tomb Approximately 64 Metres East Of Chancel Of Church Of St John Baptist	II	Market Place, GL7 2NX			24 May 1993	SP0240702134; 51°43′05″N 1°58′00″W		1206400	Chest Tomb Approximately 64 Metres East Of Chancel Of Church Of St John Baptist More images	Q26501622
Church Of St John Baptist and Attached Railings And Gates	I	Market Place, GL7 2NX			14 June 1948	SP0231902092; 51°43′03″N 1°58′04″W		1206356	Church Of St John Baptist and Attached Railings And Gates More images	Q5117244
Cirencester War Memorial	II	Market Place, GL7 2PE			10 February 2017	SP0230402062; 51°43′02″N 1°58′05″W		1441574	Cirencester War Memorial More images	Q66478339
Cowley Chest Tomb Approximately 41 Metres East Of Chancel Of Church Of St John Baptist	II	Market Place, GL7 2NX			24 May 1993	SP0237802117; 51°43′04″N 1°58′01″W		1298689	Cowley Chest Tomb Approximately 41 Metres East Of Chancel Of Church Of St John Baptist More images	Q26586149
Group Of Five Chest Tombs Approximately 34.5 Metres East Of Chancel Of Church Of St John Baptist	II	Market Place, GL7 2NX			24 May 1993	SP0237102103; 51°43′04″N 1°58′01″W		1206407	Group Of Five Chest Tombs Approximately 34.5 Metres East Of Chancel Of Church Of St John Baptist More images	Q26501628
Group Of Four Chest Tombs Approximately 62 Metres East Of Chancel Of Church Of St John Baptist	II	Market Place, GL7 2NX			24 May 1993	SP0240402130; 51°43′04″N 1°58′00″W		1187506	Group Of Four Chest Tombs Approximately 62 Metres East Of Chancel Of Church Of St John Baptist More images	Q26482703
Group Of Six Chest Tombs Approximately 26 Metres East Of North East Chapel, Church Of St John Baptist	II	Market Place, GL7 2NX			24 May 1993	SP0235202118; 51°43′04″N 1°58′02″W		1187507	Group Of Six Chest Tombs Approximately 26 Metres East Of North East Chapel, Church Of St John Baptist More images	Q26482705
Group Of Three Chest Tombs Approximately 12 Metres East Of North East Chapel Of Church Of St John Baptist	II	Market Place, GL07 2NX			24 May 1993	SP0234802110; 51°43′04″N 1°58′03″W		1206402	Group Of Three Chest Tombs Approximately 12 Metres East Of North East Chapel Of Church Of St John Baptist More images	Q26501624
Jones Chest Tomb Approximately 41 Metres East Of Chancel Of Church Of St John Baptist	II	Market Place, GL7 2NX			24 May 1993	SP0238002111; 51°43′04″N 1°58′01″W		1206412	Jones Chest Tomb Approximately 41 Metres East Of Chancel Of Church Of St John Baptist More images	Q26501633
Pair Of Chest Tombs Approximately 2 Metres East Of Chancel Of Church Of St John Baptist	II	Market Place, GL7 2NX			24 May 1993	SP0234302094; 51°43′03″N 1°58′03″W		1298690	Pair Of Chest Tombs Approximately 2 Metres East Of Chancel Of Church Of St John Baptist More images	Q26586150
Sarcophagus Approximately 25 Metres East Of North East Chapel Of Church Of St John Baptist	II*	Market Place, GL7 2NX			24 May 1993	SP0235802115; 51°43′04″N 1°58′02″W		1280234	Sarcophagus Approximately 25 Metres East Of North East Chapel Of Church Of St John Baptist More images	Q17536785
1, Market Place	II	1, Market Place			14 June 1948	SP0227602056; 51°43′02″N 1°58′06″W		1206214	1, Market Place More images	Q26501461
Midland Bank and Attached Railings	II	2, Market Place			24 May 1993	SP0229502018; 51°43′01″N 1°58′05″W		1187494	Midland Bank and Attached Railings More images	Q26482691
3, Market Place	II	3, Market Place			14 June 1948	SP0228302057; 51°43′02″N 1°58′06″W		1280339	3, Market Place More images	Q26569486
4, Market Place	II	4, Market Place			2 August 1991	SP0230102024; 51°43′01″N 1°58′05″W		1187495	4, Market Place More images	Q26482692
5, Market Place	II	5, Market Place			14 June 1948	SP0233202071; 51°43′03″N 1°58′04″W		1206229	5, Market Place More images	Q26501476
6, Market Place	II	6, Market Place			24 May 1993	SP0230602026; 51°43′01″N 1°58′05″W		1298686	Upload Photo	Q26586147
7, Market Place	II	7, Market Place			14 June 1948	SP0234002073; 51°43′03″N 1°58′03″W		1187496	7, Market Place More images	Q26482693
9-17, Market Place	II*	9-17, Market Place			14 June 1948	SP0235002069; 51°43′02″N 1°58′03″W		1298687	9-17, Market Place More images	Q17536827
12 And 14, Market Place	II	12-22 (even), Market Place			23 July 1971	SP0234002027; 51°43′01″N 1°58′03″W		1187497	12 And 14, Market Place More images	Q26482694
19 and 21, Market Place	II	19 and 21, Market Place			23 July 1971	SP0236902062; 51°43′02″N 1°58′02″W		1187498	19 and 21, Market Place More images	Q26482695
Kings Head Hotel	II	24, Market Place			23 July 1971	SP0235902024; 51°43′01″N 1°58′02″W		1187499	Kings Head Hotel More images	Q26482696
25 and 27, Market Place	II	25 and 27, Market Place			14 June 1948	SP0238602057; 51°43′02″N 1°58′01″W		1187500	25 and 27, Market Place More images	Q26482697
Corn Hall Buildings	II	26, Market Place			23 July 1971	SP0237502018; 51°43′01″N 1°58′01″W		1187501	Corn Hall Buildings More images	Q26482698
Barclay's Bank	II	28 and 30, Market Place			14 June 1948	SP0238902012; 51°43′01″N 1°58′01″W		1187502	Barclay's Bank More images	Q26482699
34 and 36, Market Place	II	34 and 36, Market Place			14 June 1948	SP0241002012; 51°43′01″N 1°57′59″W		1280270	34 and 36, Market Place More images	Q26569425
37, 37a and 39, Market Place	II	37, 37a and 39, Market Place			23 July 1971	SP0241102045; 51°43′02″N 1°57′59″W		1187503	37, 37a and 39, Market Place More images	Q26482700
23, Market Street	II	23, Market Street			23 July 1971	SP0237702059; 51°43′02″N 1°58′01″W		1298688	23, Market Street More images	Q26586148
38, 38a, 40 and 40a, Market Street	II	38, 38a, 40 and 40a, Market Street			23 July 1971	SP0241902010; 51°43′01″N 1°57′59″W		1206327	38, 38a, 40 and 40a, Market Street More images	Q26501564
Fleece Hotel	II	41 and 43, Market Street			14 June 1948	SP0242502032; 51°43′01″N 1°57′59″W		1187504	Fleece Hotel More images	Q26482701
Cirencester Park Mansion and Attached Offices	II*	Park Lane			14 June 1948	SP0202102032; 51°43′01″N 1°58′20″W		1280239	Cirencester Park Mansion and Attached Offices More images	Q5121868
The Old Grammar School and Forecourt Wall	II*	Park Lane			23 July 1971	SP0209801993; 51°43′00″N 1°58′16″W		1280218	Upload Photo	Q17536777
The Old Police Station	II	2, Park Lane			14 June 1948	SP0209201942; 51°42′58″N 1°58′16″W		1205185	The Old Police Station More images	Q26500550
6, Park Lane	II	6, Park Lane			23 July 1971	SP0208902005; 51°43′00″N 1°58′16″W		1206416	Upload Photo	Q26501637
8-16, Park Lane	II	8-16, Park Lane			14 June 1948	SP0208902022; 51°43′01″N 1°58′16″W		1187508	8-16, Park Lane More images	Q26482707
Dunstall House	II	Park Street			23 July 1971	SP0210102065; 51°43′02″N 1°58′16″W		1187514	Dunstall House More images	Q26482713
Stable Range in Cirencester Park Estate Yard and Attached Mounting Block	II	Park Street			24 May 1993	SP0203102105; 51°43′04″N 1°58′19″W		1280168	Stable Range in Cirencester Park Estate Yard and Attached Mounting Block More images	Q26569334
Number 1 and Attached Railing Bases	II	Park Street			14 June 1948	SP0202202142; 51°43′05″N 1°58′20″W		1298691	Number 1 and Attached Railing Bases More images	Q26586151
2 and 4, Park Street	II	2 and 4, Park Street			14 June 1948	SP0210702043; 51°43′02″N 1°58′15″W		1206437	2 and 4, Park Street More images	Q26501654
3, Park Street	II	3, Park Street			14 June 1948	SP0202402135; 51°43′05″N 1°58′20″W		1187509	3, Park Street More images	Q26482708
3a, Park Street	II	3a, Park Street			14 June 1948	SP0202502130; 51°43′04″N 1°58′20″W		1280205	3a, Park Street More images	Q26569369
5, Park Street	II	5, Park Street			14 June 1948	SP0202902126; 51°43′04″N 1°58′19″W		1187510	5, Park Street More images	Q26482709
6 and 8, Park Street	II	6 and 8, Park Street			23 July 1971	SP0211602044; 51°43′02″N 1°58′15″W		1280215	6 and 8, Park Street More images	Q26569377
7, Park Street	II	7, Park Street			23 July 1971	SP0203602122; 51°43′04″N 1°58′19″W		1298692	7, Park Street More images	Q26586152
Number 9 and Attached Garden Wall	II	9, Park Street			14 June 1948	SP0205302103; 51°43′04″N 1°58′18″W		1187511	Number 9 and Attached Garden Wall More images	Q26482710
10, Park Street	II	10, Park Street			23 July 1971	SP0213002043; 51°43′02″N 1°58′14″W		1280191	10, Park Street More images	Q26569355
11, Park Street	II	11, Park Street			14 June 1948	SP0206202095; 51°43′03″N 1°58′18″W		1298693	11, Park Street More images	Q26586153
12 and 14, Park Street	II	12 and 14, Park Street			14 June 1948	SP0214802041; 51°43′02″N 1°58′13″W		1206495	12 and 14, Park Street More images	Q26501706
15, Park Street	II	15, Park Street			23 July 1971	SP0206802089; 51°43′03″N 1°58′17″W		1206501	Upload Photo	Q26501711
17, Park Street	II	17, Park Street			23 July 1971	SP0207302084; 51°43′03″N 1°58′17″W		1187512	Upload Photo	Q26482711
At the Sign of the Herald Angel	II	19, Park Street			23 July 1971	SP0207802079; 51°43′03″N 1°58′17″W		1206511	Upload Photo	Q26501720
21, Park Street	II	21, Park Street			23 July 1971	SP0208202076; 51°43′03″N 1°58′17″W		1298654	21, Park Street More images	Q26586119
23, Park Street	II	23, Park Street			23 July 1971	SP0208702075; 51°43′03″N 1°58′16″W		1206513	23, Park Street More images	Q26501722
25, Park Street	II	25, Park Street			14 June 1948	SP0209102069; 51°43′02″N 1°58′16″W		1187513	25, Park Street More images	Q26482712
Corinium Museum and Attached Gateway	II	29, Park Street			14 June 1948	SP0213602063; 51°43′02″N 1°58′14″W		1206522	Corinium Museum and Attached Gateway More images	Q26501728
1, Querns Lane	II*	1, Querns Lane			15 September 2010	SP0239701690; 51°42′50″N 1°58′00″W		1393966	1, Querns Lane	Q17537286
3, Querns Lane	II	3, Querns Lane			23 July 1971	SP0238101679; 51°42′50″N 1°58′01″W		1298655	3, Querns Lane More images	Q26586120
7, 9 and 11, Querns Lane	II	7, 9 and 11, Querns Lane			23 July 1971	SP0236101664; 51°42′49″N 1°58′02″W		1206533	7, 9 and 11, Querns Lane More images	Q26501739
Querns School and Attached Garden Wall	II	19, Querns Lane			14 June 1948	SP0235401642; 51°42′49″N 1°58′02″W		1187515	Querns School and Attached Garden Wall More images	Q26482714
Lock Up in Grounds of Cotswold District Council Offices	II	Querns Road			23 July 1971	SP0238901467; 51°42′43″N 1°58′01″W		1187695	Lock Up in Grounds of Cotswold District Council Offices More images	Q26482878
Glebe House	II	School Hill, Stratton			23 July 1971	SP0116803776; 51°43′58″N 1°59′04″W		1206549	Upload Photo	Q26501753
Apsley Hall	II	Sheep Street			27 April 1989	SP0206601811; 51°42′54″N 1°58′17″W		1298657	Upload Photo	Q26586122
Former Railway Station	II	Sheep Street			23 July 1971	SP0205001832; 51°42′55″N 1°58′18″W		1187518	Former Railway Station More images	Q5121873
25 and 25a, Sheep Street	II	25 and 25a, Sheep Street			14 June 1948	SP0210801792; 51°42′53″N 1°58′15″W		1298656	Upload Photo	Q26586121
Kingsleigh and Attached Railing Bases	II	27 and 27a, Sheep Street			14 June 1948	SP0211101773; 51°42′53″N 1°58′15″W		1187516	Upload Photo	Q26482715
29, Sheep Street	II	29, Sheep Street			23 July 1971	SP0212001758; 51°42′52″N 1°58′15″W		1187517	Upload Photo	Q26482716
50 And 52, Querns Lane	II	35, Sheep Street			15 March 1991	SP0221101595; 51°42′47″N 1°58′10″W		1206544	50 And 52, Querns Lane More images	Q26501748
2, Silver Street	II	2, Silver Street			24 May 1993	SP0220402013; 51°43′01″N 1°58′10″W		1298658	Upload Photo	Q26586123
Campden House	II	4 and 6, Silver Street			14 June 1948	SP0219402019; 51°43′01″N 1°58′11″W		1187519	Upload Photo	Q26482718
8,10,12,14,9 And 26A, Silver Street	II	8, 10, 12, 14, 9 and 26a, Silver Street			7 May 1992	SP0216202047; 51°43′02″N 1°58′12″W		1187520	8,10,12,14,9 And 26A, Silver Street More images	Q26482719
Hillside Cottage	II	16, Somerford Road			24 May 1993	SP0221201280; 51°42′37″N 1°58′10″W		1298659	Hillside Cottage More images	Q26586124
Hospital of St John	I	Spitalgate Lane			14 June 1948	SP0215002365; 51°43′12″N 1°58′13″W		1280130	Hospital of St John More images	Q17525702
1, Spitalgate Lane	II	1, Spitalgate Lane			23 July 1971	SP0214002355; 51°43′12″N 1°58′14″W		1187521	1, Spitalgate Lane More images	Q26482720
5,7 And 9, Spitalgate Lane	II	5, 7 and 9, Spitalgate Lane			23 July 1971	SP0216402375; 51°43′12″N 1°58′12″W		1280128	5,7 And 9, Spitalgate Lane More images	Q26569299
White House	II	27, Spitalgate Lane			23 July 1971	SP0217902385; 51°43′13″N 1°58′11″W		1187522	White House More images	Q26482721
Cartshed at the Grange Farm	II	Stratton			24 May 1993	SP0090503898; 51°44′02″N 1°59′18″W		1187410	Upload Photo	Q26482615
Church of St Peter	II*	Stratton			14 June 1948	SP0099603964; 51°44′04″N 1°59′13″W		1187408	Church of St Peter More images	Q17536612
Group of 10 Chest Tombs 1 Metre from South Wall of Nave of Church of St Peter	II	Stratton			24 May 1993	SP0099603955; 51°44′03″N 1°59′13″W		1281009	Upload Photo	Q26570091
Group of 2 Chest Tombs Approximately 8 Metres from South Wall of Chancel of Church of St Peter	II	Stratton			24 May 1993	SP0100803950; 51°44′03″N 1°59′12″W		1204857	Upload Photo	Q26500259
Group of 3 Chest Tombs Approximately 3 Metres from South Wall of Nave of Church of St Peter	II	Stratton			24 May 1993	SP0100403956; 51°44′04″N 1°59′13″W		1298724	Upload Photo	Q26586181
Milestone at NGR SP 015 034	II	A417, Stratton			24 May 1993	SP0148403414; 51°43′46″N 1°58′48″W		1187414	Milestone at NGR SP 015 034 More images	Q26482618
North East Barn and Cartshed Range at the Grange Farm	II	Stratton			28 November 1989	SP0093403904; 51°44′02″N 1°59′16″W		1281014	Upload Photo	Q26570096
North West Barn at Grange Farm	II	Stratton			28 November 1989	SP0088303913; 51°44′02″N 1°59′19″W		1298725	Upload Photo	Q26586182
South East Barn at the Grange Farm	II	Stratton			28 November 1989	SP0091603876; 51°44′01″N 1°59′17″W		1204876	Upload Photo	Q26500276
Stable Range Approximately 20 Metres South West of the Grange	II	Stratton			24 May 1993	SP0094503933; 51°44′03″N 1°59′16″W		1281012	Upload Photo	Q26570094
Stratton End	II	Stratton			14 June 1948	SP0110203683; 51°43′55″N 1°59′08″W		1204868	Upload Photo	Q26500270
The Grange	II	Stratton			14 June 1948	SP0095903973; 51°44′04″N 1°59′15″W		1187409	Upload Photo	Q26482614
Stratton War Memorial	II	Stratton Cemetery, Overley Road, Stratton, GL7 7HS			26 October 2022	SP0112003963; 51°44′04″N 1°59′07″W		1483201	Stratton War Memorial More images	Q126192495
Cirencester Park Wall, Gates, Lodges And Museum Of Roman Antiquities	II*	Tetbury Road			5 June 1969	SP0173601678; 51°42′50″N 1°58′35″W		1187523	Upload Photo	Q99671083
Querns House at Cirencester Hospital	II	Tetbury Road			14 June 1948	SP0179501520; 51°42′45″N 1°58′32″W		1206631	Querns House at Cirencester Hospital More images	Q26501831
Barn Approximately 100 Metres East of Barton House	II	The Barton			23 July 1971	SP0169302340; 51°43′11″N 1°58′37″W		1204878	Barn Approximately 100 Metres East of Barton House More images	Q26500278
Barton Cottage and Attached Stable Range Approxmately 30 Metres North East of Barton House	II	The Barton			24 May 1993	SP0166302368; 51°43′12″N 1°58′38″W		1187412	Barton Cottage and Attached Stable Range Approxmately 30 Metres North East of Barton House More images	Q26482617
Barton House	II	The Barton			14 June 1948	SP0161602326; 51°43′11″N 1°58′41″W		1187411	Barton House More images	Q26482616
Dovecote at Barton House	II	The Barton			23 July 1971	SP0168102292; 51°43′10″N 1°58′37″W		1204879	Dovecote at Barton House More images	Q26500279
Former Dairy 5 Metres East of Barton House	II	The Barton			24 May 1993	SP0163502332; 51°43′11″N 1°58′40″W		1204919	Upload Photo	Q26500316
The Little Mead	II	The Mead			23 July 1971	SP0201102247; 51°43′08″N 1°58′20″W		1187524	The Little Mead More images	Q26482722
15 and 15a, The Waterloo	II	15 and 15a, The Waterloo			24 May 1993	SP0243602085; 51°43′03″N 1°57′58″W		1280119	Upload Photo	Q26569290
Milestone At NGR SP 027 034	II	The Whiteway			24 May 1993	SP0273603427; 51°43′46″N 1°57′42″W		1187525	Upload Photo	Q26482723
Barn and Farmbuildings Range to North of Whiteway Farmhouse	II	The Whiteway			8 September 1987	SP0269103022; 51°43′33″N 1°57′45″W		1206673	Upload Photo	Q26501870
Round Farm Building to North of Whiteway Farmhouse	II	The Whiteway			8 September 1987	SP0274803033; 51°43′34″N 1°57′42″W		1187526	Upload Photo	Q26482724
Whiteway Farmhouse and Adjoining Wall and Railing to South and East	II	The Whiteway			14 May 1990	SP0268802989; 51°43′32″N 1°57′45″W		1206667	Upload Photo	Q26501865
Temperance Hall and Attached Schoolroom	II	Thomas Street			23 July 1971	SP0206802281; 51°43′09″N 1°58′17″W		1206711	Temperance Hall and Attached Schoolroom More images	Q26501907
2, Thomas Street	II	2, Thomas Street			14 June 1948	SP0212602302; 51°43′10″N 1°58′14″W		1280122	2, Thomas Street More images	Q26569293
Weavers Hall	II*	4 and 6, Thomas Street			14 June 1948	SP0212102295; 51°43′10″N 1°58′15″W		1187527	Weavers Hall More images	Q17536664
8 and 8a, Thomas Street	II	8 and 8a, Thomas Street			14 June 1948	SP0210302286; 51°43′09″N 1°58′15″W		1206681	8 and 8a, Thomas Street More images	Q26501878
12, 14 and 16, Thomas Street	II	12, 14 and 16, Thomas Street			23 July 1971	SP0206202259; 51°43′09″N 1°58′18″W		1187528	12, 14 and 16, Thomas Street More images	Q26482725
17, Thomas Street	II	17, Thomas Street			23 July 1971	SP0211902279; 51°43′09″N 1°58′15″W		1206684	17, Thomas Street More images	Q26501881
Mead House	II*	18 and 20, Thomas Street			14 June 1948	SP0202902241; 51°43′08″N 1°58′19″W		1187529	Mead House More images	Q17536672
22, Thomas Street	II*	22, Thomas Street			14 June 1948	SP0200802191; 51°43′06″N 1°58′20″W		1280091	22, Thomas Street More images	Q17536771
24, 26 and 28, Thomas Street	II*	24, 26 and 28, Thomas Street			14 June 1948	SP0199702172; 51°43′06″N 1°58′21″W		1298660	24, 26 and 28, Thomas Street More images	Q17536821
29, Thomas Street	II	29, Thomas Street			14 June 1948	SP0209202257; 51°43′09″N 1°58′16″W		1206701	29, Thomas Street More images	Q26501899
49, Thomas Street	II	49, Thomas Street			23 July 1971	SP0208302252; 51°43′08″N 1°58′16″W		1187530	49, Thomas Street More images	Q26482726
Cirencester Quaker Meeting House And Attached Warden's House	II*	51 and 53, Thomas Street, GL7 2BA			14 June 1948	SP0207702246; 51°43′08″N 1°58′17″W		1206705	Cirencester Quaker Meeting House And Attached Warden's House More images	Q17536709
28-34 Tower Street And Attached Walls	II	28-34, Tower Street, GL7 1EF			24 May 1993	SP0255001779; 51°42′53″N 1°57′52″W		1298661	Upload Photo	Q26586125
Cirencester County Junior School	II	Victoria Road			24 May 1993	SP0285601483; 51°42′43″N 1°57′36″W		1187531	Cirencester County Junior School More images	Q26482727
Cotswold Cottage	II	3, Warermoor Road			9 November 1992	SP0245001683; 51°42′50″N 1°57′57″W		1187532	Upload Photo	Q26482728
Bowly's Pump	II	Watermoor			19 January 1981	SP0244901631; 51°42′48″N 1°57′57″W		1025117	Upload Photo	Q26275925
Church of the Holy Trinity	II*	Watermoor Road			23 July 1971	SP0261101372; 51°42′40″N 1°57′49″W		1025128	Church of the Holy Trinity More images	Q17535853
Cotswold Club and Attached Railings	II	Watermoor Road			24 May 1993	SP0304701079; 51°42′30″N 1°57′26″W		1298663	Cotswold Club and Attached Railings More images	Q26586127
Gates, Doors, Piers And Attached Quadrants Of Wall To Watermoor House	II	Watermoor Road			23 July 1971	SP0256901511; 51°42′44″N 1°57′51″W		1187534	Upload Photo	Q26482730
Watermoor House	II	Watermoor Road			23 July 1971	SP0260801553; 51°42′46″N 1°57′49″W		1025097	Watermoor House More images	Q26275903
2, Watermoor Road	II*	2, Watermoor Road			14 June 1948	SP0240801686; 51°42′50″N 1°58′00″W		1298592	2, Watermoor Road	Q17536817
Bowly's Cottages	II	4-14, Watermoor Road			19 January 1981	SP0244101624; 51°42′48″N 1°57′58″W		1187684	Upload Photo	Q26482869
Bowly's Almshouses	II	5-11, 15-21, Watermoor Road			23 July 1971	SP0246401642; 51°42′49″N 1°57′57″W		1298662	Upload Photo	Q26586126
16-26 Watermoor Road And Attached Wall And Gate Pier	II	16-26, Watermoor Road			23 July 1971	SP0246801576; 51°42′46″N 1°57′56″W		1025239	Upload Photo	Q26275978
Wall, Railings And Gate Pier Attached To Numbers 23 And 25	II	23 and 25, Watermoor Road			19 January 1981	SP0247901623; 51°42′48″N 1°57′56″W		1187533	Upload Photo	Q26482729
32 Watermoor Road	II	32, Watermoor Road, GL7 1JR			11 March 2020	SP0257501429; 51°42′42″N 1°57′51″W		1467655	Upload Photo	Q97464821
High Cross	II	West Market Place			23 July 1971	SP0228302094; 51°43′03″N 1°58′06″W		1025086	High Cross More images	Q17640907
The Crown Public House	II	West Market Place			23 July 1971	SP0224202069; 51°43′02″N 1°58′08″W		1187536	The Crown Public House More images	Q26482732
2 and 4, West Market Place	II	2 and 4, West Market Place			14 June 1948	SP0227702066; 51°43′02″N 1°58′06″W		1025107	2 and 4, West Market Place More images	Q26275914
Oxfam Roxton Sporting Swan Lace	II	3a, West Market Place, 3 and 5, West Market Place			24 May 1993	SP0225702052; 51°43′02″N 1°58′07″W		1298664	Oxfam Roxton Sporting Swan Lace More images	Q26586128
19, West Market Place	II	19, West Market Place			24 May 1993	SP0224402086; 51°43′03″N 1°58′08″W		1355156	19, West Market Place More images	Q26638036
21, 23 and 25, West Market Place	II	21, 23 and 25, West Market Place			23 July 1971	SP0225902092; 51°43′03″N 1°58′07″W		1187535	21, 23 and 25, West Market Place More images	Q26482731
Anglican Cemetery Chapel	II				24 May 1993	SP0144701185; 51°42′34″N 1°58′50″W		1187441	Anglican Cemetery Chapel More images	Q26482643

== See also ==
- Grade I listed buildings in Gloucestershire
- Grade II* listed buildings in Gloucestershire

== Sources ==
- Verey, David; Brooks, Alan (1999), Gloucestershire 1: The Cotswolds, The Buildings of England, New Haven and London: Yale University Press, ISBN 978-0-300-09604-0
