= Painswick Lodge =

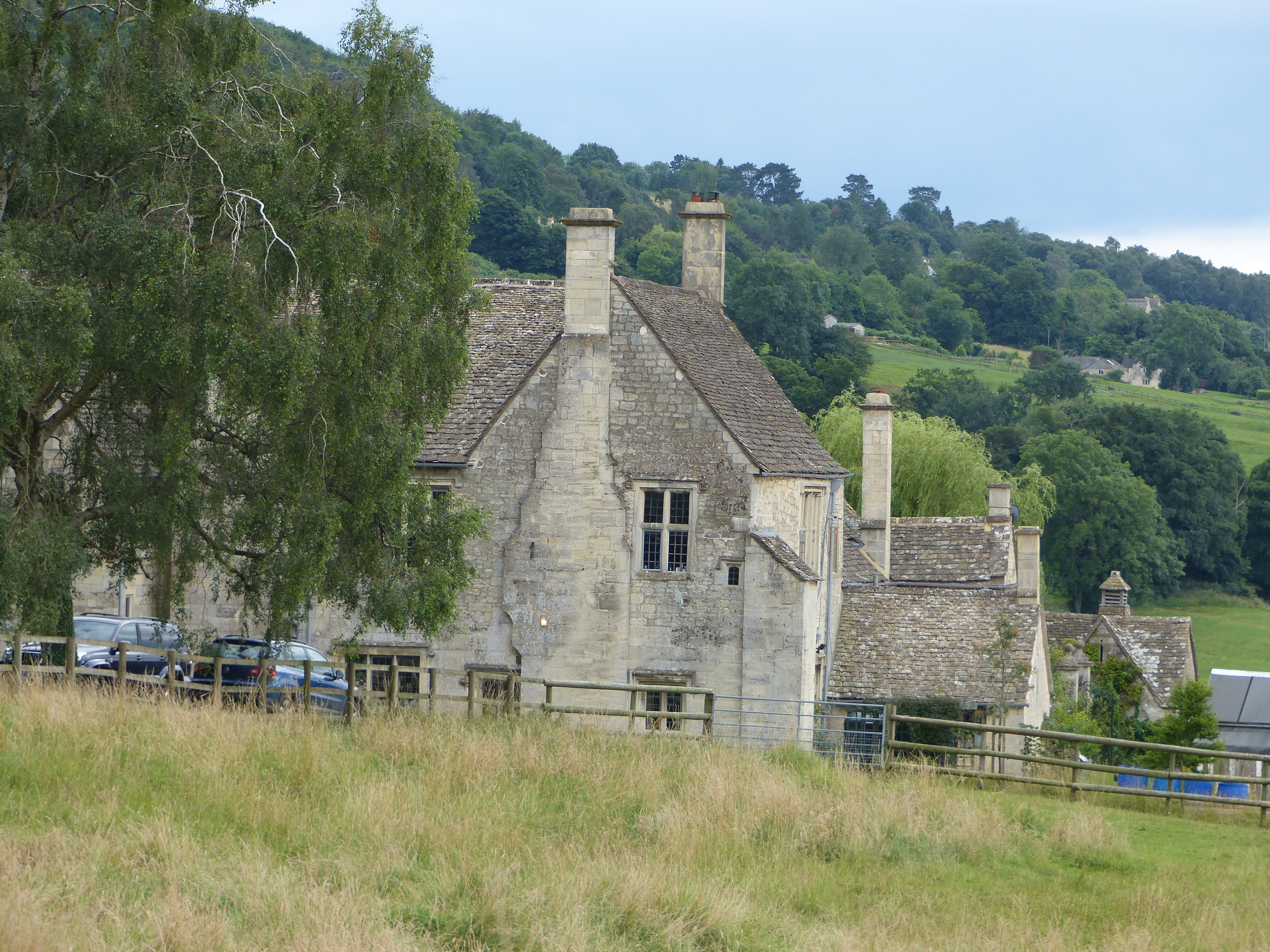

- Location in Gloucestershire
- 51°47′43″N 2°10′24″W
- Location: Painswick, Gloucestershire, England

Listed Building – Grade I
- Official name: Painswick Lodge
- Designated: 21 October 1955
- Reference no.: 1172571

Painswick Lodge is a grade I listed house in Painswick, Gloucestershire, England. The rubble stone building, which has been extensively reworked and remodelled since the 16th century, was home to Lord of the manor of Painswick between 1530 and 1804.

== History ==
There has been an estate at Painswick since at least 1066, when it was held by Ernesi and subsequently Walter de Lacy. It was Pain fitzJohn, a relative of de Lacy, who is the namesake of the village of Painswick and the manor house. Painswick Lodge has been the home of the Lord of the manor for Painswick between 1530 and 1804, when the manorial rights were purchased by Thomas Croome, at which point the manor house for the area was at the nearby Beech Farm. Painswick Lodge was leased to the Bishop of Gloucester for a period in the 16th century.

== House ==
The building appears to date in parts to approximately 1400, but was extensively reworked in the 16th and 17th centuries. The main hall from the 16th century still exists, as do the 17th-century additions. The wings of the building were removed in 1840 and the building went through a restoration in the 20th century.

The building is made of rubble limestone, with a stone slate roof. Originally the building would have had a great hall and courtyard; only two wings remain, with an entry porch into the old hall which now includes a ceiling. The north wing is two storeys high, with a basement and attic. The windows are modified 16th-century mullion windows. To the right of the main entrance is a previous garderobe tower. Inside, the house was subdivided in the 20th century, at least in part by Sidney Barnsley.
