= Beacon House =

Coordinates: 51°47′10″N 2°11′43″W

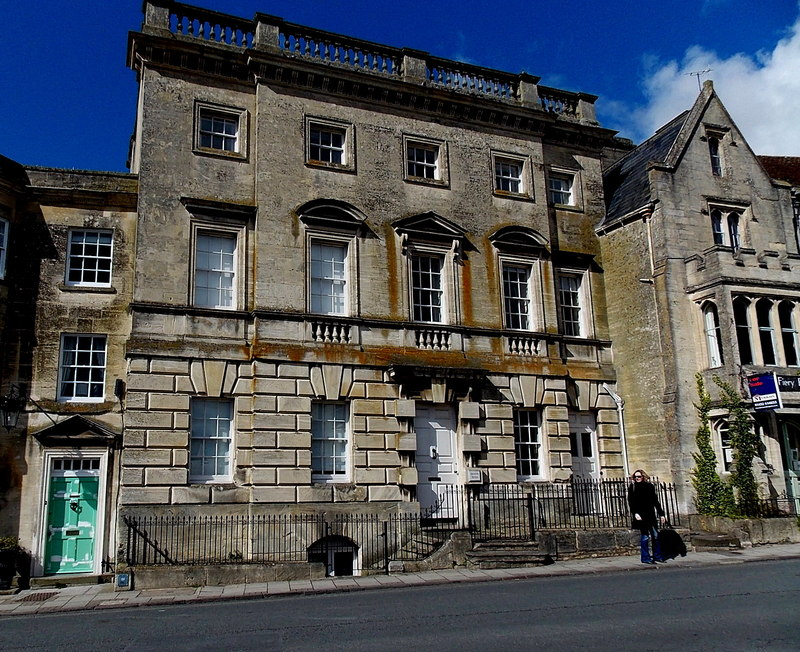
Beacon House

Beacon House is a grade I listed townhouse at New Street, Painswick, Gloucestershire, England.

== History ==
The Palladian house was built in 1766, possibly by John Wood the Younger.

== Architecture ==
The three-storey, three-bay limestone front of the building is topped with a cornice and a baluster parapet. The rococo plaster of the staircase was added by William Stocking. There is extensive plasterwork throughout the house.
