= Court House, Painswick =

Grade I listed house in Gloucestershire, England

Coordinates: 51°47′04″N 2°11′41″W

The Court House is a grade I listed house in Hale Lane, Painswick, Gloucestershire, England, within the Cotswolds.

The house was built in the late 16th century with additions in 1604, for Thomas Gardener on the site of an earlier manor house. The exact dates of the earlier house are not known, but the manor house of Pain fitzJohn, who gave his name to the village, stood on the site in the first half of the 12th century. The demolition of the house in 1445 and subsequent rebuilding is recorded. It is known that King Charles I stayed at the house during the Siege of Gloucester in 1643. The house is still believed to be haunted by the king and his troops.

The Cotswold stone limestone house has a two-storey front with a three-storey return wing supported by buttresses. The name "Court House" relates to the room used as a court with cells in the cellar beneath the rest of the building which held the prisoners awaiting trial. The 4 acres (1.6 ha) garden is surrounded by an 18th-century wall which is 18 metres (59 ft) long and 5 metres (16 ft) high, and includes a set of 11 semicircular steps near the house. Above the roof are stacks of tall chimneys. A path to the parish church crosses the garden.

In 1942 a major sale of the contents of the house was held. The house itself was sold in the 1960s, and again in 2009 as a private house. After extensive renovation the house and its later 20th century additions is now used as a hotel. In 2023 the house was sold again and is now a private residence once more.
