= Stanley Mills =

19th century woollen mill in England

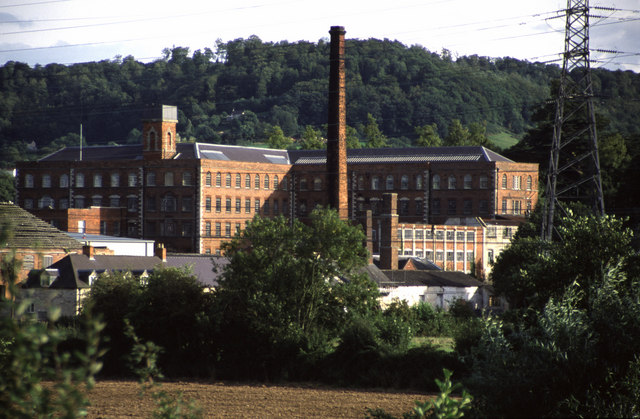

- Location within Gloucestershire
- 51.7366°N 2.2739°W
- Location: Ryeford, King's Stanley, Gloucestershire, England

History
- Built: c. 1825

Listed Building – Grade I
- Official name: Main building at Stanley Mills
- Designated: 28 June 1960
- Reference no.: 1171285

Listed Building – Grade II
- Official name: Power loom shed at Stanley Mills
- Designated: 24 November 1976
- Reference no.: 1090761

Listed Building – Grade II
- Official name: Stanley Lodge at Stanley Mills
- Designated: 24 November 1976
- Reference no.: 1090762

Listed Building – Grade II
- Official name: Ancillary buildings at Stanley Mills
- Designated: 24 November 1976

The Stanley Mills woollen mill at Ryeford, near Stonehouse, Gloucestershire, England was built in the early 19th century. The main building is Grade I listed.

== History ==
There had been mills on the site for many years but the current mill was built in 1813 and expanded around 1825. The mill was powered by water in the River Frome. A lodge house was built for the owners in 1815, at the same time as some ancillary buildings for storage and supply of the mill. It was originally owned by Joseph Wathen who sold it to George Harris and Donald Maclean in 1813 during construction. From 1842, it was owned by the Marling family and their business became a public company known as Marling and Evans in 1920. The mill was originally powered by five waterwheels. A steam engine was added in 1834.

In 1854, a power loom shed was added. In 1884, a fire broke out damaging the roof, but most of the structure survived with minimal damage.

Production at the mill ceased in the 1980s. The main building has been on Historic England's Heritage at Risk register since 2011.

In 2017, plans were announced to turn the mill into apartments and build new houses.

== Architecture ==
The cast iron framing within the L-shaped five-storey main building consists of columns and trusses which hold up red brick vaults proving space for the machinery in what was designed to be a fireproof building. The ironwork came from the Dudley casting works of Bejamin Gibbon and the bricks from the London Brick Company. The materials were transported by water, finishing with the Stroudwater Canal.

The lodge, which was built for the mill owners, has Flemish bond brickwork with limestone dressings. Various ancillary buildings were built of similar materials.

The stone power loom shed is of four storeys and is supported on limestone pillars spanning the river.
