= Frampton Court =

English estate

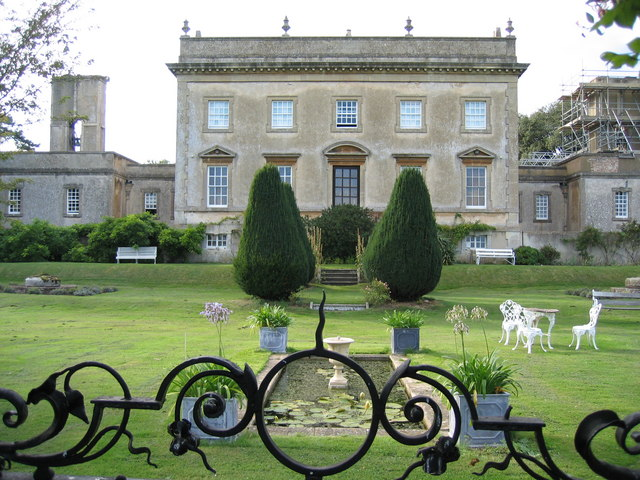
- Frampton Court

- Location in Gloucestershire
- 51°46′04.8″N 02°21′54″W
- Location: Frampton-on-Severn, Gloucestershire, England

Frampton Court is a Grade I listed country house and estate of about 1,500 acres (610 ha) in Frampton-on-Severn, Gloucestershire, England. It has been owned by the Clifford family since the 11th century. The main buildings are the 18th century Frampton Court and, on the opposite side of the village green, Manor Farm. The gardens at Frampton Court have a Gothic orangery and ornamental canal in the style of William Halfpenny. The two houses, barn and orangery are all Grade I listed buildings in their own right, while the Gatepiers and Gates are Grade II* listed.

== History ==
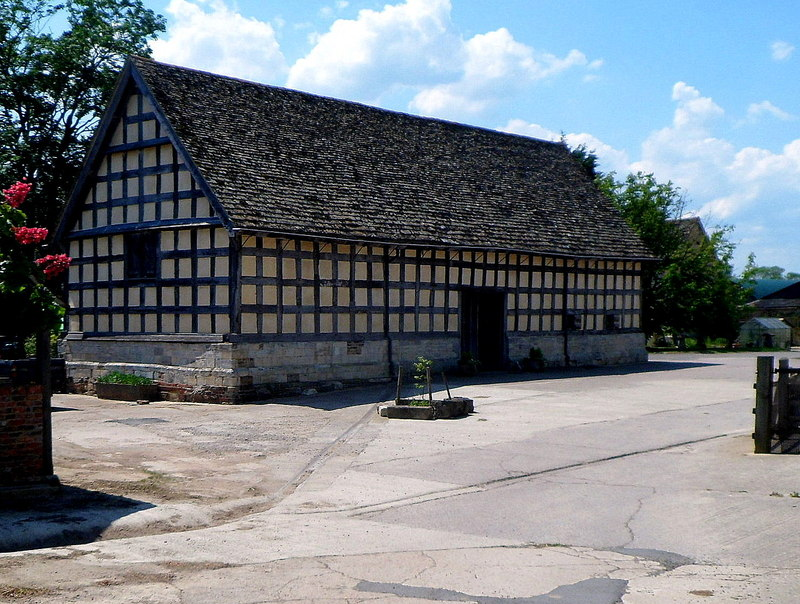
Manor Farm wool barn

The main estate originated from a lease of land granted to William Clifford and his family in 1320. The Feudal barony of Clifford had previously had their seat at Clifford Castle in Herefordshire. A moat once surrounded the original estate, but was built over by John Clifford in 1651 when a new brick house was built. This was rebuilt in 1731 using Bath stone. The architect is not known but may have been John Strahan or Nathaniel Ireson. The gothic garden house and canal were added in the 1750s, when the dovecote may also have been built.

In 1893, the property was put on the market following the death of Henry James Clifford, and described as having ten bedrooms, four dressing rooms, and stabling for up to twelve horses. The Clifford family resumed ownership of the premises in the early 20th century.

Since the 1980s the grounds have been the location for the annual Frampton Country Fair.

== Architecture ==
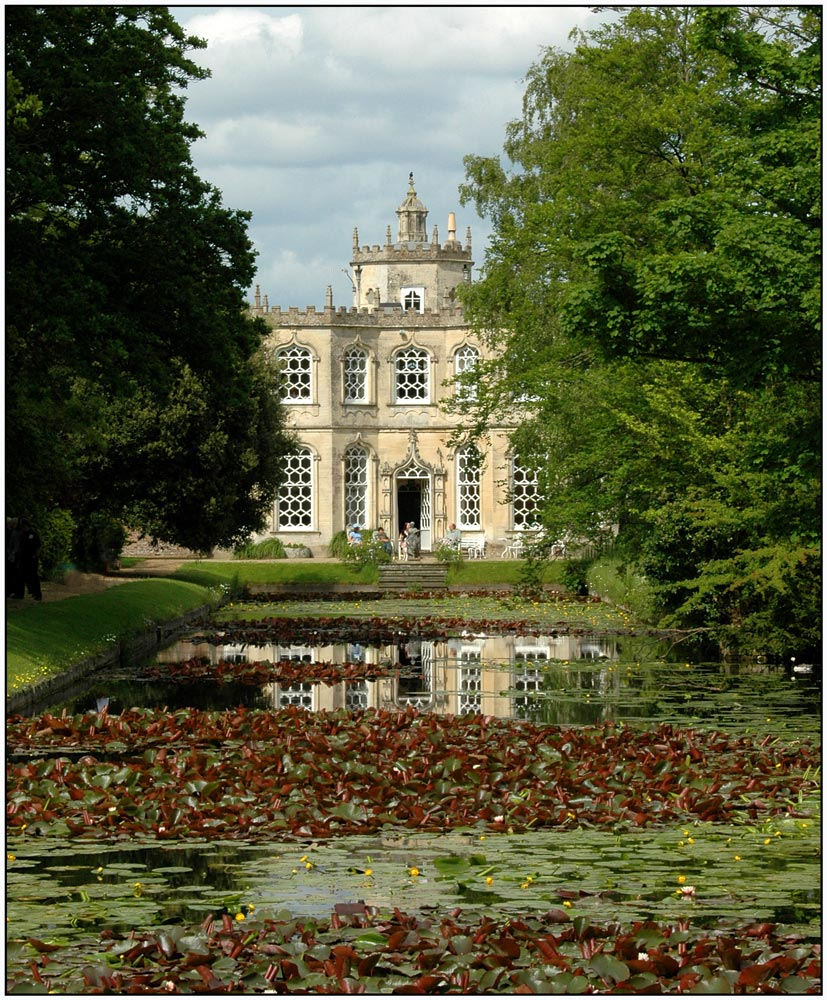
Orangery and canal

The estate is centred on the two principal houses set either side of the Green: Frampton Court, a Palladian house of the early 1730s often attributed to the Bristol architect, John Strahan, and Manor Farmhouse, of the mid-15th century with a contemporary wool barn that was restored by the Cliffords.

The primary building, Frampton Court, is stone built with the symmetrical front of the building having a central pediment with four ionic pilasters. to each side are smaller wings each of which has a chimney stack with an arched opening containing bells. Frampton Court has Jacobean panelled rooms with tiled fireplaces. It holds a collection of 18th century furniture and china. There are also a collection of Victorian watercolours known as the Frampton Flora. These representations of local wild flowers were painted by various members of the Clifford Family in the 19th century.

To the northeast of the main house is Gothic garden house, which is also known as the orangery, which was built in the mid 18th century. It consists of three octagonal towers, the largest of which has a small cupola. They are joined by single bay which has the front door. In front of the building is an ornamental canal, which is 110 metres (360 ft) long and 10 metres (33 ft) wide. The canal may be the remains of the moat around the earlier house. The building was repaired in the 20th century when the effects of an earlier fire were uncovered.

Within the grounds of Frampton Court close to the entrance from the green is an octagonal dovecote dating from the mid 18th century. There is also a granary and store at Manor Farm with a dovecote lantern on the roof.

Manor Farm was built, on the site of an earlier house, in the 15th century and added to in subsequent centuries. It has a courtyard plan with the service wings forming a "U" shape around the courtyard. The timber framing of the building is visible from inside and outside. The interior contains several stone fireplaces, one of which may have been brought into the house from elsewhere. The attached barn may have originally been built as a wool store. The timber-framed building was constructed in the 15th century. The seven bay barn has a flagstone floor and an arch braced roof.

== Gardens and parkland ==
The gardens and surrounding parkland are Grade II* listed on the Register of Historic Parks and Gardens of special historic interest in England.

Earlier gardens were replaced around 1806 from which the walled garden and yew hedges survive. The earlier garden included a parterre and kitchen garden. The current park is approximately 400 metres (1,300 ft) by 300 metres (980 ft) and is mostly grass with trees. South east of the house are lakes which were developed from earlier gravel pits. Surrounding the grounds are stone walls with ornate symmetrical gates and gatepiers.
