= St Nicholas Church, Hardwicke =

St Nicholas Church
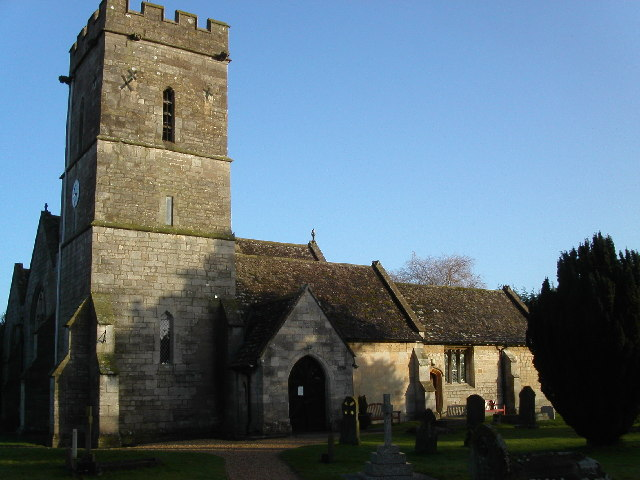
- St Nicholas Church
- 51.8101284°N 2.3029116°W
- Location: Hardwicke, Gloucestershire
- Country: England
- Denomination: Church of England
- Website: http://www.hardwickechurch.info/

History
- Status: Parish church
- Dedication: Saint Nicholas

Architecture
- Functional status: Active
- Heritage designation: Grade I* listed
- Designated: 10 January 1955
- Architectural type: Norman
- Style: Perpendicular

Specifications
- Materials: ~

Administration
- Diocese: Gloucester
- Parish: Hardwicke

Saint Nicholas Church is a grade I listed building located in Hardwicke, Gloucestershire. It practices Christianity through the Church of England denomination.

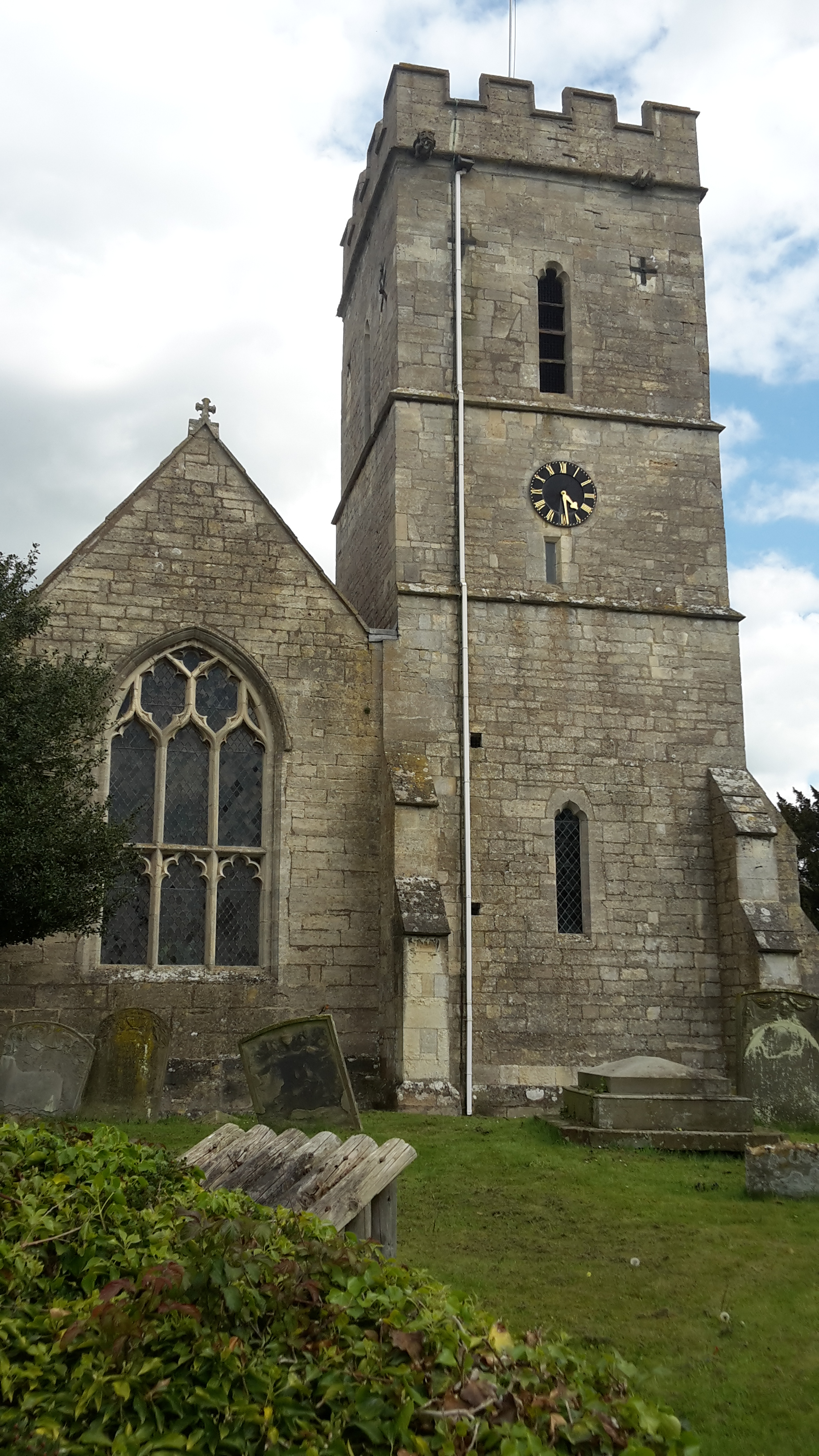
Photo of the Clock Bell Tower

The church is a stone building of the early English and late perpendicular style. It consists of a chancel, a nave, a south facing porch and a wastern tower housing the six church bells and a clock on the western wall. Inside of the church are several monuments of the Trye family. It has a stained glass window on the east-side which is a memorial to Mr and Mrs Fenwick. There are three windows on the west-side one of which is a memorial to Thomas Barwick Lloyd Baker.

== History ==
Hardwicke church was initially a chapel built in 1092, however this may have been built on the foundations of an Anglo-Saxon church. The church is classified as Norman in heritage. The walls of the chancel, common, nave and south aisle were rebuilt in the early thirteenth century. The great altar was consecrated in 1350 by the Bishop of Worcester. Bermondsey Priory sold the church in the late thirteenth or early fourteenth century. The west tower with internal stairs and gargoyles up the parapet and a porch were built in the early fourteenth century. In the late fourteenth century the rood loft and three windows on the west-side and one on the east-side were added. In the fifteenth century, the south chapel was built and two trefoil-headed lights were added on the south-side of the chancel arch. A house was built on the south-side of the churchyard around 1680, It was initially a timber-framed building with a thatched roof, However it has been rebuilt and is now privately owned. The church was named St Nicholas in the late eighteenth century but was previously called St Marys. In 1703, the church had four bells and two more bells were added in 1819 and another in 1896. The church was restored in the 1840s when the nave arcade was replaced and the east end of the chancel was rebuilt incorporating the fourteenth century window. Another more comprehensive restoration and enlargement was carried out in 1878 by Waller and Son of Gloucester. This restoration included the building of the north aisle with a chapel at its east end to house a new organ. At this time, the galleries were also removed and the porch was moved from the north to the south doorway. In 1921, the lychgate to the churchyard was opened as a World War I memorial. In 1927, The tower was restored, and six of the seven bells were kept and rehung. In 1938, The organ was moved from the north chapel to the west end of the north aisle and given a new case.
