= St George's Church, Cam =

Church in Gloucestershire, England

Coordinates: 51°41′32″N 2°21′09″W

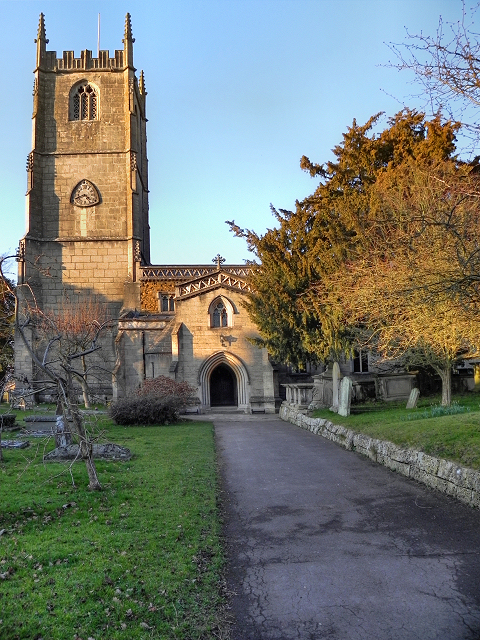
St George's Parish Church

The Church of St George (Church of England) in the village of Cam, Gloucestershire, is an Anglican establishment situated in a slightly elevated position above the village, bordering the market town of Dursley. The mainly mid-14th-century structure is a Grade I listed building and is registered with Historic England. The church operates under the Diocese of Gloucester and is open daily for both visitors and worshippers. The Reverend Fiona Crocker now presides over the church.

== History and architecture ==
A written record of Cam as a settlement appears in Domesday Book of 1086 in the hundred of Berkeley. In 1340, Lord Thomas Berkeley rebuilt the church with only the stone bowl of the font remaining from the previous twelfth century structure. Today the nave, north aisle and bell tower remain from Lord Berkeley's rebuild with the original chancel being rebuilt in 1842. To the exterior above the west door the building is dated. In the angles of the tower, the carved heads of Edward III and Jonathan Thoresby, Bishop of Worcester (the diocese for Cam before the English Reformation) can be found. Above the entrance door, in the spandrils are two small heraldic shield plaques bearing the cross of St George and the other of the Berkeley coat of arms. The Diocese of Gloucester was created at the dissolution of the monasteries under Henry VIII, September 3, 1541, and the advowsons then passed to the Bishop of Gloucester. The adjacent vicarage was erected circa 1590, the now privately owned former rectory is named Bell Court after its Bell-cot built by Thomas Fulljames c.1836 - it is a Grade II Listed Building,. 17th Century additions to the church included the Jacobean oak pulpit and altar table. Between 1991 and 1999 a series of significant restoration and modernisation works were undertaken for the preservation of future generations and for suitable modern use. Today the church plays an active role in the community through offering services, open for individual prayer daily, bell ringing, regular choir, weekly food bank collections, Mother's Union and a Thursday morning cafe etc.

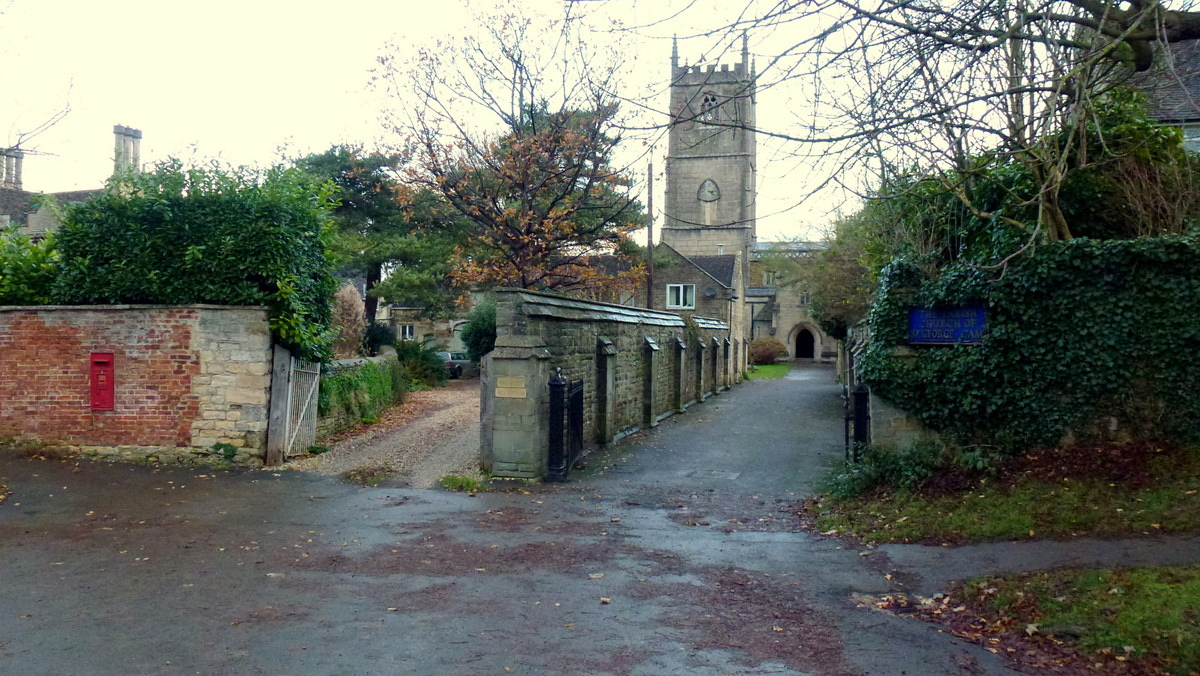
Entrance to the church and the former rectory, Bell Court.
