= St Mary's Church, Berkeley =

Church of St Mary the Virgin
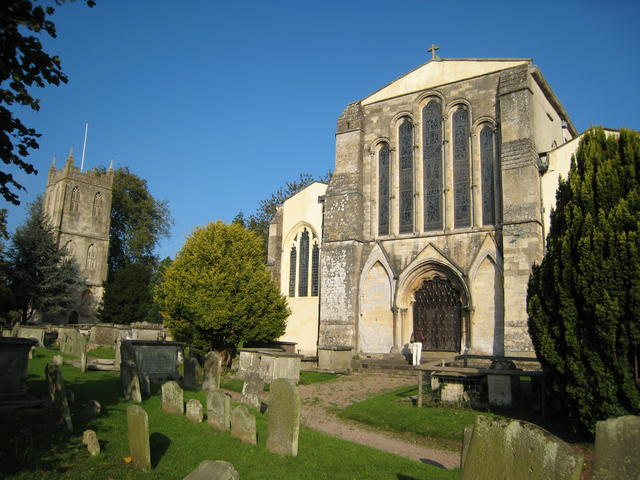
- The west front of the church, with the tower on the left
- Church of St Mary the Virgin
- 51.6892°N 2.4577°W
- OS grid reference: ST 685 990
- Location: Berkeley, Gloucestershire
- Country: England
- Denomination: Church of England
- Website: www.stmarys-berkeley.co.uk

History
- Dedication: Saint Mary the Virgin

Architecture
- Heritage designation: Grade I
- Designated: 30 March 1960

Administration
- Diocese: Diocese of Gloucester
- Parish: Berkeley

The Church of St Mary the Virgin is an Anglican church in Berkeley, Gloucestershire, England, and in the Diocese of Gloucester. The building is Grade I listed; it has a separate tower, also Grade I listed.

== History and description ==
There was probably a Saxon church, since stones reused in the present church have Saxon carving. The present tower, erected in the 18th century, was built on the site of the tower of a medieval church, thought to be where the Saxon building stood.

Robert Fitzharding, in the 12th century, is thought to have built a church on the site of the present church. The south door and the font remain from this building; otherwise the oldest parts of the building date from 1225 to 1250, notably the nave and west front. The west end of the chancel is also of this period; the east end was extended about 1300. During the 14th century the south and north aisles were rebuilt, and the north door was created. The large rood screen is of the 15th century.

The Berkeley burial chapel, built about 1450 by James Berkeley, 11th Baron Berkeley by tenure and 1st Baron Berkeley by writ (c. 1394–1463), is still owned by the Berkeley family and is not open to the public. It is in the south-east corner, in Perpendicular style. There is an ogee crocketed arch over the doorway holding the Berkeley arms.

=== Wall paintings ===
Medieval wall paintings were revealed by removal of whitewash, during restoration of 1865–66 by Clayton and Bell supervised by George Gilbert Scott. There are patterns in red and black, and fragments of a painting over the chancel arch probably representing the Last Judgment. The decoration seen today is largely 19th-century overpainting of the original.

=== Monuments ===
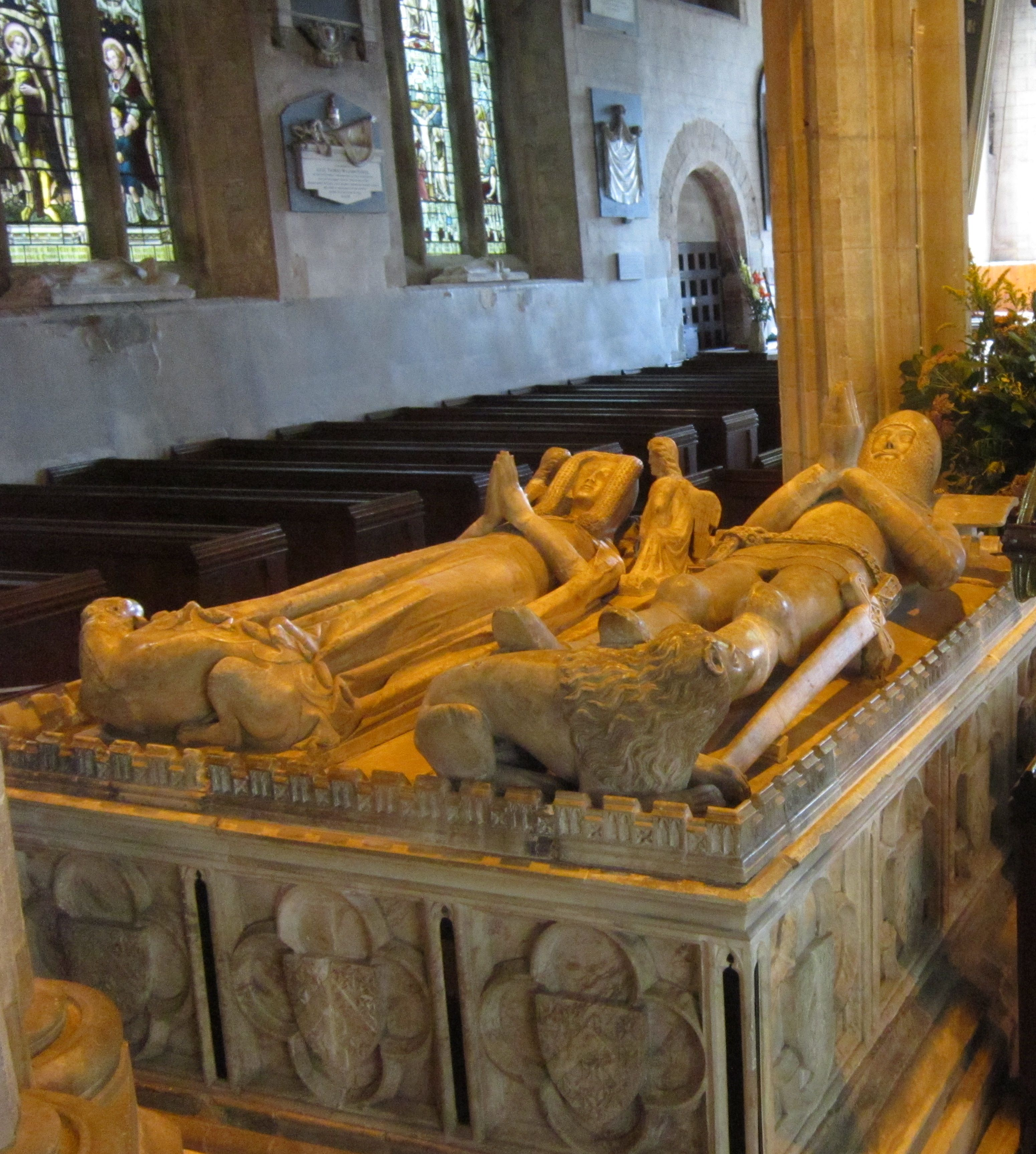
The tomb of Lord Thomas and Lady Katherine Berkeley

The tomb of James Berkeley, 11th Baron Berkeley, and his second son James, is between the chancel and the burial chapel. The tomb of Thomas Berkeley, 8th Baron Berkeley by tenure (died 1361) and his wife Katherine (died 1385) is in the south-east of the nave. There is a memorial tablet to Edward Jenner on the south wall.

=== Tower ===
The separate church tower was built in 1753, on the site of the original tower. It is in Gothic survival style. There are ten bells, on a metal bell frame installed in 1899. The earliest, the 7th (A), was made in 1700; the latest, the treble (G♯) and second (F♯), made in 1921, were given by the Gloucester and Bristol Diocesan Association of Change Ringers as a memorial to members who fell in the Great War.

== See also ==
- Baron Berkeley
