= Grade II* listed buildings in Gloucestershire =

Gloucestershire shown within England

The county of Gloucestershire is divided into seven districts. The districts of Gloucestershire are Gloucester, Tewkesbury, Cheltenham, Cotswold, Stroud, Forest of Dean, South Gloucestershire.

As there are 820 Grade II* listed buildings in the county they have been split into separate lists for each district.

- Grade II* listed buildings in Cheltenham
- Grade II* listed buildings in Cotswold (district)
- Grade II* listed buildings in Forest of Dean
- Grade II* listed buildings in Gloucester
- Grade II* listed buildings in South Gloucestershire
- Grade II* listed buildings in Stroud (district)
- Grade II* listed buildings in Tewkesbury (borough)

== See also ==
- Grade I listed buildings in Gloucestershire
