= Grade I listed buildings in Gloucestershire =

Gloucestershire shown within England

The county of Gloucestershire is divided into seven districts. The districts of Gloucestershire are Gloucester, Tewkesbury, Cheltenham, Cotswold, Stroud, Forest of Dean, South Gloucestershire.

As there are 308 Grade I listed buildings in the county they have been split into separate lists for each district.

- Grade I listed buildings in Cheltenham
- Grade I listed buildings in Cotswold (district)
- Grade I listed buildings in Forest of Dean
- Grade I listed buildings in Gloucester
- Grade I listed buildings in South Gloucestershire
- Grade I listed buildings in Stroud (district)
- Grade I listed buildings in Tewkesbury (borough)

== See also ==
- Grade II* listed buildings in Gloucestershire
