= Hamfallow =

Civil parish in Gloucestershire, England

Coordinates: 51.70°N 2.44°W

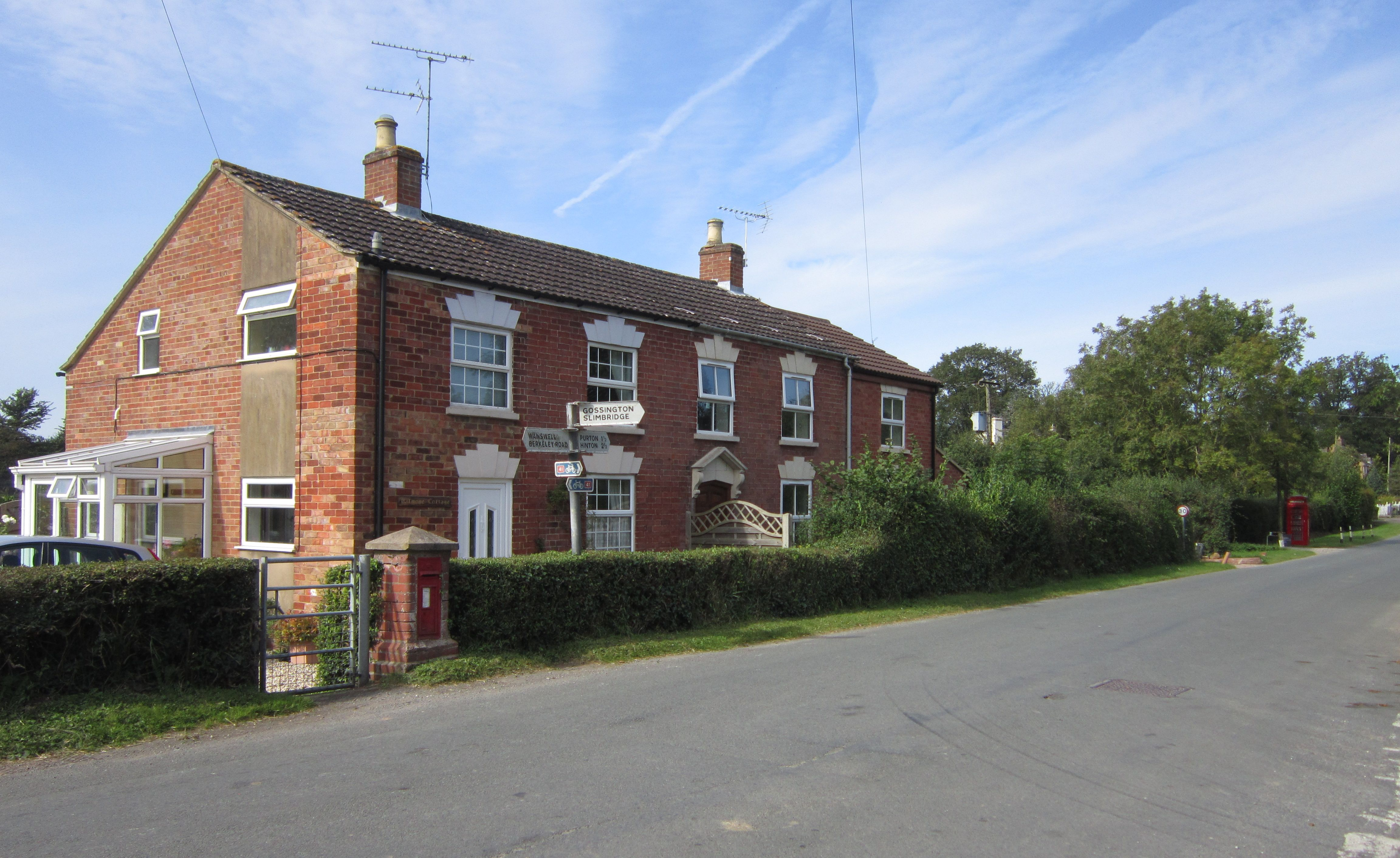
- Halmore crossroads

- Location within Gloucestershire
- Population: 1,064 (as of 2011)
- OS grid reference: SO699021
- Civil parish: Hamfallow
- District: Stroud
- Shire county: Gloucestershire
- Region: South West
- Country: England
- Sovereign state: United Kingdom
- Post town: BERKELEY
- Postcode district: GL13
- Dialling code: 01453
- Police: Gloucestershire
- Fire: Gloucestershire
- Ambulance: South Western
- UK Parliament: Stroud

Hamfallow is a civil parish in the district of Stroud, Gloucestershire. There is no village centre, the parish consists of farms and hamlets such as Abwell, Breadstone, Halmore, Mobley and Wanswell.

The westernmost portion of the parish boundary follows the River Severn, across which is the parish of Lydney in the Forest of Dean district. The other adjoining parishes are all in the Stroud district, these are: Hinton to the north-west; Slimbridge to the north-east; Cam to the east; Stinchcombe to the south-east; Alkington to the south; whilst both Ham and Stone and Berkeley lie to the south-west.

Hamfallow was in Thornbury Rural District until the RDC was abolished in 1974. The greater part was transferred into the new county of Avon, as part of the new district of Northavon but a group of parishes in the north of the district, around Berkeley, wished not to transfer into the new county, but chose instead to remain with Gloucestershire, under the new Stroud District Council. These were the parishes of Hinton, Hamfallow, Ham and Stone, Alkington, and Berkeley itself. With the demise of Avon, in 1996, Hamfallow remained with the main county of Gloucestershire. Today, Hamfallow is represented by the county councillor for Berkeley Vale division and the two district councillors for Berkeley ward on Stroud District Council.
