= Newport, Gloucestershire =

Village in Gloucestershire, England

Coordinates: 51°41′N 2°26′W

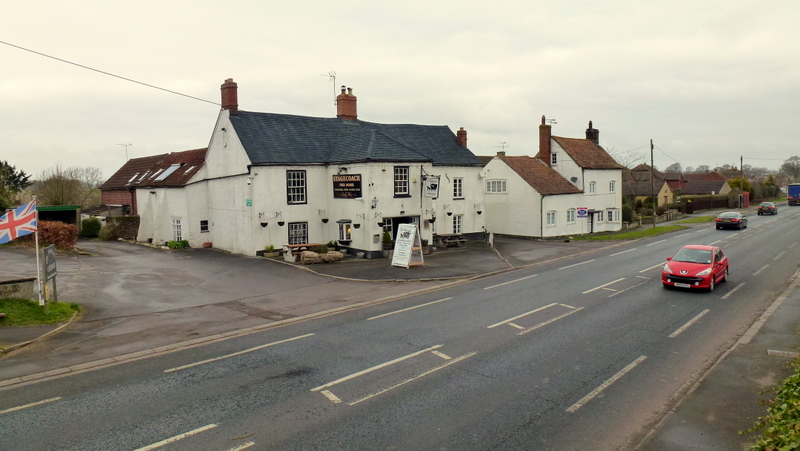
The Stagecoach

Newport is a village in Alkington parish, Gloucestershire, England. Located along the A38 road roughly halfway between Bristol and Gloucester. It is located about a mile south-east of Berkeley and just north of Woodford. It is on the Doverte Brook, a tributary of the Little Avon River. Its pub ('The Stagecoach'), formerly the White Hart, closed in 2021 and is now a Day Nursery. A closed down motel ('The Newport Towers') is being redeveloped as a housing estate, and there is a small non-conformist chapel. The chapel is closed in October 2006 and has been converted into a house. It had a Georgian Interior with hat pegs and galleries and several broken harmoniums. Prior to the advent of the motor car, the journey between Bristol and Gloucestershire took a whole day. It was a perfect staging point for stagecoaches at that time. There were many inns, some catering for the post. The coaches would have a change of horses, the coachmen and passengers having a mid-journey rest stop.
