= George Thorpe (Virginia colonist) =

George Thorpe Esq.
- Born: January 1, 1576; Wanswell Court, Gloucestershire, England
- Died: 1622 (aged 45–46); Berkeley Hundred, Colony of Virginia
- Education: Middle Temple in London
- Spouse(s): Margaret Porter, Margaret Harris
- Relatives: Otho Thorpe

Member of Parliament for Portsmouth
- In office 1614 – 1614

Member of the Virginia Governor's Council
- In office 1620–1622

George Thorpe (baptized 1 January 1576 – d. 22 March 1622 at Berkeley Hundred), was a noted landowner, Member of Parliament, distiller, educator, and major investor in early colonial companies in the Americas.

== Early life ==
Coat of Arms of George Thorpe

George Thorpe was born at Wanswell Court, the family estate in Gloucestershire, England. He was the eldest son of Nicholas Thorpe and his first wife, the former Mary Wilkes, and had two sisters who survived to adulthood. After his mother's death, his father remarried, to Ann Hill Lawrence, who bore sons William and John who survived to adulthood. On 20 February 1598, George Thorpe matriculated at the Middle Temple in London, where he likely studied law. In 1600, his father died, and Thorpe returned to Gloucestershire to handle the estate, as well as supervise the upbringing of his siblings and half-siblings.

== Personal life ==
On 11 July 1600, George Thorpe married Margaret Porter. Although her date of death is unknown, they had no surviving children and she was buried at Berkeley Church on 10 March 1610. Less than a year later, on 21 February 1611, George Thorpe married Margaret, the daughter of David Harris, who survived him. Of their five children, at least two, William and John, lived to maturity.

== Career in England ==
Thorpe reportedly served as a justice of the peace for Gloucestershire from about 1605 to 1618.

In 1614, George Thorpe represented Portsmouth in a short parliamentary session called the Addled Parliament. Also by this date, George Thorpe had become a major investor in the Virginia Company of London, the East India Company and the Somers Isles Company (which established plantations in Bermuda).

By 1620, Thorpe had been appointed as a Gentleman of the King's Privy Chamber. Two years earlier, he and his cousin Sir William Throckmorton, 1st Baronet, as well as Sir George Yeardley, John Smith of Nibley, Richard Beverley and several others formed a partnership called the "Society of Berkeley Hundred" to establish a private plantation in Virginia. They received a patent the following year. He was also related to other prominent colonists at Jamestown, including Sir Thomas Dale, who had established a predecessor company in 1613.

== Virginia Colony ==
In late 1619 Thorpe sailed for the Virginia colony with Captain John Woodlief on the Margaret (of Bristol), and upon arriving celebrated what some called the first Thanksgiving. Although named to the Virginia Council of State (Governor's Council) upon arriving in the colony, and awarded 300 acres of land and 10 male servants for serving as deputy for the College Land (10,000 acres of land to be set aside for a university and Indian school), Thorpe soon returned to England. That trip was brief, perhaps to complete the sale of his English property. Thorpe returned to Virginia in September 1620 with William Tracy, with whom he would jointly govern the Bermuda Hundred, the pair replacing Capt. John Woodlief. However, Tracy died three months later.

Upon returning to Virginia, Thorpe spent considerable time and resources negotiating with and trying to convert the local native Americans. As a gesture of good faith, he had several English mastiffs that the local natives feared put down. Thorpe also constructed a home in the English style for the paramount leader, Opechancanough.

== Educator ==
In 1620, George Thorpe was made the deputy or superintendent in charge of land set aside by the Virginia Company of London for a college and for a school for Native Americans in the colony. The land was on the north bank of the James river where there was a proposed college at Henricus in the "Shire of Henricus", supported by the Church of England. An article describing the "College of Henricus" says: "The first university in America actually was chartered in 1618, and slated for construction on 10,000 riverfront acres in what is now Varina. Enthusiasm for the project ran high in England. London Company records from the time state that King James authorized bishops and clergy in England to make a collection of 15,000 pounds "for the college and university of Virginia." Among early donations to the cause were 1,500 pounds, altar cloths, books, communion silver, a damask tablecloth and "a carpet of crimson velvet." He encouraged Powhatan Indians to send their children to live with English families and it was his own Indian servants who warned him of the 1622 attack.

== Corn whiskey ==
George Thorpe is credited with the distillation of the first batch of whiskey made from corn, a seminal moment for corn whiskey. In the fall of 1620, George Thorpe was said to have distilled a batch of corn beer, and thus made the first samples of what would later become Bourbon whiskey. In a letter, dated December 19, 1620, to John Smith of Nibley, Thorpe reassures his partner of his good health and mentions a "soe good drinke of Indian corne" he has distilled.

== Death and legacy ==
On 22 March 1622, George Thorpe and ten other settlers were killed at Berkeley Hundred in one of many coordinated Indian attacks led by Opechancanough against James River plantations; 347 English men, women and children died in what became known as the Indian massacre of 1622. The inventory of his estate is the earliest known inventory of a Virginia colonist's estate. Although Thorpe was survived by his sons William and John back in England, his kinsman Otto Thorpe became the first family member to sit in the lower house of the colonial legislature, six decades later.

After Thorpe's death, plans for the school were never revived. In 2000, Henrico County erected a historical marker showing the site of the proposed school. The inscription says: "On April 3, 1620, The London Company hired George Thorpe to manage the land and tenants for the proposed "university and college" on 11,000 acres on the north bank of the James River above Henrico Town. The agricultural activities of the tenants supported the school, which was established to Christianize American Indian children and introduce them to English culture. Indian attackers killed Thorpe and 347 Virginia colonists on March 22, 1622, at the beginning of the Anglo-Powhatan Wars. The event brought an end to early efforts to establish a university and college in Henrico."

The College of William & Mary asserts an historical connection to the early attempt to form a college in Henricus. In 1992, "Henricus Colledge" [sic] was revived and dedicated to "Research and Continuing Education on the Judeo-Christian principles fundamental to the Planning, Planting and Purposeful Development of American "Liberty Under Law."

== Bibliography ==
- Fausz, J. Frederick. "George Thorpe, Nemattanew, and the Powhatan Uprising of 1622." Virginia Cavalcade 28 (1979): 110–117.
- Gethyn-Jones, Eric. George Thorpe and the Berkeley Company: A Gloucestershire Enterprise in Virginia. Gloucester, England: Alan Sutton, 1982.
- McCartney, Martha W. Virginia immigrants and adventurers, 1607-1635: a biographical dictionary. Baltimore: Genealogical Pub. Co., 2007. ISBN 978-0-8063-1774-8.
- Morey, Dennis A. J. George Thorpe: Virginia's First Schoolmaster. [Chesterfield, Va.]: Henricus Foundation, 1999.
- Thorpe, Margaret Harris, and John Smyth. Letter, [1622] June 30, to [John] Smith. 1622. Abstract: Asks that Smith continue a loan of money to her as agreed by Smith and George Thorpe (partners in Berkeley Hundred [Va.]).
- Waterhouse, Edward, Henry Briggs, Robert Milbourne, and George Eld. A Declaration of the State of the Colony and Affaires in Virginia.: With a Relation of the Barbarous Massacre in the Time of Peace and League, Treacherously Executed by the Natiue Infidels Vpon the English, 22 March Last. Together with the Names of Those That Were Then Massacred; That Their Lawfull Heyres, by This Notice Giuen, May Take Order for the Inheriting of Their Lands and Estates in Virginia. An a Treatise Annexed. London: Imprinted by G. Eld. for R. Mylbourne, 1622.
- Wolfe, Brendan. "George Thorpe (bap. 1576–1622)." Encyclopedia Virginia. Virginia Foundation for the Humanities, 15 Sep. 2014. Web. 6 Jun. 2015. Retrieved from George Thorpe (bap. 1576–1622).
