= Berkeley Vale =

Berkeley Vale may refer to:

- Berkeley Vale, New South Wales - A suburb on the Central Coast of New South Wales, Australia
- Berkeley Vale, Gloucestershire - An area in Gloucestershire, England
