= Sanigar =

Sanigar is an English surname originating in the Gloucestershire region of England. Documented alternative spellings include Saniger, Sanniger, Senigar and Sinnegar.

The name is medieval and probably derives from a location originally called Swan Hangra near Newtown, Berkeley on the Severn bank, meaning “the place of swans by the sloping wood”, which evolved into Sanigar and variants over time.
