= Breadstone =

Village in Gloucestershire, England

Coordinates: 51.69°N 02.42°W

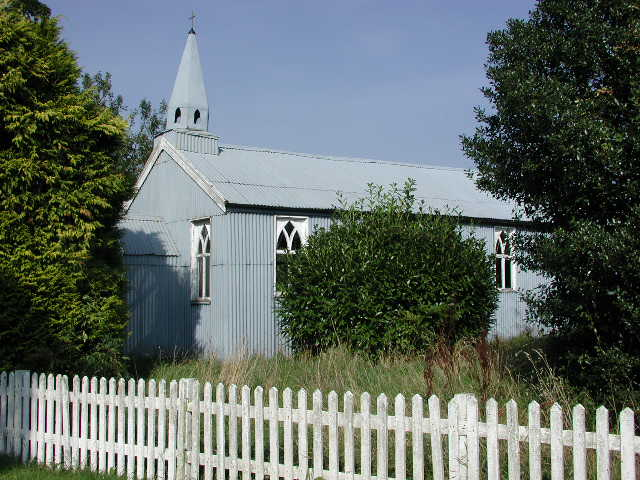
- St Michael's Church in Breadstone

- Location within Gloucestershire
- OS grid reference: SO7100
- Civil parish: Hamfallow
- District: Stroud
- Shire county: Gloucestershire
- Region: South West
- Country: England
- Sovereign state: United Kingdom
- Police: Gloucestershire
- Fire: Gloucestershire
- Ambulance: South Western

Breadstone is a village and former civil parish, now in the parish of Hamfallow, in the Stroud district, in the county of Gloucestershire, England. In 1931, the parish had a population of 95.

== Politics ==
Breadstone was formerly a tything in Berkeley parish, from 1866 Breadstone was a civil parish in its own right until it was abolished on 1 April 1935 and merged with Hamfallow.

The Parish Church of St Michael, constructed from corrugated iron, was demolished in 2006 after falling into disrepair.
