= Horror fiction =

Literary genre

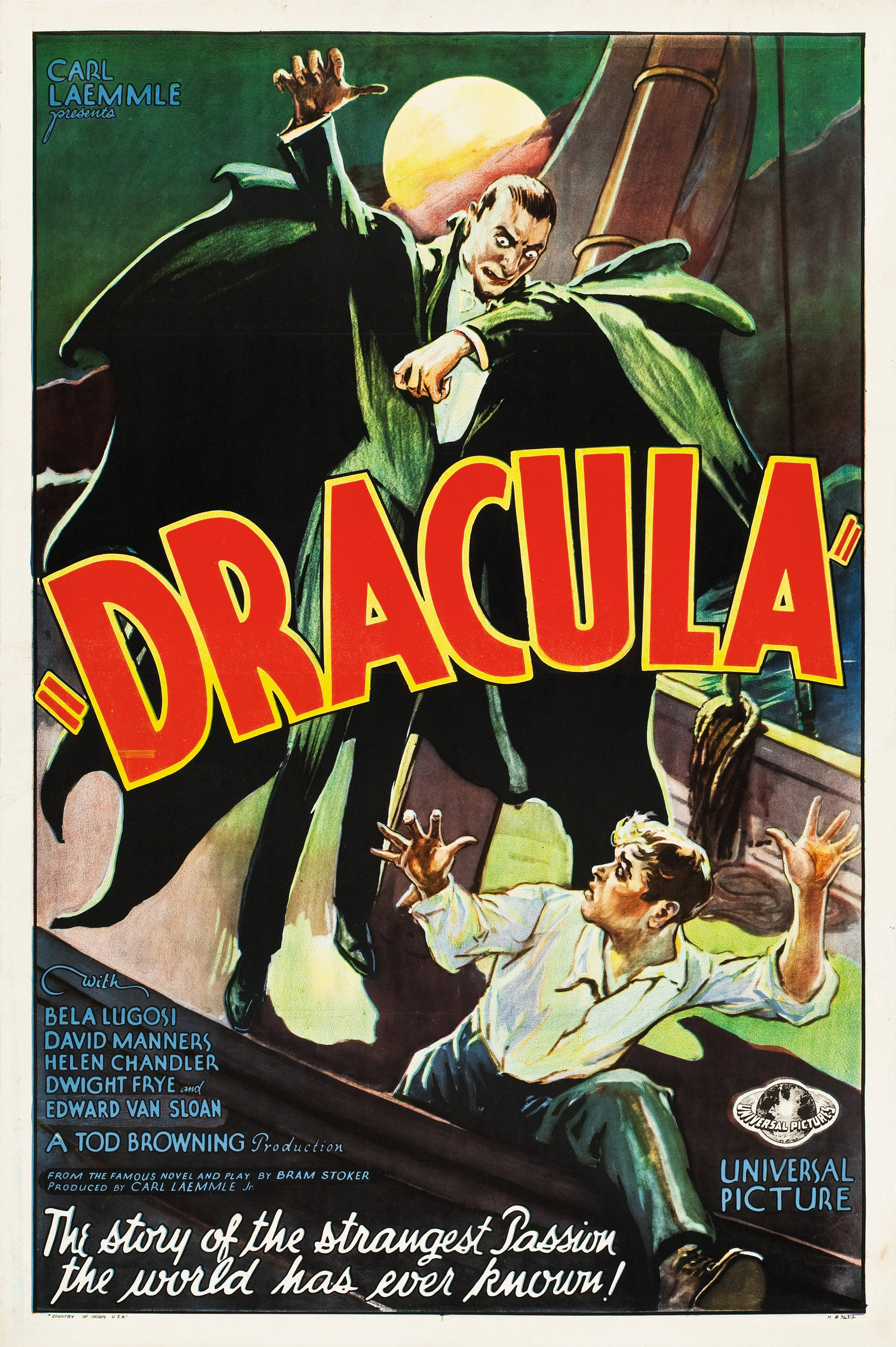
Count Dracula, a vampire who emigrates from Transylvania to England and preys upon the blood of living victims, poster of Dracula (1931)

Horror is a genre of speculative fiction that is intended to disturb, frighten, or scare an audience. Horror is often divided into the sub-genres of psychological horror and supernatural horror. Literary historian J. A. Cuddon, in 1984, defined the horror story as "a piece of fiction in prose of variable length ... which shocks, or even frightens the reader, or perhaps induces a feeling of repulsion or loathing". Horror intends to create an eerie and frightening atmosphere for the reader. The threats present in horror fiction often reflect broader cultural anxieties.

== History ==
=== Before 1000 ===
The horror genre has ancient origins, with roots in folklore and religious traditions focusing on death, the afterlife, evil, the demonic, and the principle of the thing embodied in the person. These manifested in stories of beings such as demons, witches, vampires, werewolves, and ghosts. Some early European horror-fiction came from the Ancient Greeks and Ancient Romans. Mary Shelley's 1818 novel about Frankenstein was greatly influenced by the story of Hippolytus, whom Asclepius revives from death. Euripides wrote plays based on the story, Hippolytos Kalyptomenos and Hippolytus. In Plutarch's Parallel Lives in the account of Cimon, the author describes the spirit of a murderer, Damon, who himself was murdered in a bathhouse in Chaeronea.

Pliny the Younger (61 to c. 113) tells the tale of Athenodorus Cananites, who bought a haunted house in Athens. Athenodorus was cautious since the house seemed inexpensive. While writing a book on philosophy, he was visited by a ghostly figure bound in chains. The figure disappeared in the courtyard; the following day, the magistrates dug in the courtyard and found an unmarked grave.

Elements of the horror genre also occur in Biblical texts, notably in the Book of Revelation.

=== After 1000 ===
The Witch of Berkeley by William of Malmesbury has been viewed as an early horror story. Werewolf stories were popular in medieval French literature. One of Marie de France's twelve lais is a werewolf story titled "Bisclavret".

The Countess Yolande commissioned a werewolf story titled "Guillaume de Palerme". Anonymous writers penned two werewolf stories, "Biclarel" and "Melion".

Much horror fiction derives from the cruellest personages of the 15th century. Previously, Dracula was suggested as being traced to the Prince of Wallachia Vlad III, whose alleged war crimes were published in German pamphlets, though no evidence for this exists in Bram Stoker's notes. A 1499 pamphlet was published by Markus Ayrer which is most notable for its woodcut imagery. The alleged serial-killer sprees of Gilles de Rais have been seen as the presumed inspiration for "Bluebeard". The motif of the vampiress is most notably derived from the real-life noblewoman and murderer Elizabeth Bathory, and helped usher in the emergence of horror fiction in the 18th century, such as through László Turóczi's 1729 book Tragica Historia.

=== 18th century ===
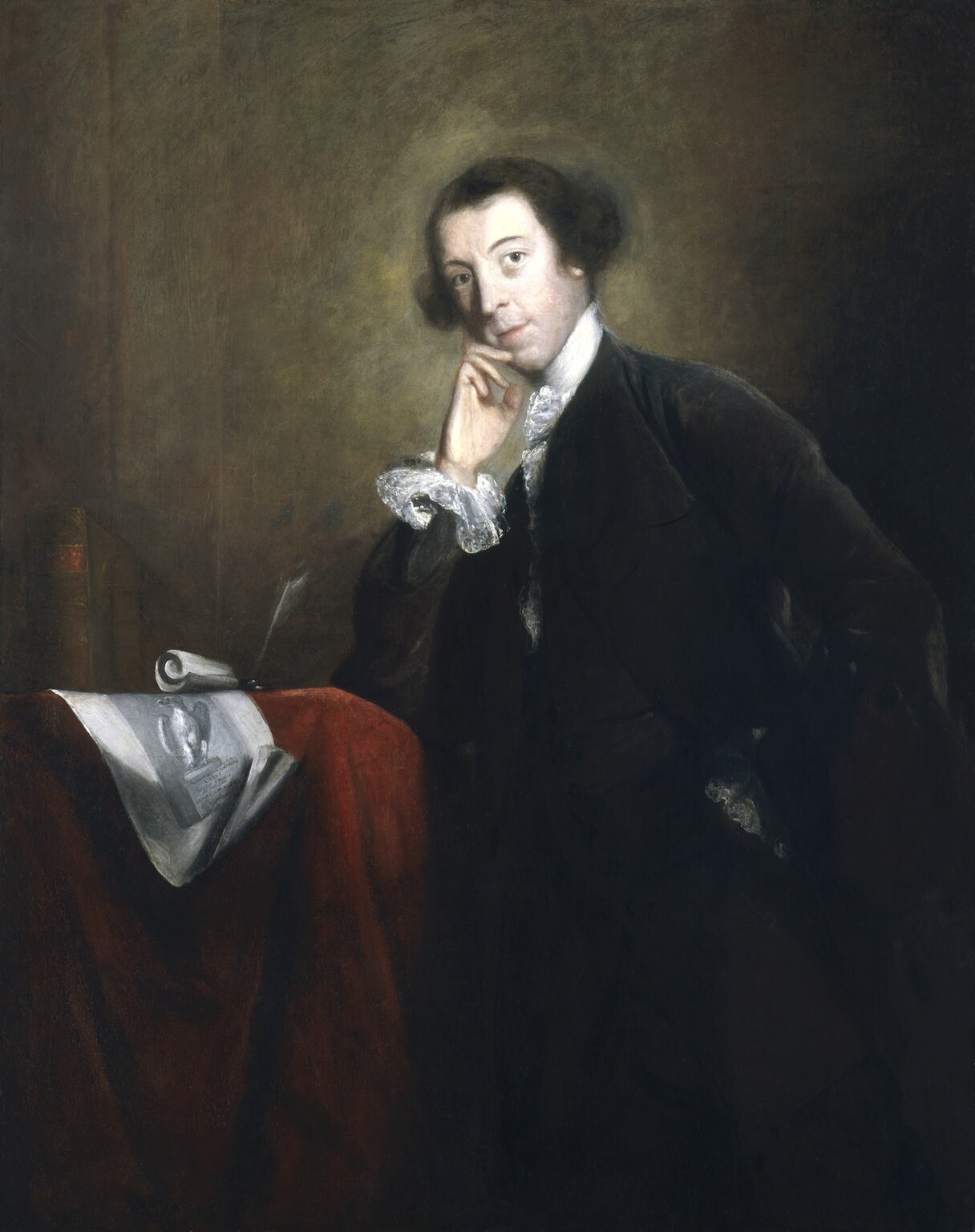
Horace Walpole wrote the first Gothic novel, The Castle of Otranto (1764), initiating a new literary genre.

The 18th century saw the gradual development of Romanticism and the Gothic horror genre. It drew on the written and material heritage of the Late Middle Ages, finding its form with Horace Walpole's seminal and controversial 1764 novel, The Castle of Otranto. In fact, the first edition was published disguised as an actual medieval romance from Italy, discovered and republished by a fictitious translator. Once revealed as modern, many found it anachronistic, reactionary, or simply in poor taste, but it proved immediately popular.

Otranto inspired Vathek (1786) by William Beckford, A Sicilian Romance (1790), The Mysteries of Udolpho (1794), The Italian (1796) by Ann Radcliffe, and The Monk (1797) by Matthew Lewis. A significant amount of horror fiction of this era was written by women and marketed towards a female audience, a typical scenario of the novels being a resourceful female menaced in a gloomy castle.

=== 19th century ===
Mary Shelley by Richard Rothwell (1840–41)

The Gothic tradition blossomed into the genre that modern readers today call horror literature in the 19th century. Influential works and characters that continue resonating in fiction and film today saw their genesis in the Brothers Grimm's "Hänsel und Gretel" (1812), Mary Shelley's Frankenstein; or, The Modern Prometheus (1818), John Polidori's "The Vampyre" (1819), Charles Maturin's Melmoth the Wanderer (1820), Washington Irving's "The Legend of Sleepy Hollow" (1820), Jane C. Loudon's The Mummy!: Or a Tale of the Twenty-Second Century (1827), Victor Hugo's The Hunchback of Notre-Dame (1831), Thomas Peckett Prest's Varney the Vampire (1847), the works of Edgar Allan Poe, the works of Sheridan Le Fanu, Robert Louis Stevenson's Strange Case of Dr Jekyll and Mr Hyde (1886), Oscar Wilde's The Picture of Dorian Gray (1890), Sir Arthur Conan Doyle's "Lot No. 249" (1892), H. G. Wells' The Invisible Man (1897), and Bram Stoker's Dracula (1897). Each of these works created an enduring icon of horror seen in later re-imaginings on the page, stage, and screen.

=== 20th century ===
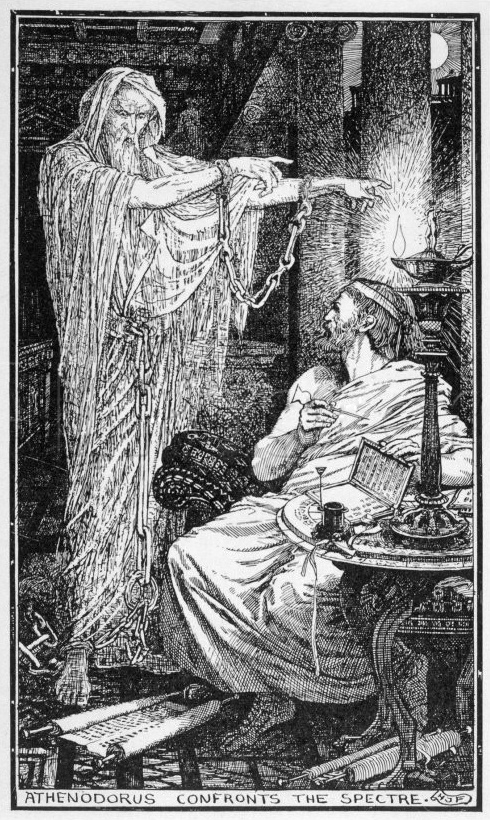
An illustration of Andrew Lang's "Athenodorus, circa 1900, confronts the Spectre"

A proliferation of cheap periodicals around the turn of the century led to a boom in horror writing. For example, Gaston Leroux serialized his Le Fantôme de l'Opéra before it became a novel in 1910. One writer who specialized in horror fiction for mainstream pulps, such as All-Story Magazine, was Tod Robbins, whose fiction deals with themes of madness and cruelty. In Russia, the writer Alexander Belyaev popularized these themes in his story Professor Dowell's Head (1925), in which a mad doctor performs experimental head transplants and reanimations on bodies stolen from the morgue and which was first published as a magazine serial before being turned into a novel. Later, specialist publications emerged to give horror writers an outlet, prominent among them was Weird Tales and Unknown Worlds.

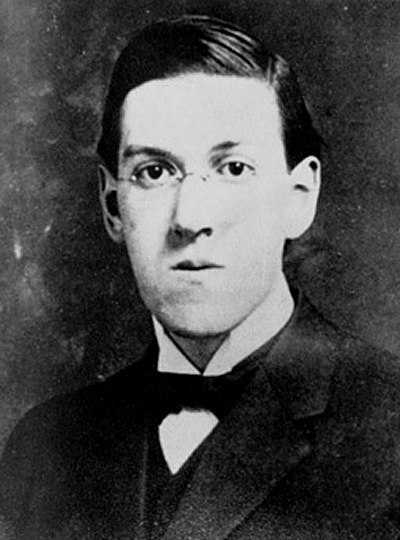
H. P. Lovecraft in 1915

Influential horror writers of the early 20th century made inroads in these media. Particularly, the venerated horror author H. P. Lovecraft, and his enduring Cthulhu Mythos transformed and popularized the genre of cosmic horror, and M. R. James is credited with redefining the ghost story in that era.

The serial murderer became a recurring theme. Yellow journalism and sensationalism of various murderers, such as Jack the Ripper, and lesser so, Carl Panzram, Fritz Haarman, and Albert Fish, all perpetuated this phenomenon. The trend continued in the postwar era, partly renewed after the murders committed by Ed Gein. In 1959, Robert Bloch, inspired by the murders, wrote Psycho. The crimes committed in 1969 by the Manson Family influenced the slasher theme in horror fiction of the 1970s. In 1981, Thomas Harris wrote Red Dragon, introducing Dr. Hannibal Lecter. In 1988, the sequel to that novel, The Silence of the Lambs, was published.

Early cinema was inspired by many aspects of horror literature, and started a strong tradition of horror films and subgenres that continues to this day. Up until the graphic depictions of violence and gore on the screen commonly associated with 1960s and 1970s slasher films and splatter films, comic books such as those published by EC Comics (most notably Tales From The Crypt) in the 1950s satisfied readers' quests for horror imagery that the silver screen could not provide. This imagery made these comics controversial, and as a consequence, they were frequently censored.

The modern zombie tale dealing with the motif of the living dead harks back to works including H. P. Lovecraft's stories "Cool Air" (1925), "In The Vault" (1926), and "The Outsider" (1926), and Dennis Wheatley's "Strange Conflict" (1941). Richard Matheson's novel I Am Legend (1954) influenced an entire genre of apocalyptic zombie fiction emblematized by the films of George A. Romero.

In the late 1960s and early 1970s, the enormous commercial success of three books – Rosemary's Baby (1967) by Ira Levin, The Exorcist by William Peter Blatty, and The Other by Thomas Tryon – encouraged publishers to begin releasing numerous other horror novels, thus creating a "horror boom".

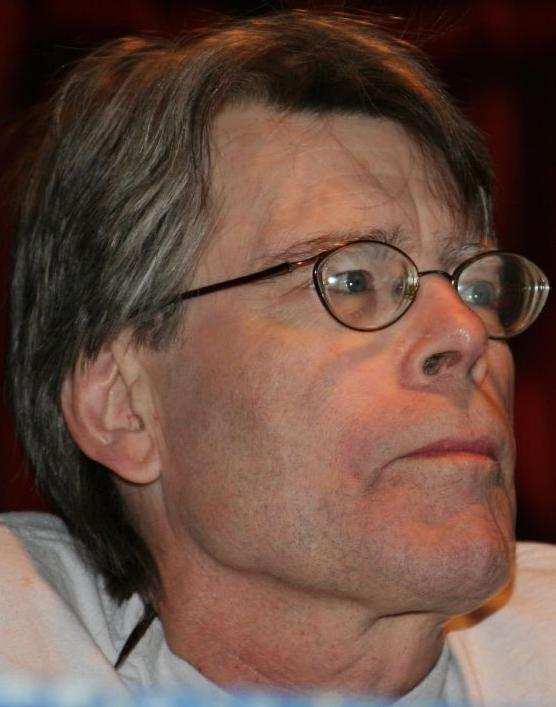
Stephen King in 2007

One of the best-known late-20th century horror writers is Stephen King, known for Carrie, The Shining, It, Misery, and several dozen other novels and about 200 short stories. Beginning in the 1970s, King's stories have attracted a large audience, for which he was awarded by the U.S. National Book Foundation in 2003. Other popular horror authors of the period included Anne Rice, Shaun Hutson, Brian Lumley, Graham Masterton, James Herbert, Dean Koontz, Richard Laymon, Clive Barker, Ramsey Campbell, and Peter Straub.

=== 21st century ===
Best-selling book series of contemporary times exist in genres related to horror fiction, such as the Kitty Norville books by Carrie Vaughn that contain blend werewolf fiction and urban fantasy (2005 onward). Horror elements continue to expand outside the genre. The alternate history of more traditional historical horror in Dan Simmons's 2007 novel The Terror sits on bookstore shelves next to genre mash ups such as Pride and Prejudice and Zombies (2009), and historical fantasy and horror comics such as Hellblazer (1993 onward) and Mike Mignola's Hellboy (1993 onward). Horror also serves as one of the central genres in more complex modern works such as Mark Z. Danielewski's House of Leaves (2000), a finalist for the National Book Award. Like Danielewski, many authors have opted to publish their works online, with notable examples including Ben Drowned by Alex Hall and Candle Cove by Kris Straub. There are many horror novels for children and teens, such as R. L. Stine's Goosebumps series or The Monstrumologist by Rick Yancey. Additionally, many movies for young audiences, particularly animated ones, use horror aesthetics and conventions (for example, ParaNorman). These are what can be collectively referred to as "children's horror". Although it is unknown for sure why children enjoy these movies (as it seems counter-intuitive), it is theorized that it is, in part, grotesque monsters that fascinate kids. Tangential to this, the internalized impact of horror television programs and films on children is rather under-researched, especially when compared to the research done on the similar subject of violence in TV and film's impact on the young mind. What little research there is tends to be inconclusive on the impact that viewing such media has.

== Characteristics ==
One defining trait of the horror genre is that it provokes an emotional, psychological, or physical response within readers that causes them to react with fear. One of H. P. Lovecraft's most famous quotes about the genre is that: "The oldest and strongest emotion of mankind is fear, and the oldest and strongest kind of fear is fear of the unknown." the first sentence from his seminal essay, "Supernatural Horror in Literature". Science fiction historian Darrell Schweitzer has stated, "In the simplest sense, a horror story is one that scares us" and "the true horror story requires a sense of evil, not in necessarily in a theological sense; but the menaces must be truly menacing, life-destroying, and antithetical to happiness."

In her essay "Elements of Aversion", Elizabeth Barrette articulates the need by some for horror tales in a modern world:

The old "fight or flight" reaction of our evolutionary heritage once played a major role in the life of every human. Our ancestors lived and died by it. Then someone invented the fascinating game of civilization, and things began to calm down. Development pushed wilderness back from settled lands. War, crime, and other forms of social violence came with civilization and humans started preying on each other, but by and large daily life calmed down. We began to feel restless, to feel something missing: the excitement of living on the edge, the tension between hunter and hunted. So we told each other stories through the long, dark nights. when the fires burned low, we did our best to scare the daylights out of each other. The rush of adrenaline feels good. Our hearts pound, our breath quickens, and we can imagine ourselves on the edge. Yet we also appreciate the insightful aspects of horror. Sometimes a story intends to shock and disgust, but the best horror intends to rattle our cages and shake us out of our complacency. It makes us think, forces us to confront ideas we might rather ignore, and challenges preconceptions of all kinds. Horror reminds us that the world is not always as safe as it seems, which exercises our mental muscles and reminds us to keep a little healthy caution close at hand.

In a sense similar to the reason a person seeks out the controlled thrill of a roller coaster, readers in the modern era seek out feelings of horror and terror to feel a sense of excitement. However, Barrette adds that horror fiction is one of the few mediums where readers seek out a form of art that forces themselves to confront ideas and images they "might rather ignore to challenge preconceptions of all kinds."

There are many theories as to why people enjoy being scared. For example, "people who like horror films are more likely to score highly for openness to experience, a personality trait linked to intellect and imagination."

It is a now commonly accepted view that the horror elements of Dracula's portrayal of vampirism are metaphors for sexuality in a repressed Victorian era. But this is merely one of many interpretations of the metaphor of Dracula. Jack Halberstam postulates many of these in his essay Technologies of Monstrosity: Bram Stoker's Dracula. He writes:

[The] image of dusty and unused gold, coins from many nations and old unworn jewels, immediately connects Dracula to the old money of a corrupt class, to a kind of piracy of nations and to the worst excesses of the aristocracy.

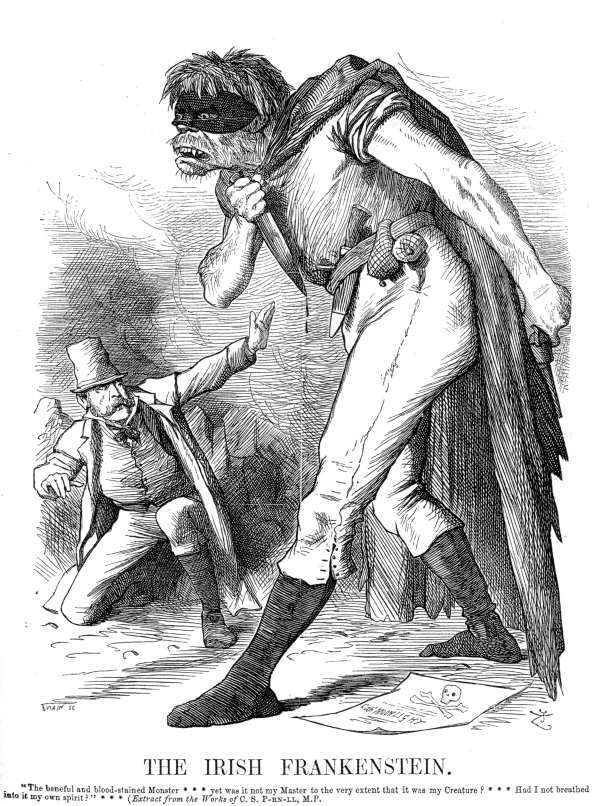
Illustration from an 1882 issue of Punch: An English editorial cartoonist conceives the Irish Fenian movement as akin to Frankenstein's monster, in the wake of the Phoenix Park killings. Menacing villains and monsters in horror literature can often be seen as metaphors for the fears incarnate of a society.

Halberstram articulates a view of Dracula as manifesting the growing perception of the aristocracy as an evil and outdated notion to be defeated. The depiction of a multinational band of protagonists using the latest technologies (such as a telegraph) to quickly share, collate, and act upon new information is what leads to the destruction of the vampire. This is one of many interpretations of the metaphor of only one central figure of the canon of horror fiction, as over a dozen possible metaphors are referenced in the analysis, from the religious to the antisemitic.

Noël Carroll's Philosophy of Horror postulates that a modern piece of horror fiction's "monster", villain, or a more inclusive menace must exhibit the following two traits:

- A menace that is threatening — either physically, psychologically, socially, morally, spiritually, or some combination of the aforementioned.
- A menace that is impure — that violates the generally accepted schemes of cultural categorization. "We consider impure that which is categorically contradictory".

== Scholarship and criticism ==
In addition to those essays and articles shown above, scholarship on horror fiction is almost as old as horror fiction itself. In 1826, the gothic novelist Ann Radcliffe published an essay distinguishing two elements of horror fiction, "terror" and "horror." Whereas terror is a feeling of dread that takes place before an event happens, horror is a feeling of revulsion or disgust after an event has happened. Radcliffe describes terror as that which "expands the soul and awakens the faculties to a high degree of life," whereas horror is described as that which "freezes and nearly annihilates them."

Modern scholarship on horror fiction draws upon a range of sources. In their historical studies of the gothic novel, both Devendra Varma and S. L. Varnado make reference to the theologian Rudolf Otto, whose concept of the "numinous" was originally used to describe religious experience.

A recent survey reports how often horror media is consumed:

To assess frequency of horror consumption, we asked respondents the following question: "In the past year, about how often have you used horror media (for example, horror literature, film, and video games) for entertainment?" 11.3% said "Never," 7.5% "Once," 28.9% "Several times," 14.1% "Once a month," 20.8% "Several times a month," 7.3% "Once a week," and 10.2% "Several times a week." Evidently, then, most respondents (81.3%) claimed to use horror media several times a year or more often. Unsurprisingly, there is a strong correlation between liking and frequency of use (r=.79, p<.0001).

In 2025, the Chicago Tribune designated librarian Becky Spratford as the Chicagoan of the Year in Books, for what Christopher Borrelli described as a "career tirelessly nudging horror literature into the American mainstream." Spratford has written three textbooks on horror, added a horror column to Library Journal, and held roles with the Shirley Jackson Awards, the Horror Writers Association, and the Bram Stoker Awards.

== Awards and associations ==
Achievements in horror fiction are recognized by numerous awards. The Horror Writers Association presents the Bram Stoker Awards for Superior Achievement, named in honor of Bram Stoker, author of the seminal horror novel Dracula. The Australian Horror Writers Association presents annual Australian Shadows Awards. The International Horror Guild Award was presented annually to works of horror and dark fantasy from 1995 to 2008. The Shirley Jackson Awards are literary awards for outstanding achievement in the literature of psychological suspense, horror, and the dark fantastic works. Other important awards for horror literature are included as subcategories within general awards for fantasy and science fiction in such awards as the Aurealis Award.

== Alternative terms ==
Some writers of fiction normally classified as "horror" tend to dislike the term, considering it too lurid. They instead use the terms dark fantasy or Gothic fantasy for supernatural horror, or "psychological thriller" for non-supernatural horror.

== See also ==
- Related genres
  - Christmas horror
  - Crime fiction
  - Dark fantasy
  - Death metal
  - Ghost stories
  - Gothic fiction
  - Monster literature
  - Mystery fiction
  - Speculative fiction
  - Thriller
  - Weird fiction
  - Analog horror
  - Space horror
- History of horror films
- Horror convention
- Horror film
- Horror game
- Horror podcast
- LGBTQ themes in horror fiction
- List of ghost films
- List of horror fiction writers
- List of horror podcasts
- List of horror television programs
