= Alkington =

Alkington could refer to a number of English settlements:

- Alkington, Shropshire, a village and civil parish in Shropshire
- Alkington, Gloucestershire, a civil parish in Gloucestershire

== See also ==
- Alkrington, a district of Greater Manchester
