= SGS Berkeley Green UTC =

Location
- Gloucestershire Science and Technology Park, Berkeley GL13 9PA; England; 51.6916°N 2.4975°W

Information
- Type: University technical college
- Established: 2017
- Local authority: Gloucestershire
- Department for Education URN: 144761 Tables
- Ofsted: Reports
- Headteacher: Gareth Lister
- Age: 14 to 18
- Enrolment: 294 (September 2023)
- Local affiliations: SGS Academy Trust
- Website: www.berkeleygreenutc.org.uk

SGS Berkeley Green UTC is a university technical college in Berkeley, Gloucestershire, England. It opened in September 2017, and is part of SGS Academy Trust (South Gloucestershire and Stroud Academy Trust). It specialises in engineering, cybersecurity and digital technologies, as well as STEM more broadly.

The UTC's sponsors include the University of Gloucestershire, Microsoft, Cisco, CGI, GCHQ, the NCSC, and SGS College. The college was formally opened by Princess Anne on 5 February 2019.

From March 2019 to May 2021, the UTC was the home of the Bloodhound LSR (land speed record) project. The vehicle was then moved to the Coventry Transport Museum, due to lack of funding for further development.
