= Vale of Berkeley =

Rural area in south-west England

Coordinates: 51°41′0″N 2°21′0″W

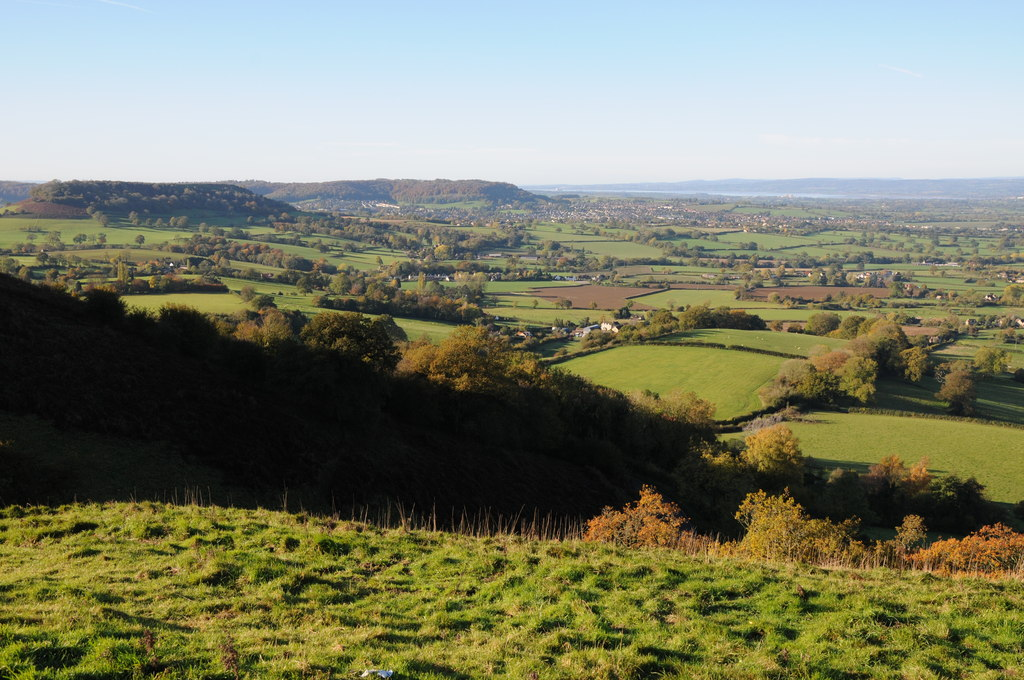
View from Frocester Hill

The Vale of Berkeley (sometimes known as Berkeley Vale) is an area in Gloucestershire, England. It lies between the River Severn and the Cotswold Edge, north of Bristol and south of Gloucester. It includes the towns of Berkeley, Thornbury, Cam, Dursley, Wotton-under-Edge and surrounding villages.

Vale of Berkeley College was a comprehensive school at Wanswell, just north of Berkeley, which closed in 2010.

The Vale of Berkeley Railway is a heritage line, with hopes to reopen the Sharpness branch line.

== History ==
The Vale of Berkeley was originally inhabited by a British tribe called the Dobuni during pre-Roman Britain. During 45 AD, the Roman general Aulus Plautius made a treaty with the Dobuni for peace from the Catuvellauni in exchange for submission to the Roman Empire.
