= Wanswell =

Village in Gloucestershire, England

Coordinates: 51.71°N 02.46°W

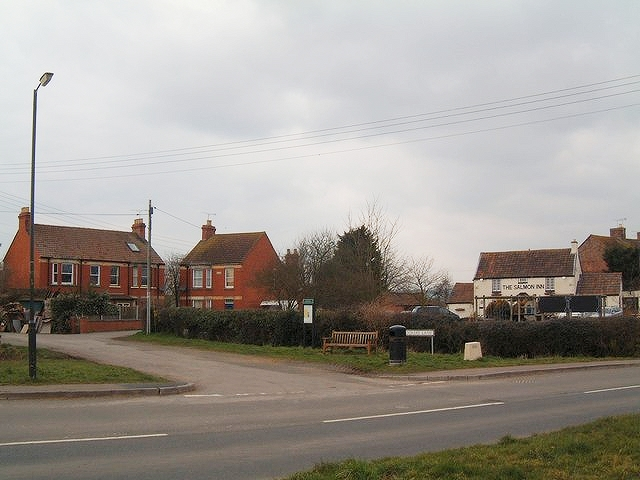

- Location within Gloucestershire
- OS grid reference: SO6801
- Civil parish: Hamfallow
- District: Stroud
- Shire county: Gloucestershire
- Region: South West
- Country: England
- Sovereign state: United Kingdom
- Post town: BERKELEY
- Postcode district: GL13
- Dialling code: 01453
- Police: Gloucestershire
- Fire: Gloucestershire
- Ambulance: South Western
- UK Parliament: Stroud

Wanswell is a village in the civil parish of Hamfallow, in the Stroud district, in Gloucestershire, England. It lies 1.2 miles (1.9 km) north of the small town of Berkeley.

The name was first recorded in the 12th century. It refers to a well which has been identified with the spring now known as Holywell Spring, 300 yards north of Wanswell Court. The first element of the name is possibly an Old English personal name.

Wanswell Court dates back to a hall house built in 1450-60, with additions in the 16th and 17th century. It was the family home of the Thorpe family, and George Thorpe, an early colonist in Virginia, was born here in 1576. The house is now a farmhouse. It is a Grade I listed building, listed in 1952. Wanswell Court lies on an island surrounded by a moat which pre-dates the house. The moat and a nearby fishpond are a scheduled monument.

The village has a pub, the Salmon Inn, which dates back to the 16th century.

The Focus School Berkeley Campus, part of the Focus Learning Trust associated with the Plymouth Brethren, occupies a site in the village formerly occupied by the Vale of Berkeley College, a small comprehensive school which closed in July 2011.
