= Lower Wick =

Hamlet in Gloucestershire, England

Coordinates: 51°39′59″N 2°25′11″W

- Location within Gloucestershire
- Civil parish: Alkington
- District: Stroud
- Shire county: Gloucestershire
- Region: South West
- Country: England
- Sovereign state: United Kingdom
- Post town: Dursley
- Postcode district: GL11
- Police: Gloucestershire
- Fire: Gloucestershire
- Ambulance: South Western
- UK Parliament: Stroud

Lower Wick is a small hamlet located in the county of Gloucestershire, England. It is situated about five miles south west of Dursley, eighteen miles southwest of Gloucester and fifteen miles northeast of Bristol. Lower Wick is within the civil parish of Alkington.

The hamlet contains approximately 17 homes (including the old school house, now converted into a dwelling) and a restaurant. Most of the older properties were built by the Berkeley family who once owned much of the land.

One of the farms in the hamlet still has a working wind pump in use today which is over one hundred years old.
