= Berkeley Town Hall =

Municipal building in Berkeley, Gloucestershire, England

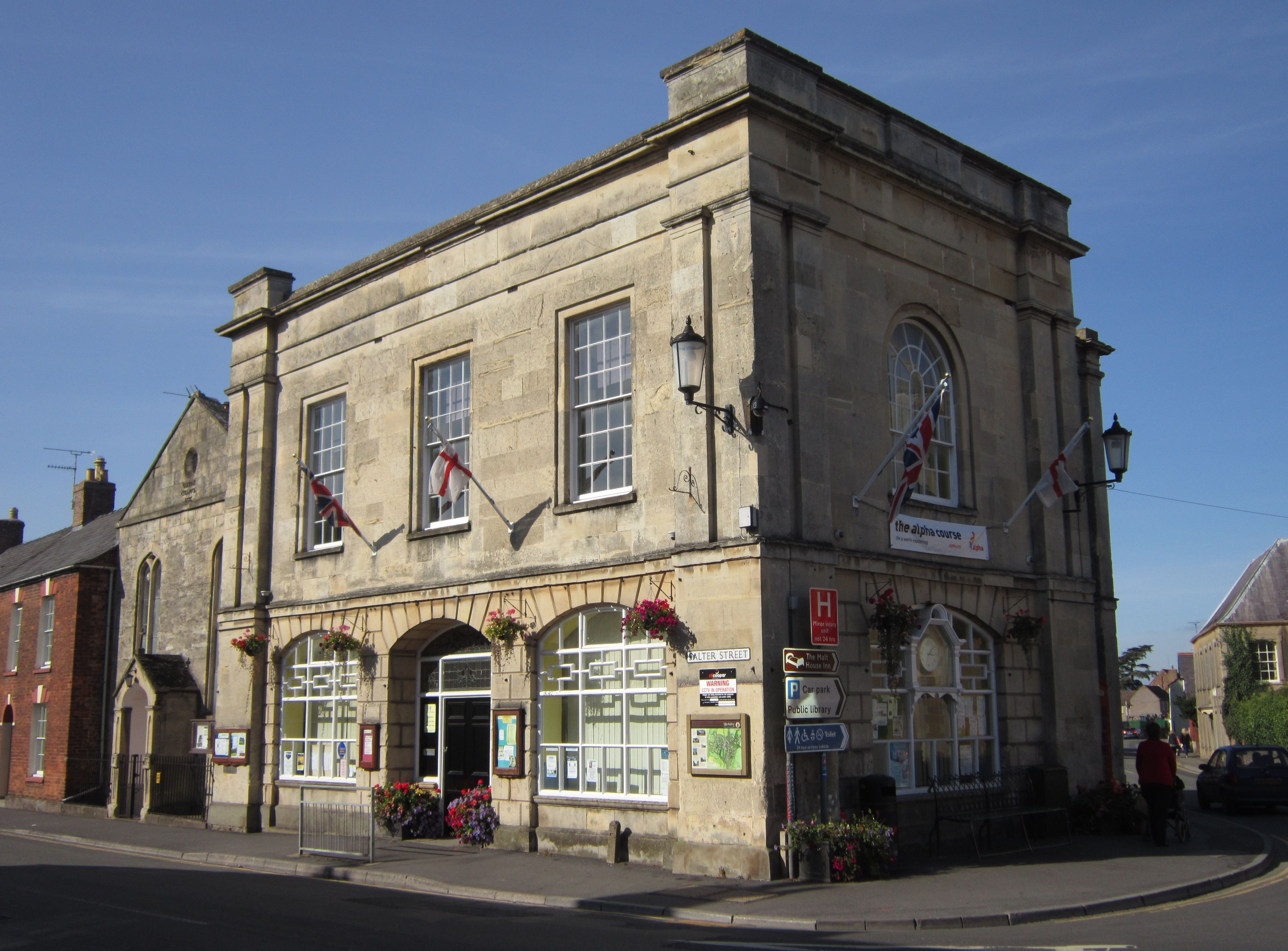
- Berkeley Town Hall

- Shown in Gloucestershire
- 51.6914°N 2.4589°W
- Location: Salter Street, Berkeley

History
- Built: 1824

Site notes
- Architectural style: Neoclassical style

Listed Building – Grade II
- Official name: Town Hall
- Designated: 21 October 1952
- Reference no.: 1222026

Berkeley Town Hall is a municipal building in Salter Street, Berkeley, Gloucestershire, England. The structure, which is now used as a community events venue, is a Grade II listed building.

== History ==
The first municipal building in Berkeley was an ancient market house on the south side of Salter Street. After it became dilapidated, the mayor and aldermen decided to finance and commission a new market house. The site they selected was on the opposite side of Salter Street. They borrowed £400 for the purpose, although ownership of the property was vested in the lord of the manor, Maurice Berkeley, 1st Baron FitzHardinge, whose seat was at Berkeley Castle.

The new building was designed in the neoclassical style, built in ashlar stone and was completed in 1824. The design involved a symmetrical main frontage of three bays facing onto Salter Street. The ground floor was rusticated and contained three segmental headed openings, which were fitted with gates and railings, while the first floor was fenestrated by sash windows with window sills. There were piers at the corners on the ground floor, which rose to paired pilasters on the first floor and supported a cornice and a parapet. Internally, the principal rooms were a market hall on the ground floor and an assembly room on the first floor.

By the mid-19th century, the markets had been abandoned and the ground floor was used for the storage of carts and other items. Meanwhile, the assembly room was used by the "British School and Young Men's Society". The borough council, which had met in the town hall, was abolished under the Municipal Corporations Act 1883. The openings on the ground floor were infilled and the market hall fitted out as a series of rooms at the expense of the then lord of the manor, Charles Berkeley, 3rd Baron FitzHardinge, in 1905.

Following local government reorganisation in 1974, Berkeley Town Council made the town hall its regular meeting place. It also continued to serve as a venue for public meetings and other community events. An extensive programme of repairs to the parapet and roof was completed in 1978.
