= Otho Thorpe =

Merchant and politician of The Colony of Virginia

Member of the House of Burgesses for York County
- In office April 1682
- Preceded by: John Page
- Succeeded by: Henry Jenkins

Personal details
- Born: baptized November 6, 1630 King's Cliffe, Northamptonshire, England
- Died: winter of 1696/7 London, England
- Resting place: All-Hallows-the-Wall parish, London
- Spouse(s): Elizabeth, Frances
- Relatives: George Thorpe

Otho Thorpe or Otto Thorp (b. 1630-d. winter of 1696/97) was an English merchant who became a militia officer and politician of Middle Plantation (the future Williamsburg) in the Colony of Virginia. His home was commandeered during Bacon's Rebellion, and in April 1682, Thorpe briefly represented York County in the House of Burgesses, before returning to England, where he died more than a decade later.

== Early and family life ==
Born to the wife of Thomas Thorpe, Otto was baptised on November 6, 1630 in the King's Cliffe village church. A kinsman, George Thorpe, had been a member of the King's bedchamber, and (briefly) a member of Parliament as well as of the Virginia Company of London and other entities before traveling to Berkeley Hundred in the Virginia colony and attempting to negotiate with the native Americans nearby. After that Thorpe's second journey in 1620 with William Tracy, he received 300 acres of land in Middle Plantation for serving as superintendent of the college lands at Henrico, but died with 9 other settlers at Berkeley Hundred during the Indian massacre of 1622. The exact kin relationship between the two men is unclear, as George Thorpe's heir was William Thorpe, but both men had kin named Thomas.

By 1660 Otto Thorpe had arrived at Middle Plantation and married Elizabeth, the widow of Richard Thorp. After she died, and before 1676, Thorpe remarried, to a woman named Frances, who survived him.

== Career ==
In January 1667/8, Thorpe purchased the former Clarke family land (850 acres in York County) in Middle Plantation from Edward Wyatt. However, by 1672, that purchase was the subject of litigation before the colony's General Court, and still pending four years later. Meanwhile in 1673 Thorpe had sued Thomas Warren, as commander of the ship Daniell to recover the value of goods damaged en route to London. In 1681, Thorpe purchased the former Fenn family land in Middle Plantation from Thomas Claiborne of Romancoke (and his wife Sarah Fenn), except for the two acres underlying Bruton Parish church and cemetery.

After the Long Assembly ended with Bacon's Rebellion and a new Virginia General Assembly had gathered at Jamestown, and Nathaniel Bacon had secured military commissions against Native Americans from Governor William Berkeley. Bacon and his followers returned to besiege Jamestown (with Frances Thorpe among other leading ladies and Indian allies placed atop the fortifications to deter a sally). After Governor Berkeley's forces withdrew, Bacon's followers burnt the colonial capital on September 19, 1676. On October 2, Bacon ordered many leading colonists to gather at this man's plantation nearby, and administered an oath which later was considered treasonous. By this time, Thorpe held the rank of captain in the county militia, and would rise to the rank of major in 1680. Thorpe also had been one of the justices of the peace for York County since 1674.

After the conflict, Thorpe requested compensation for the damage Bacon's men had caused his Middle Plantation property, which he specified as carrying off six servants as well as plundering goods worth 1200 pounds sterling, in addition to 400 pounds sterling worth of Thorpe's tobacco which Governor Berkeley's men seized after the conflict and placed aboard his ship for England. However, because Thorpe had signed a written oath Bacon proffered to leading men in August 1676, the commissioners hesitated to approve his claim, despite Thorpe's response that he was drunk when he signed the oath and consistently supported Virginia's government. In early 1678, his kinsman Thomas Thorp was named one of the three Virginia executors of the estate of Thomas Ludwell, who had been a prominent planter as well as the colony's secretary of state (with merchant John Jeffreys as his executor in England).

Although at some point burgess and major planter John Page sued Thorpe for a debt, York County voters elected Thorpe to succeed Page as one the burgesses representing them in the April 1682 assembly session.

== Death and legacy ==
Thorp moved to London and wrote a will identifying himself as a merchant on June 28, 1686. He died in London during the winter of 1696-97. His widow, Frances, remarried, to John Annesley of Westminster in Middlesex County, England. Thorpe left his Virginia property to his nephew Capt. Thomas Thorpe, his niece Hannah Thorpe (wife of London merchant John Pell) and his cousin John Grace, Meanwhile in 1699, the Virginia government moved the colony's capital to Middle Plantation, renamed "Williamsburg" to honor the monarch after the Glorious Revolution. On January 25, 1700 Hannah Thorpe Pell conveyed her interest in 450 acres in York County called Middle Plantation to Virginia merchant James Whaley. Annesley litigated against Whaley for illegally occupying this decedent's property.
