= Vraisemblance =

Principle developed in French Classical theater

Vraisemblance (French, "likelihood") is a principle developed in the theatrical literature of Classicism in France.

It demands that the actions and events in a play should be believable. The principle was sometimes used to criticize soliloquy (speaking to the audience), and in late classical plays characters are almost invariably supplied with confidants (valets, friends, nurses) to whom they reveal their emotions.

In literature, vraisemblance refers to ways 'in which a text may be brought into contact with and defined in relation to another text which helps make it intelligible' (Culler, pp. 140).

Jonathan Culler suggests five different levels of vraisemblance in literature:

1. A socially given text taken as the 'real world'
2. A general cultural text in which a shared knowledge is recognizable
3. Texts of genre conventions
4. Self-referential texts that cite and expose genre conventions
5. Intertextual texts where 'one work takes another as its basis or point of departure and must be assimilated in relation to it' (Culler, pp. 140)

== See also ==
- Theatre of France: 17th century Classicism
- French literature of the 17th century
