= Vale of Berkeley College =

The Vale of Berkeley College

Location
- Wanswell; Berkeley, Gloucestershire, GL13 9RS; England; 51°41′20″N 2°28′52″W

Information
- Type: Comprehensive School
- Established: 1971
- Closed: 2011
- Local authority: Gloucestershire
- Specialist: Technology College
- Department for Education URN: 115724 Tables
- Ofsted: Reports
- Headteacher: Nikky Ross
- Gender: Coeducational
- Age: 11 to 16
- Enrolment: 268

The Vale of Berkeley College was a small comprehensive school located in Wanswell, near Berkeley, Gloucestershire, England. The school closed in July 2011.

The site is now occupied by Focus School Berkeley Campus, part of the Focus Learning Trust associated with the Plymouth Brethren.
