= Little Avon River =

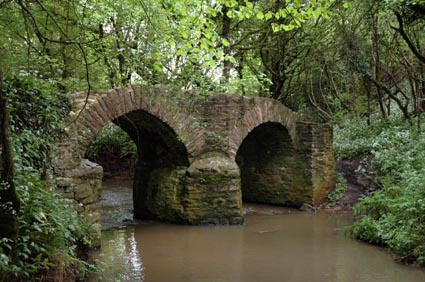
- Sturt Bridge near Wickwar, a packhorse bridge on the Little Avon River

- Location within Gloucestershire

Location
- Country: United Kingdom
- Parts: England
- Region: South West
- Administrative areas: Gloucestershire, South Gloucestershire

Physical characteristics
- Source
  - location: Horton, Gloucestershire, England
  - coordinates: 51°33′30″N 2°21′12″W
- Mouth: Berkeley Pill
  - location: Severn Estuary, United Kingdom
  - coordinates: 51°41′58″N 2°29′18″W

The Little Avon River is a small river partly in southern Gloucestershire and partly in South Gloucestershire. For much of its length it forms the boundary between the county of Gloucestershire and the unitary authority of South Gloucestershire. It rises to the east of Wickwar, near Horton, passes near Charfield, Stone and Berkeley, and enters the River Severn via Berkeley Pill. It was formerly navigable up to moorings at Berkeley, but a flood-prevention scheme, built in the 1960s, now prevents navigation more than a few hundred metres upstream.

== Geology ==
The Little Avon River rises from a point upstream to the east of Wickwar in Gloucestershire, flowing north-west for 15 kilometres (9.3 mi), near Charfield, Stone and Berkeley, before finally joining the River Severn. The river runs through sandstone and clay, while the source water has been affected by the limestone from where it rises. The river starts as a steep course, with a natural riffle-pool sequence, before flattening out at Stone, where the river has been modified for use for irrigation. By the time the river reaches Berkeley, it is sheltered from the tide using tidal gates.

Its tributaries include Ozleworth Brook, Dyers Brook through Wotton-under-Edge, Doverte Brook and Kilcott Brook.

== Ecology ==
Rare species of conservation interest including white-clawed crayfish, water voles, bullheads and eels are known to live in the catchment. Ten species from the UK Biodiversity Action Plan have been recorded, as well as several from the IUCN Red List.

The river is used as a fishery, controlled by Berkeley Estate Fishing Syndicate, which ensures that brown trout and grayling are in the river for fly fishing as well as standard coarse fishing species.

== Notable features ==
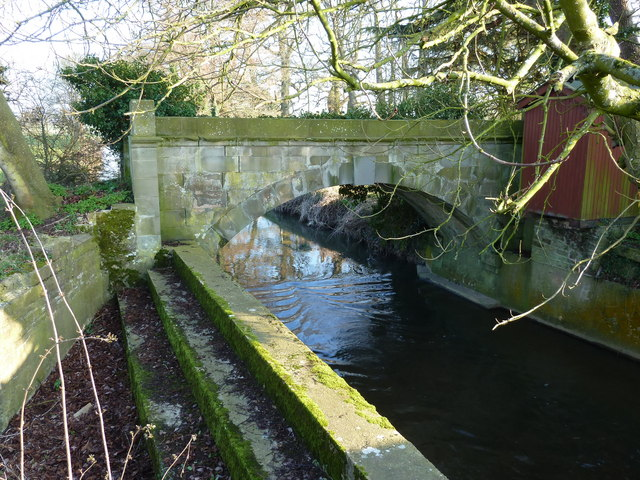
Grade II listed footbridge over the river

There is a footbridge over the Little Avon River which links Berkeley Castle to Berkeley Stables. It was built around the turn of the 19th century, with the main arch being about 8 metres (26 ft) wide and 3.5 metres (11 ft) above water level at its highest point. The pathway across the bridge is approximately 1.5 metres (4 ft 11 in) wide, with the total width of 2.5 metres (8 ft 2 in). The bridge was designated Grade II listed status on 9 September 1985.
