= Alkington, Gloucestershire =

Alkington
- Civil parish
- Interactive map of Alkington
- Coordinates: 51.67°N 2.43°W
- Country: England
- Primary council: Stroud
- County: Gloucestershire
- Region: South West England
- Status: Parish
- Main settlements: Newport, Woodford

Government
  - Type: Parish Council
  - UK Parliament: Stroud

Population (2011)
  - Total: 688
- Postcode: GL13 9

Alkington is a civil parish in the district of Stroud, Gloucestershire.

== Geography ==
It had a population of 638 in the 2001 census, increasing to 688 at the 2011 census. There is no Alkington village, the parish consists of various hamlets, including Woodford, Newport and Lower Wick.

The parish adjoins the Stroud parishes of Ham and Stone to the west; Hamfallow to the north; Stinchcombe to the north-east; North Nibley to the east. The South Gloucestershire parishes of Charfield and Tortworth lie to the south and south-west respectively.

Alkington was in Thornbury Rural District until the RDC was abolished in 1974. The greater part was transferred into the new county of Avon, as part of the new district of Northavon but a group of parishes in the north of the district, around Berkeley, wished not to transfer into the new county, but chose instead to remain with Gloucestershire, under the new Stroud District Council. These were the parishes of Hinton, Hamfallow, Ham and Stone, Alkington, and Berkeley itself.

With the demise of Avon, in 1996, Alkington remained with the main county of Gloucestershire.

=== Economy ===
The M5 Michaelwood services are situated in the village.
