= Ham and Stone =

Civil parish in Gloucestershire, England

Coordinates: 51.6736°N 2.4917°W

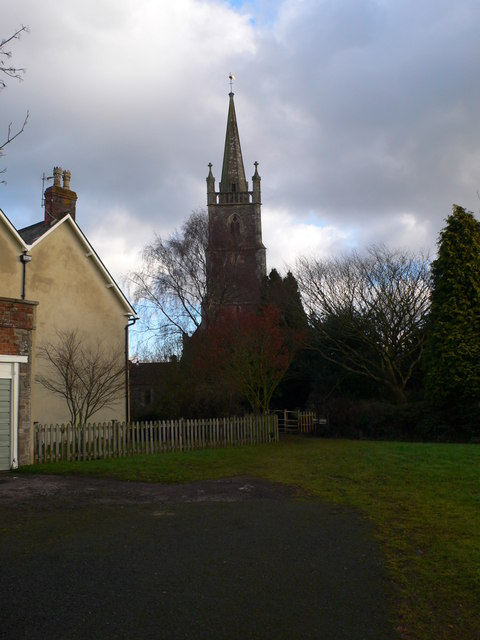
- All Saints Church

- Location within Gloucestershire
- Population: 776 (2019)
- Civil parish: Ham and Stone
- District: Stroud
- Shire county: Gloucestershire
- Region: South West
- Country: England
- Sovereign state: United Kingdom
- Post town: Berkeley
- Postcode district: GL13
- Police: Gloucestershire
- Fire: Gloucestershire
- Ambulance: South Western

Ham and Stone is a civil parish in the Stroud district, in the county of Gloucestershire, England. It includes the settlements of Bevington, Ham, Hystfield and Stone. As of 2019, it has a population of 776.

== History ==
Ham and Stone was a chapelry and tything, it became a civil parish in 1866.
