= Stone, Gloucestershire =

Village in Gloucestershire, England

Coordinates: 51.656°N 2.458°W

Stone
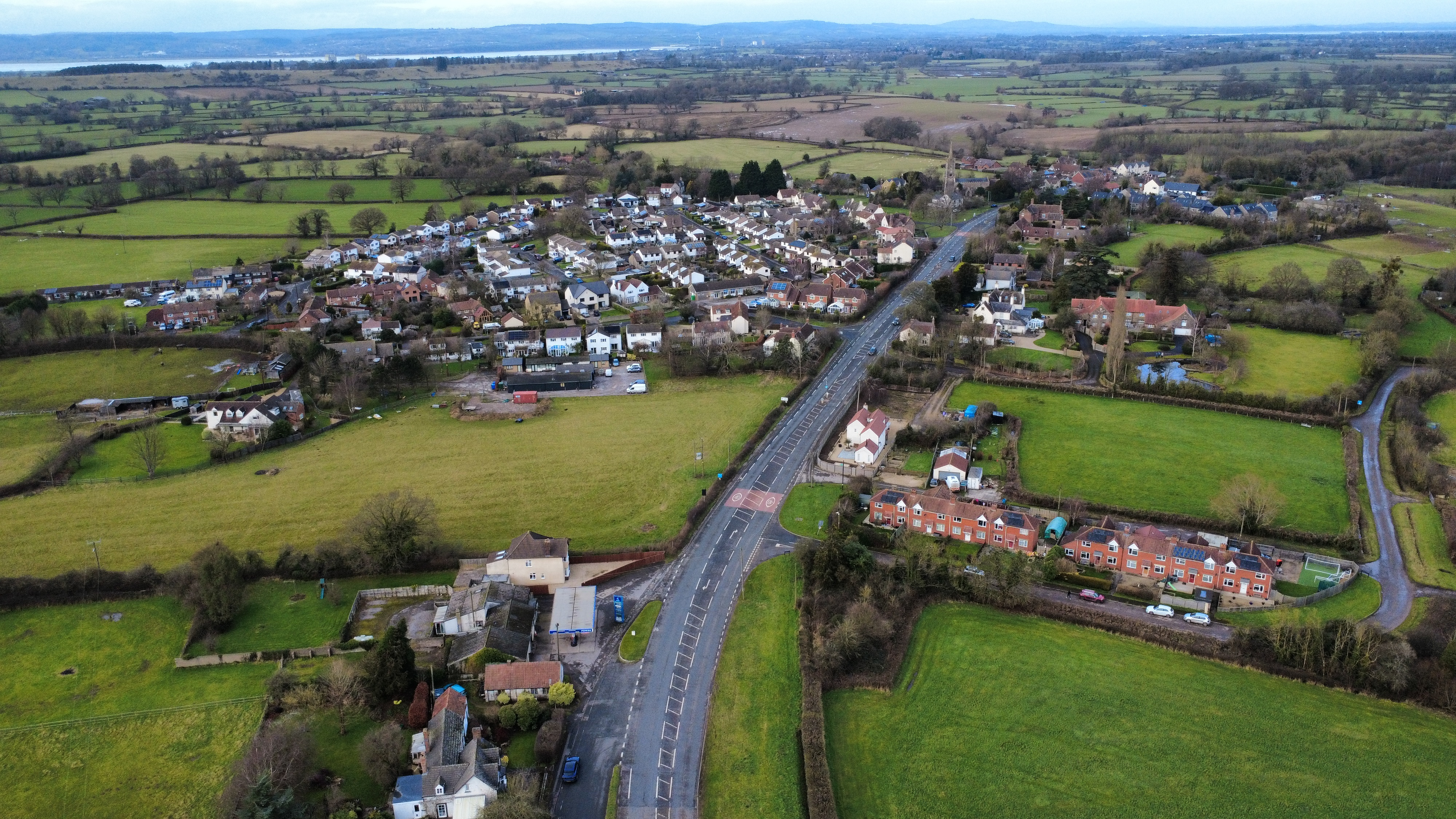
- Stone, from 100 metres, looking north.

- Location within Gloucestershire
- Area: 0.2850 km^{2} (0.1100 sq mi)
- Population: 527 (2019 esitimate)
  - Density: 1,849/km^{2} (4,790/sq mi)
- OS grid reference: ST684953
- Civil parish: Ham and Stone
- District: Stroud
- Shire county: Gloucestershire
- Region: South West
- Country: England
- Sovereign state: United Kingdom
- Post town: Berkeley
- Postcode district: GL13
- Police: Gloucestershire
- Fire: Gloucestershire
- Ambulance: South Western
- UK Parliament: Stroud

Stone is a village in the parish of Ham and Stone, Gloucestershire, England. It stands on the A38 road, just south-west of its crossing of the Little Avon River, halfway between Bristol and Gloucester, adjacent to the county boundary with South Gloucestershire. Woodford, immediately northeast in the Alkington parish, is part of the shared community.

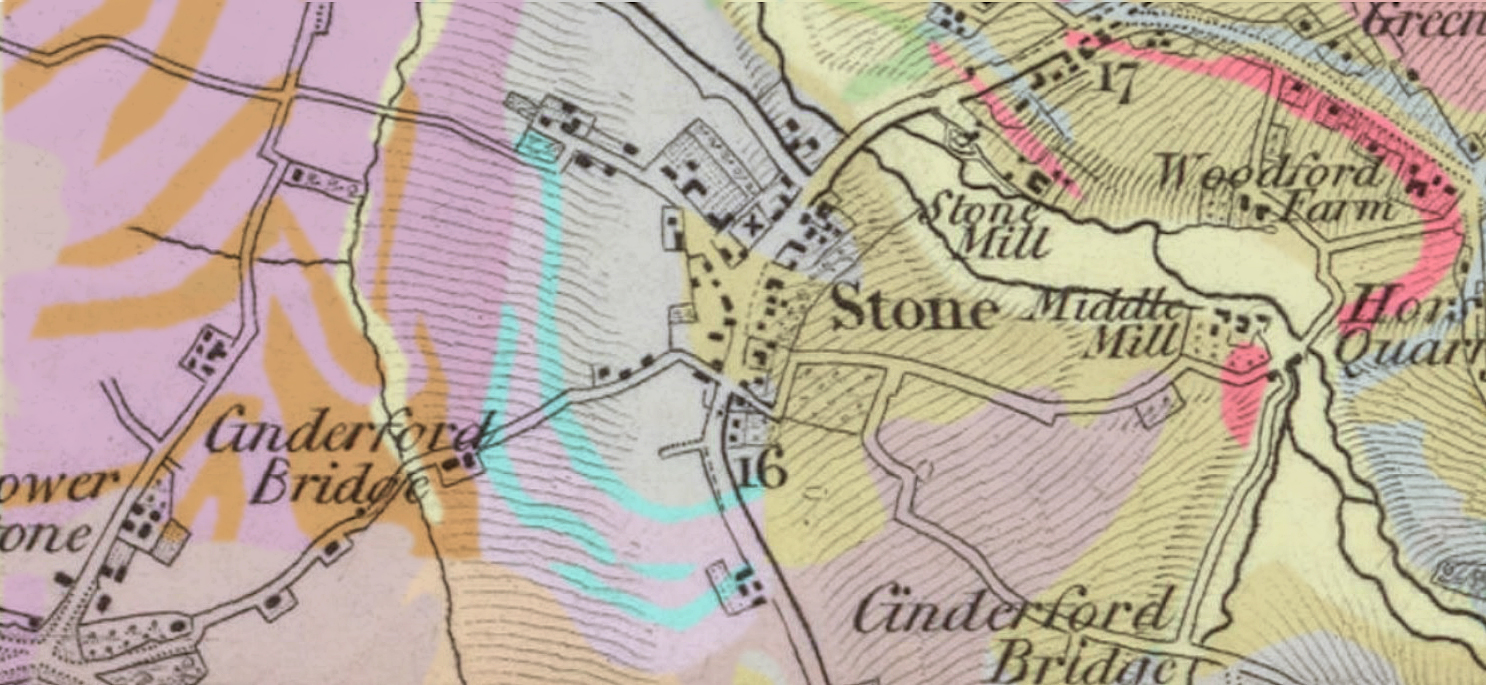
OS map from 1830 with mostly Silurian bedrock overlaid. Grey central areas are mudstone; ochre areas are mustone/sandstone; cyan areas are limestone; pink areas at left are basalt; other areas are types of mudstone except for yellow alluvium.

== Geography ==
Stone lies mostly to the west of the Little Avon River and to the east of one of its tributaries; Woodford lies to the east of the river. The bedrock under most dwellings in Stone is mudstone of the Tortworth beds, sedimentary rock formed between 438.5 and 433.4 million years ago in the Silurian period. In the majority of other places, the mudstone is interbedded with sandstone, from the same Tortworth beds and period. Woodford lies mostly on the mudstone/sandstone interbedding with but with two long, thin areas of igneous rock running roughly northwest to southeast, specifically "Upper Trap" basalt from the same time in the Silurian (see illustration). To the southwest and west there are thin arcs of limestone and calcareous mudstone. Along the river, the superficial deposit is sedimentary alluvium of clay, silt, sand and gravel formed between 11.8 thousand years ago and the present in the Quaternary period. Elevations are between 11 metres by the river to 30 metres just east of the A38 road.

== History ==
Stone has long existed as a village linked to Berkeley, 2 1/2 miles (4 km) to the north; historically it was part of the parish of Berkeley, in the rural deanery of Dursley and the archdeaconry of Gloucester. The areas with housing in this rural area broadly match those of the early 19th century; the population at the 2021 Census was slightly smaller to that at the end of the 19th century. In 1897, in the old tithing area of Ham and Stone, there were 830 residents recorded; Alkington had 818. In 2021, the figures were was 801 and 742 respectively.

There are 30 scheduled monuments in and around Stone from Lower Stone in the east to Damery Lane in the west, including All Saints' Church, founded in the 13th century, the old Stone Mill dating from the late 18th century, and Middle Mill and Hall Farmhouses from the early 17th century; these appear on Ordnance Survey maps from the early 1800s onwards.

== Modern villages ==
The villages of Stone and Woodford have All Saints' Church, a village green, Stone with Woodford Church of England Primary School and a village hall. The Berkeley Vale Hotel - formerly the Berkeley Vale Inn in the 19th century - closed in 2002 and was later redeveloped as housing after falling into ruin.

== Local Government and Parliament ==
Stone and Woodford are in the very south of the Berkeley Vale Ward of the Stroud District. Stone is in the civil parish of Ham and Stone, Woodford is in Alkington.

The villages are represented by the MP for Stroud (since the 2024 general election), Dr. Simon Opher.
