= Witch of Berkeley =

Medieval English Legend

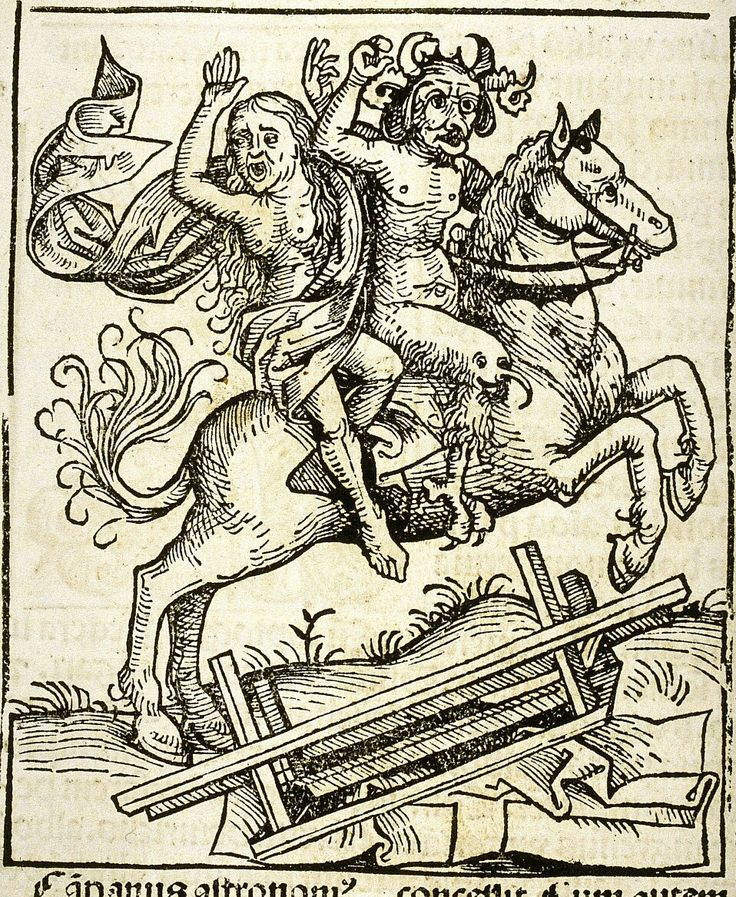
Illustration from the Nuremberg Chronicle of the Berkeley Witch being carried off by the Devil on horseback.

The Witch of Berkeley is a medieval English legend written by monk William of Malmesbury that acts as an allegory of the fate of sinners. The story begins with a woman who is addicted to witchcraft and skilled in ancient augury. The woman used her expertise in dark magic to become very rich and lascivious in appearance but was declining in health and nearing death. The woman is alerted when a jackdaw chirping louder than usual, gave a bad omen revolving around bad news. Shortly after, a messenger arrived and informed the woman that her son and his entire family had died in an accident. Knowing her time was near, the woman raced home and ordered her two remaining children come at once. She admitted that she used demonic arts and was the subject to all vices and allurements. The woman informed her children that evil spirits were coming for her body due to her sinful ways, and that in order for her body to not be taken the children must protect it above ground for three nights, then it can be buried safely on the fourth day. The woman wanted her children to do multiple acts to protect her body, such as sewing the woman’s corpse in the skin of a stag and to bind the coffin with three massive chains. The children completed the woman’s request and put her in the church, but it was in vain. For two nights straight, devils busted through the church doors and broke two of the chains on the woman’s coffin. On the third night, a devil who was “horrendous in appearance,” broke the last chain and dragged the woman from the coffin out of the church. The devil took her on his horse, vanishing from sight, with only the woman’s pitiable cries left behind.

== Purpose of the Witch of Berkeley ==
The Witch of Berkeley’s purpose in the Gesta Regum Anglorum is to serve as a tale concerning the fate of those who do not follow God and sin. The story is purposefully a direct opposite of William of Malmesbury’s retelling of the life and death of Pope Gregory VI. William uses Gregory’s story to show the death of a good man, whose body is thrust into a church with bolted by wind via God’s will. William intentionally then follows Gregory’s story with the Witch of Berkeley, both of them having themes that rival each other. Meanwhile, William presents the demise of a sinner who is lured into temptation in the Witch of Berkeley. William picks words and phrases carefully when writing the story of the woman to make it obvious that the story revolves around the idea of sin and not worshiping God. To start, the woman is addicted to witchcraft, and William uses it to explain how the woman uses the magic for evil. He uses the terminology “excessively gluttonous, perfectly lascivious, setting no bounds to her debaucheries.” William uses these descriptors to paint an image of a woman who has sinned her entire life and to the furthest extent. Additionally, William has the woman explain how she was drawn to allurements and every vice, and William the am writes that woman admits to being lured to sin that she will be punished for. William is stressing the idea that the woman sinned and made multiple direct references to inform readers that the woman sinned. The woman was lured to sin in a multitude of ways, but William does not specify how she sinned exactly. Lastly, William writes about her body being expelled from the church by devils. In Gregory’s story he was thrust into the bolted Church by God’s will. In the Witch of Berkeley, the woman is forcefully removed. By putting the Witch of Berkeley after Gregory’s, William is showing the difference of what happens if a person leaves their life to God or if a person is lured into sin by devils. If one is to follow God, their corpse will be welcomed in his home, the church. But if one abstains from following the Father, they will perish with the very devils that lured them into sinning. This is the purpose of the Witch of Berkeley, to explain to those who sin and do not follow God what their fate would be.

== Writing influences in the Witch of Berkeley ==
Outside of its meaning, the Witch of Berkeley story was told to William by a man who reportedly saw the events transpire, but outside influences can be seen within the story, which affected the way William wrote. For instance, classical influences can be seen in the type of magic performed by the woman, augury. William takes inspiration from Roman religious culture that associate augury with the will of the gods through the flight of birds, and this idea was prominent. Augury is what begins the story, with the woman receiving an omen from the bird. Further, William wrote the woman’s fate by taking inspiration from Pope Gregory I’s Dialogues. In Dialogues there is a story about a Milanese churchman who was also a sinner that suffered a similar, dragging out of the church-like fate. The woman and the churchman both howl as they are being carried away by devils as well. Lastly, another idea that William possibly borrowed from was De miraculis sancti Edmundi, a text by Herman the Archdeacon. In the text there is a story about a sheriff that involves the body of the sheriff being sewn into animal skin and thrown into a lake due to the corpse being possessed by a demon. In the Witch of Berkeley, the woman is sewed in a deer skin to avoid being taken away. Either William was inspired by Herman, or both historians used similar sources. Additionally, this method of sewing corpses into animal skins, deer and calf specifically, was used to “prevent” demonic molestation amongst other uses.

== Gesta Regum Anglorum ==
The tale of the Witch of Berkeley, written by William of Malmesbury, is within the historical work Gesta Regum Anglorum. Commissioned by Queen Matilda of England around 1118, Gesta Regum was written in Latin with the first edition being finished by 1125 or 1126, and the text would offer critical historical insight into the history of England after English historian Bede's death, the estimated years of the information in the Gesta Regum being dated around the 730s to early 12th century. Additionally, William declared his purpose of the Gesta Regum was to present a concise history of England tracing back to their origins, while specifically focusing on the years after Bede. Although William was commissioned by Matilda, he writes not just for her but for the broader scholarship. That is, William writes texts like Gesta Regum to collect and copy the works of others when writing to preserve knowledge of history as a whole. For instance, when writing the Gesta Regum, William used every source available to him at the time, building up and preserving history through Gesta Regum and the sources he collected.

== In popular culture ==
In Mike Mignola's comic book Hellboy, the titular character is born from a dead witch who is dragged from her coffin into Hell by a demon. This episode follows the Berkeley legend almost verbatim, right down to the hook-covered horse, but shifts the setting to the fictional village of East Bromwich.
