= Berkeley, Gloucestershire =

Town in Gloucestershire, England

Coordinates: 51.691°N 2.459°W

Berkeley
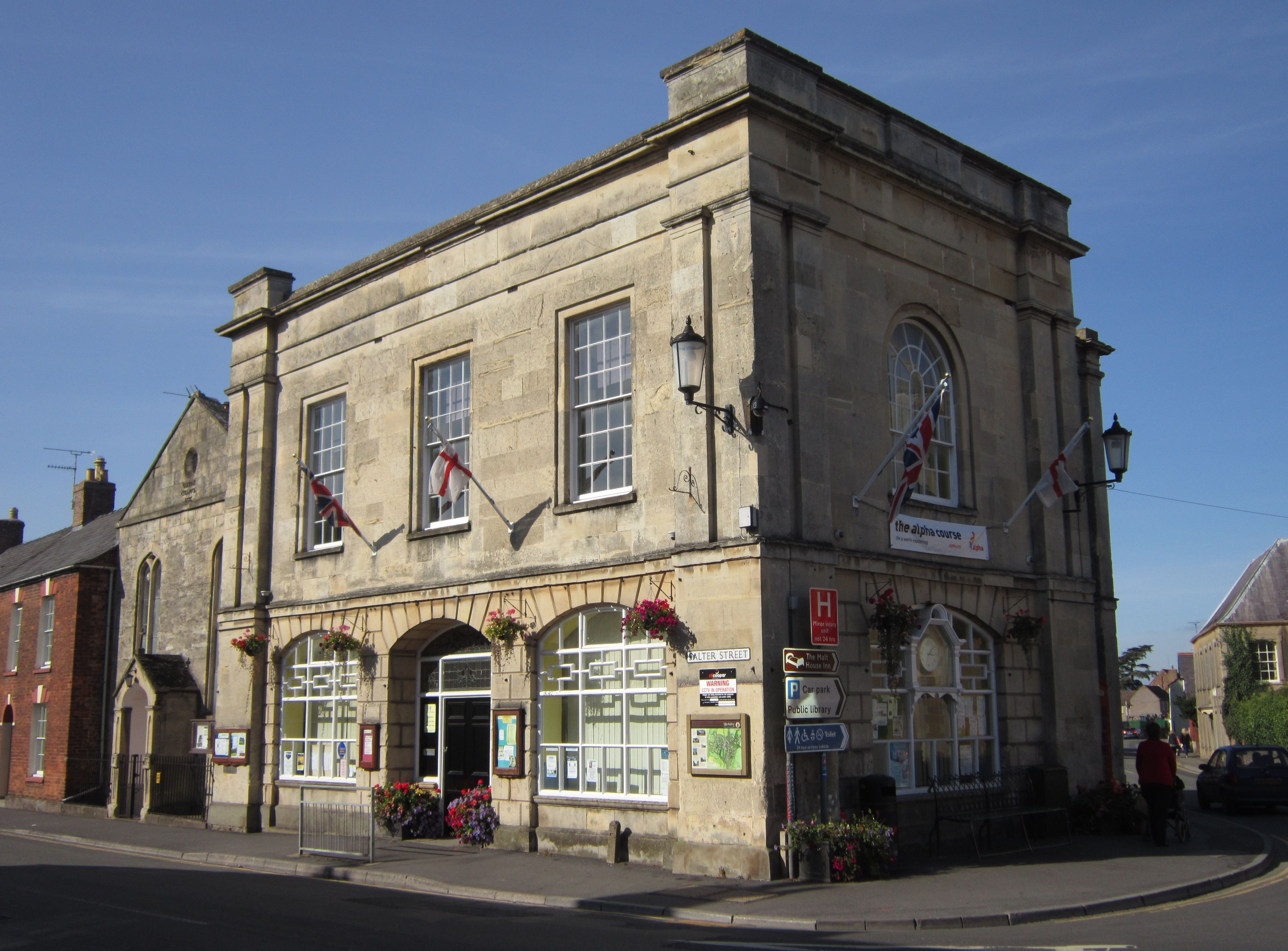
- Berkeley Town Hall

- Location within Gloucestershire
- Population: 2,252 (2021 Census)
- OS grid reference: ST684992
  - London: 120 mi (190 km) E
- Civil parish: Berkeley
- District: Stroud
- Shire county: Gloucestershire
- Region: South West
- Country: England
- Sovereign state: United Kingdom
- Post town: BERKELEY
- Postcode district: GL13
- Dialling code: 01453
- Police: Gloucestershire
- Fire: Gloucestershire
- Ambulance: South Western
- UK Parliament: Stroud

Berkeley (/ˈbɑːrkli/ BARK-lee) is a market town and civil parish in the Stroud District in Gloucestershire, England. It lies in the Vale of Berkeley between the east bank of the River Severn and the M5 motorway. The town is noted for Berkeley Castle, where the imprisoned King Edward II is believed to have been murdered, as well as the birthplace of the physician Edward Jenner, pioneer of the smallpox vaccine, the world's first vaccine.

== Geography ==
Berkeley lies midway between Bristol and Gloucester, on a small hill in the Vale of Berkeley. The town is on the Little Avon River, which flows into the Severn at Berkeley Pill. The Little Avon was tidal, and so navigable, for some distance inland (as far as Berkeley itself and the Sea Mills at Ham) until a 'tidal reservoir' was implemented at Berkeley Pill in the late 1960s.

== Governance ==
An electoral ward in the same name exists. This ward stretches from Berkeley in the south to Hinton in the north. The total ward population taken at the 2011 census was 4,181.

== History ==
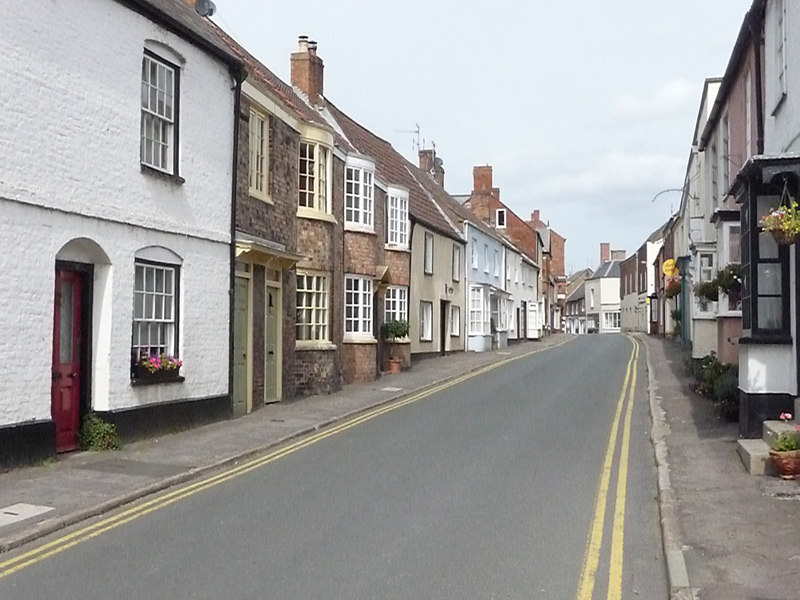
Berkeley High Street

Berkeley was first recorded in 824 as Berclea, from the Old English for "birch lea".

Berkeley was a significant place in medieval times. It was a port and market-town, and the meeting place of the hundred of Berkeley. Recent archeological evacuations on the grounds of Berkeley Castle have uncovered remains of a significant Anglo-Saxon minster which was attached to a monastery of nuns. Evidence has been found of their having a significant scriptorium. The monastery appears to have been demolished in 1044.

After the Norman Conquest, a Flemish noble named Roger de Tosny was appointed Provost of the manor of Berkeley by his brother-in-law (or perhaps uncle) Earl William FitzOsbern. His family took the name "de Berkeley", and it was he who began the construction of Berkeley Castle, which was completed by his son, also Roger. A younger son of the elder Roger, John de Berkeley, went north to Scotland with Queen Maud, becoming the progenitor of the Scottish Barclay family.

The parish of Berkeley was the largest in Gloucestershire. It included the tithings of Alkington, Breadstone, Ham, Hamfellow and Hinton, and the chapelry of Stone, which became a separate parish in 1797. Hinton became a separate civil parish, and the separate ecclesiastical parish of Sharpness with Purton, in the 20th century. Berkeley Town Hall dates from 1824.

Berkeley was the site of Berkeley nuclear power station, which had two Magnox nuclear reactors. This power station, the first commercial British reactor to enter operation, has since been decommissioned and all that remains are the two reactors encased in concrete. The administrative centre adjacent to the station is still active however – the centre was founded as Berkeley Nuclear Laboratories in the early 1960s and was one of the three principal research laboratories of the Central Electricity Generating Board. Since its decommission, SGS Berkeley Green UTC has opened nearby and serves as a technical college.

A local legend tells that the town was once home to the Witch of Berkeley, who sold her soul to the Devil in exchange for wealth. It is said that, despite taking refuge in the church, the Devil carried her off on a black horse covered with spikes.

== Transport ==
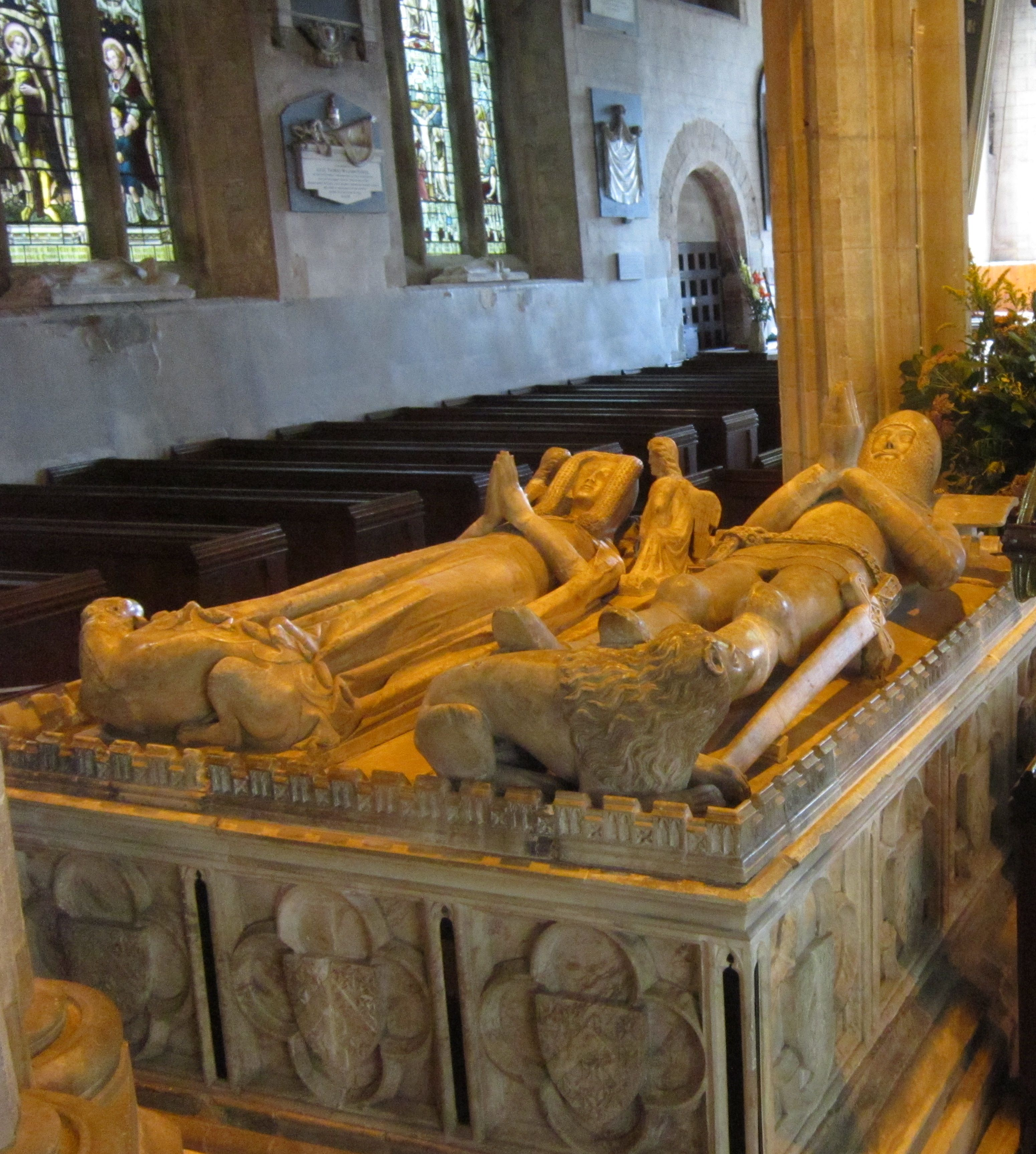
14th century effigies of Thomas Lord Berkeley and his wife Katherine, in St Mary's parish church

The Gloucester and Sharpness Canal (originally known as the Gloucester and Berkeley canal) starts near here.

There are several bus services running to and from the town.

From 1876 to 1964 the town had a railway station, originally on a branch from a junction at Berkeley Road on the Bristol and Gloucester Railway. From 1879 the branch became a through-route to Lydney when the Severn Railway Bridge was opened. In 1960 the bridge was damaged beyond repair by a ship collision. Some of the rail line is still used by the Power Station to transport low level nuclear waste by rail, and a railway preservation society is working to extend the line to Sharpness. Nearest station is now Cam and Dursley (5 miles).

== Education ==
Berkeley has a small primary school. The Vale of Berkeley College, the town's secondary school, closed in 2011. Since 2017 SGS Berkeley Green UTC has operated on the nearby site of Berkeley nuclear power station with a specialisation in engineering and cyber security.

== Notable people ==
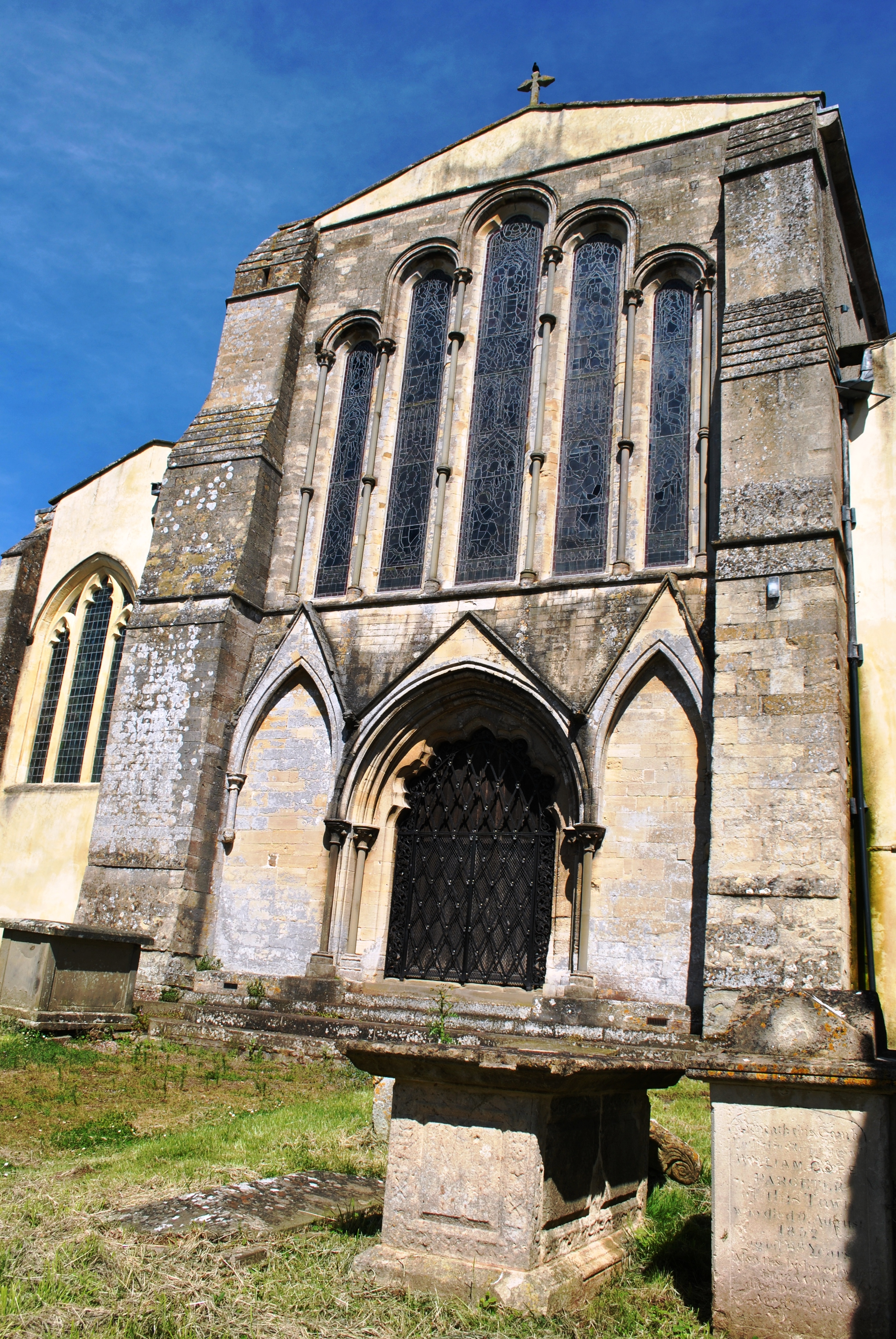
St Mary's Church and churchyard

Edward Jenner, the originator of vaccination, was born in Berkeley. After studying medicine in London he returned home to work as the local doctor, and in 1796, realising that milkmaids did not catch smallpox, he performed a pioneering experiment by inoculating his gardener's son James Phipps with cowpox, thus preventing infection from smallpox. Jenner is buried in the family vault at the Church of St Mary, Berkeley; Phipps is also buried there. The Chantry, Jenner's home in Berkeley for 38 years, is now the Edward Jenner Museum. Jenner inoculated local people, free of charge, in a one-room hut in the garden, which he called the "Temple of Vaccinia". The hut is considered to be "the birth-place of public health".

Victoria Cross recipient John Fitzhardinge Paul Butler was born here.

== See also ==
- Berkeley Hunt
- Berkeley Square
