= William Franks (landowner) =

English landowner

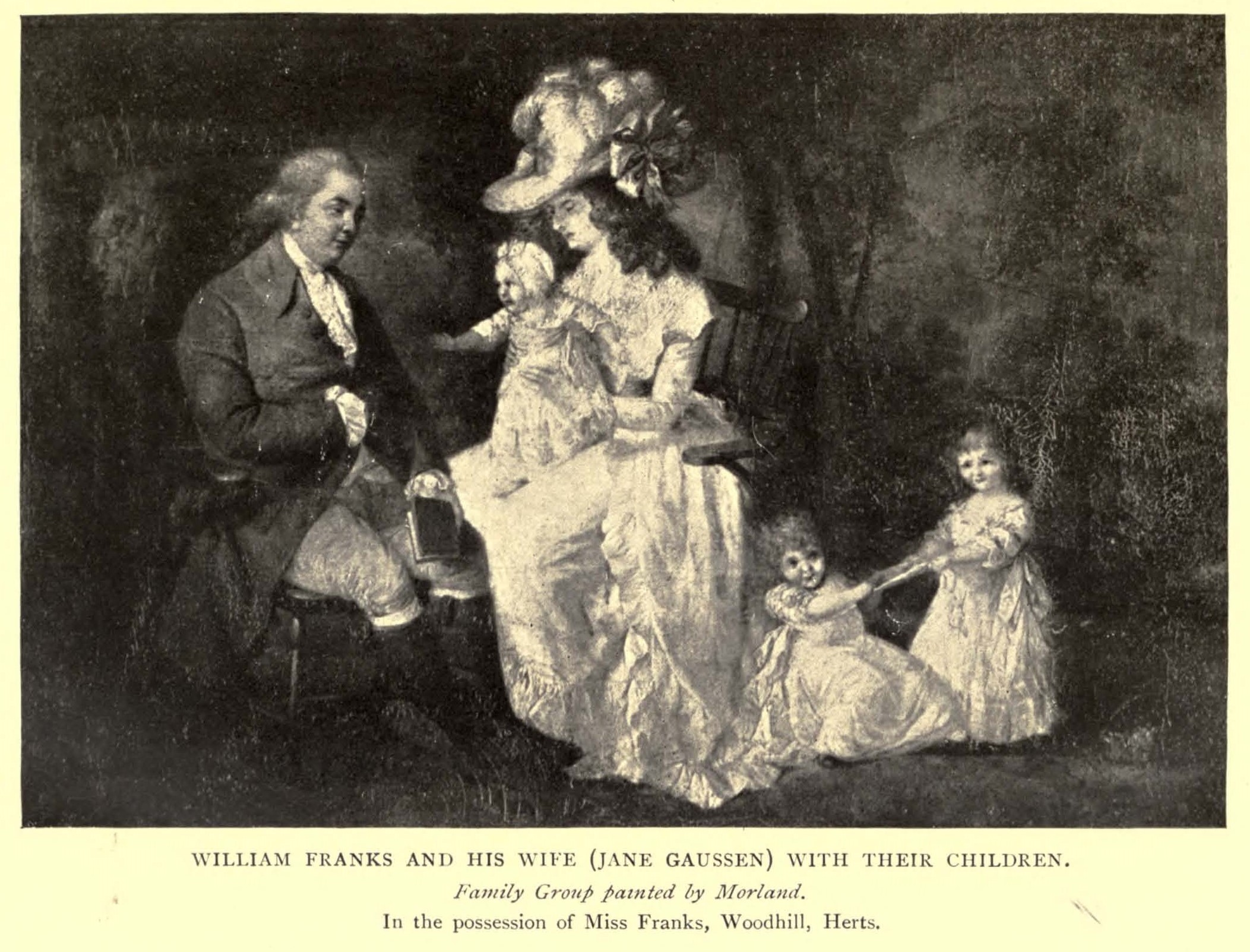
William Franks and his wife (Jane Gaussen) with their children. George Morland, n.d. (Morland lodged in Charlotte Street in 1796)

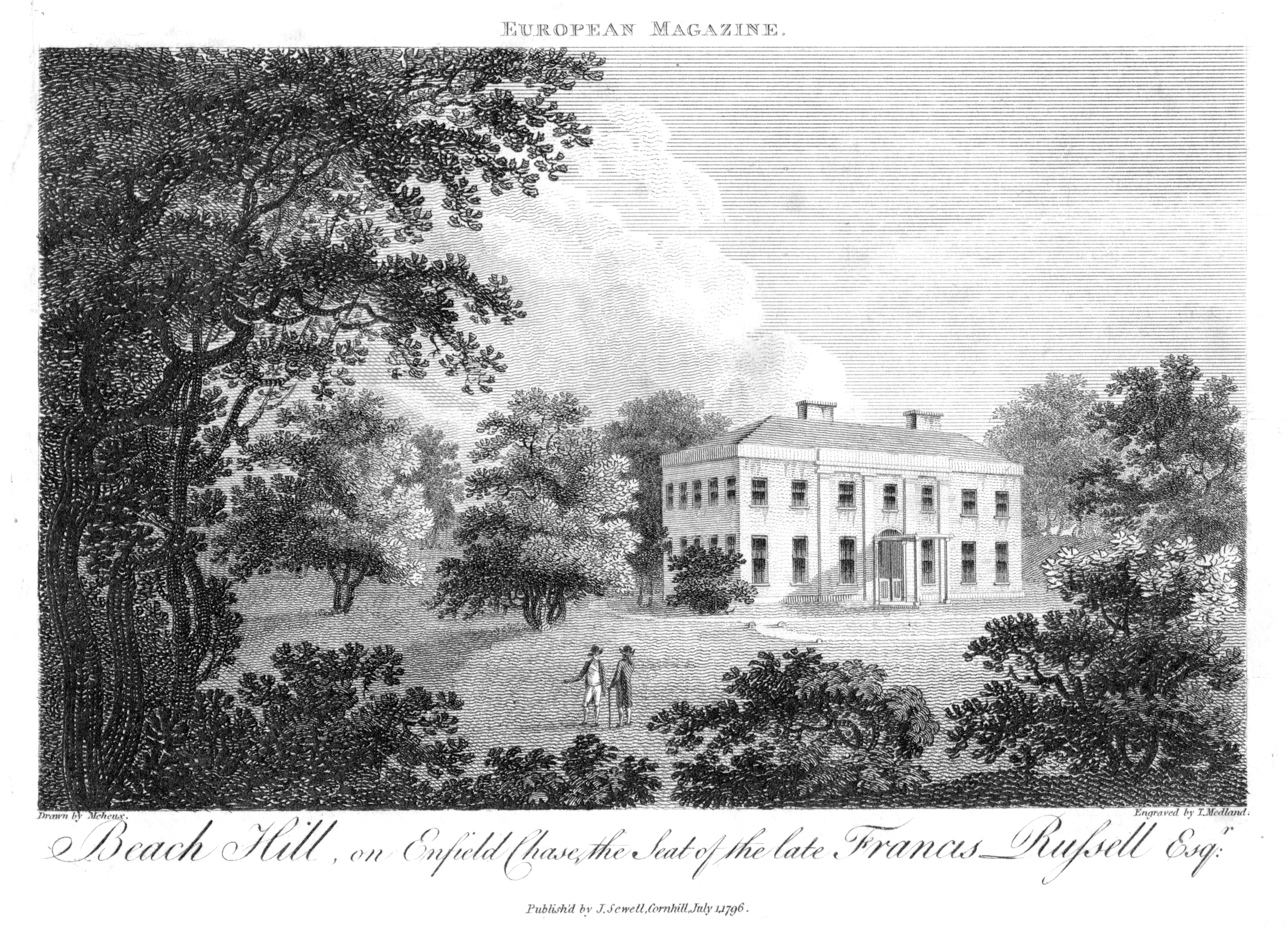
Beech Hill Park, as illustrated in European Magazine, 1 July 1796.

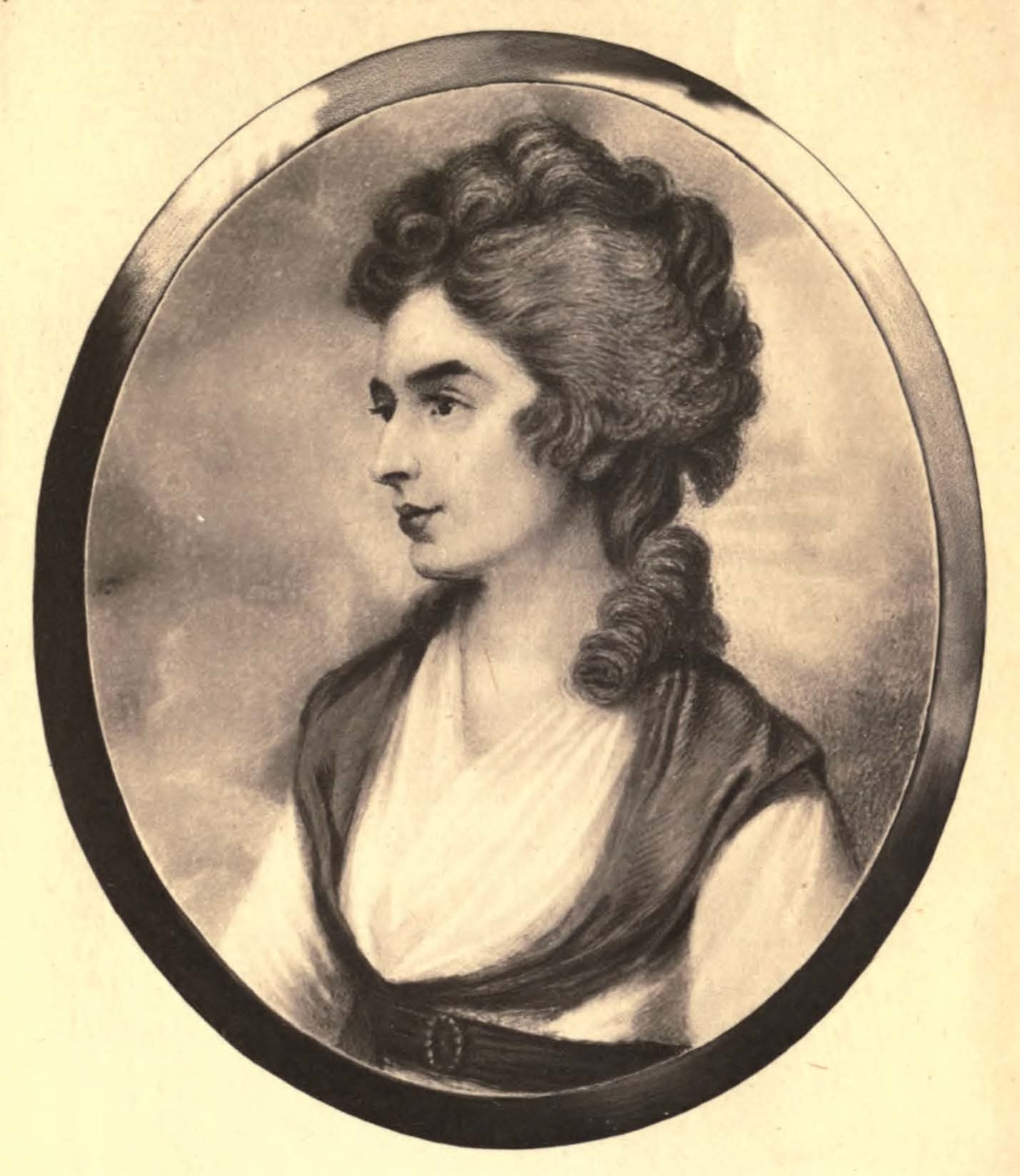
Jane Gaussen in a miniature. Anonymous, n.d.

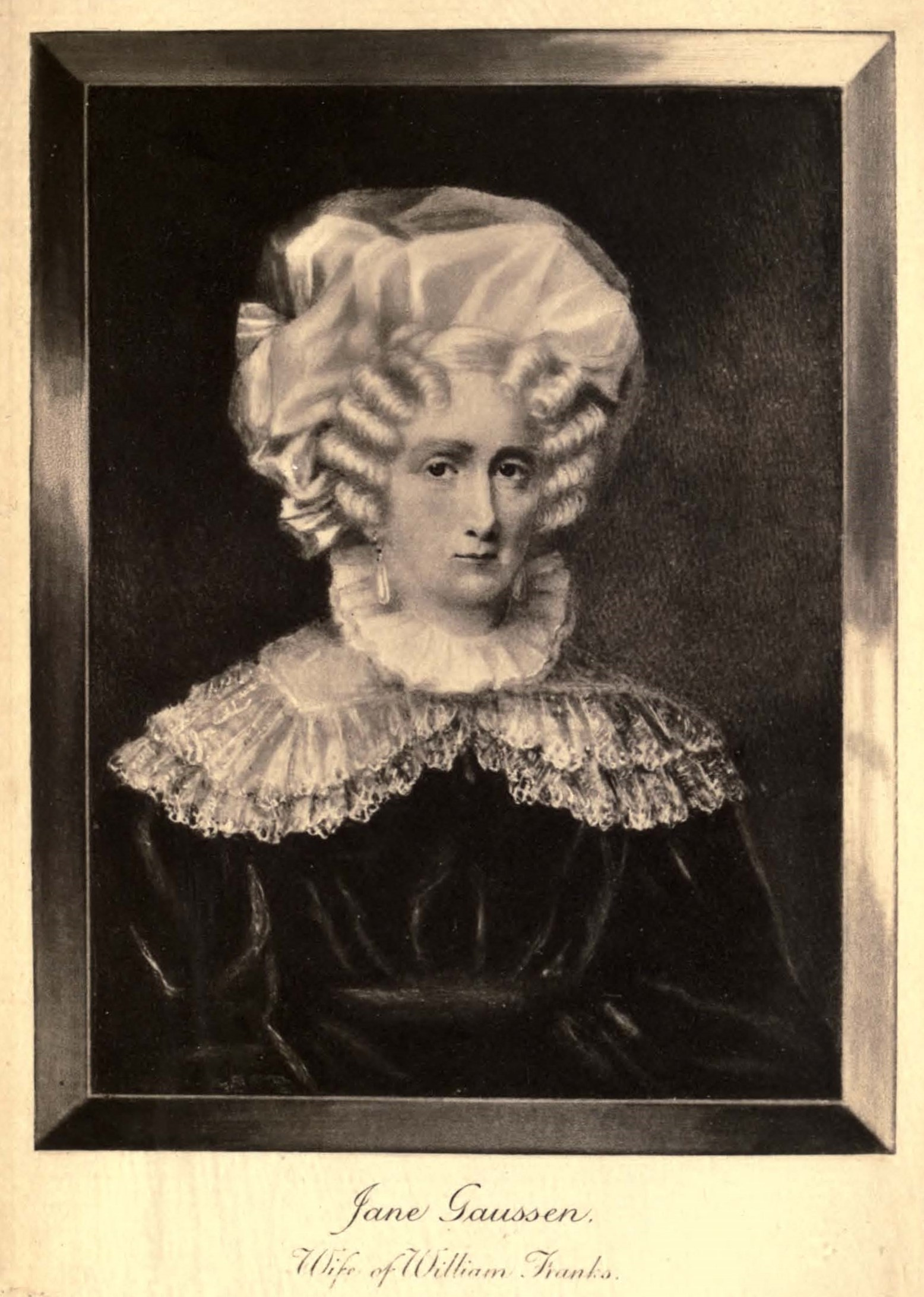
A miniature of Jane Gaussen. Anonymous, n.d.

William Franks (died July 1797) was a landowner in East Barnet, Hadley Wood and Cheshunt, and the owner of a large estate in the former Enfield Chace.

== Early life ==
Franks was the son of William Franks (died 1790) who was important in the development of what is now known as Fitzrovia in central London and was responsible for the construction of large parts of Percy Street, Rathbone Street and Charlotte Street. William's mother was Mary Franks née Pepys (died 1805).

== Houses ==
In 1786, Franks bought Mount Pleasant (later known as Belmont) from Sir William Henry Ashhurst. In 1790, he bought Beech Hill Park, the former home of Francis Russell, and sold Mount Pleasant to William Wroughton.

== Family ==
In 1780, Franks married Jane Gaussen in Leyton, Essex. Their children included:

- Marianne who married John Richard Thackeray, the rector of nearby Monken Hadley, in 1810. Marianne died 23 March 1855. Marianne and John had a son and two daughters, all baptised at Downham Market.
- Cecilia (baptised 1789) who married firstly (1813) Samuel Robert Gaussen and later (1831) George Jacob Bosanquet, son of Jacob Bosanquet.
- Charles Franks (1791 – 1870) a banker of Cumberland Street, Hyde Park, and Buckskin Hall, Cockfosters.

== Death ==
Franks died at Bristol Wells in July 1797. He is buried at St John the Baptist church, Kentish Town, and a memorial to him and his wife exists in the church. After his death, his freehold and leasehold property was auctioned in 1798. Advertising for the sale described the properties as being in "Enfield Chace, East Barnet, on Barnet Common, and on Cheshunt Common". Beech Hill Park was described as a "capital residence" and an "elegant spacious modern-built mansion". It was conveyed to Archibald Paris on 12 April 1800 but a Mrs Franks remained in residence until at least 1802 and Paris did not move in until 1805.
