= Folly Farm, Barnet =

Coordinates: 51.6568°N 0.1696°W

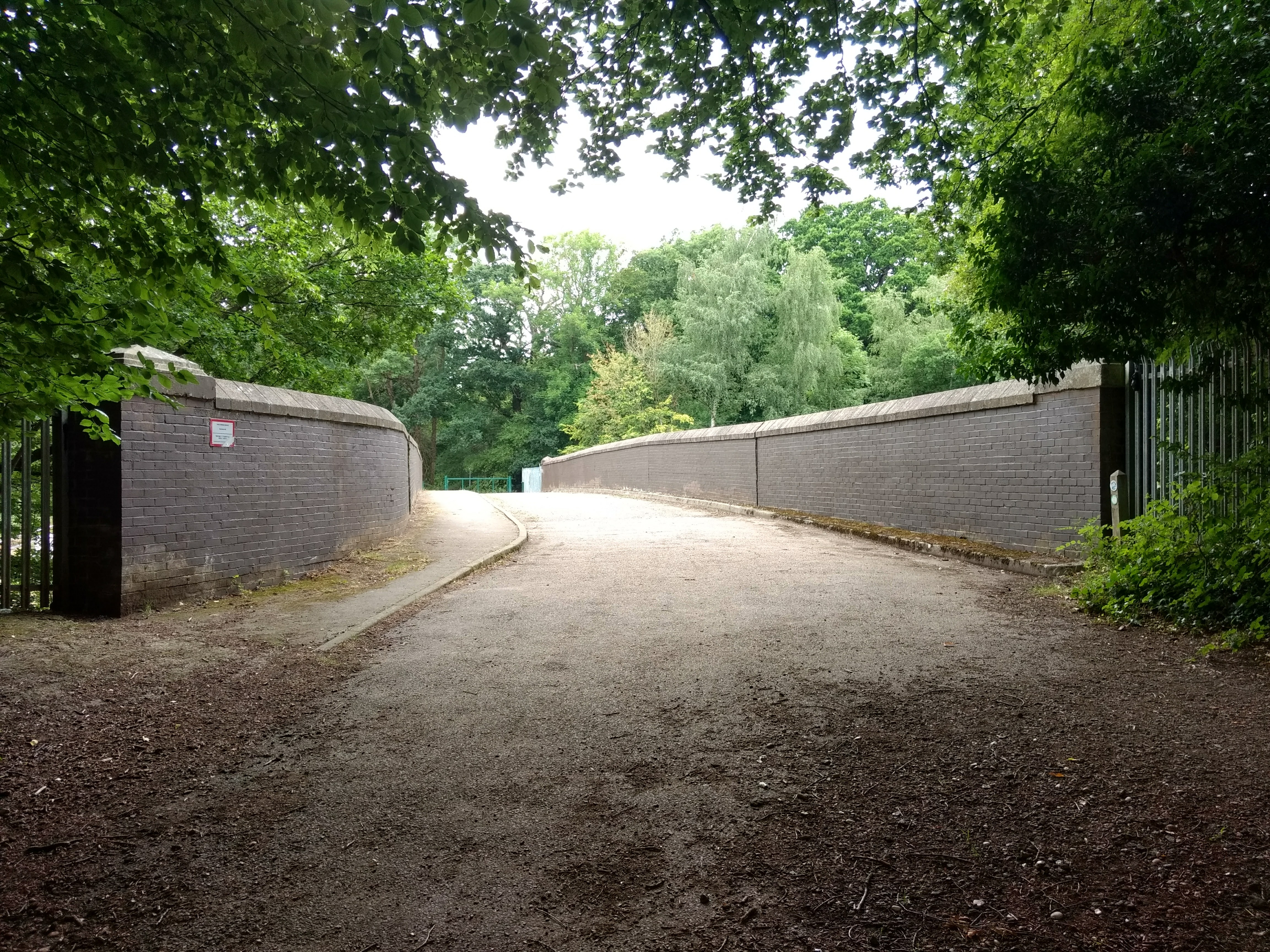
Greenwood-Folly Farm Bridge (far left on map) looking west

Folly Farm, originally Folly House, on the southern edge of Monken Hadley Common, was a farm that dated from 1686 and became a popular recreation site in the early 20th century. The site is now occupied by the Jewish Community Secondary School.

== Location ==
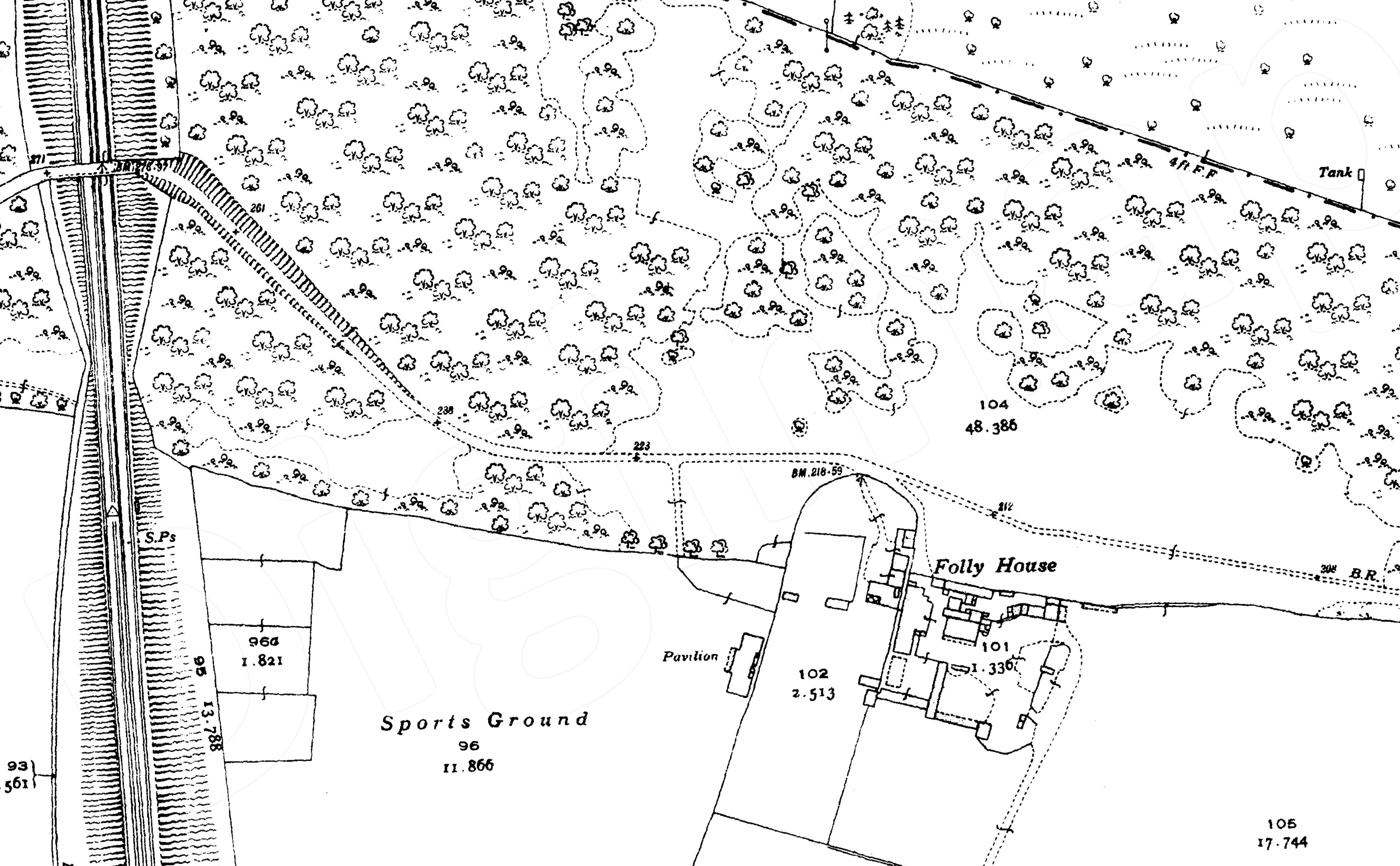
Location of Folly House on a 1930s Ordnance Survey map.

The house and farm was on the bridle path between Cockfosters and Monken Hadley that still exists and runs along the southern edge of Monken Hadley Common. It was located on an area of level ground where the track became Hadley Wood Road before climbing Newman's Hill and crossing the Great Northern Railway at Greenwood-Folly Farm Bridge.

== History ==
Folly House was built by Thomas Turpin in 1686. According to Frederick Cass, who consulted the Survey of Enfield Chace in Hadley parish chest, Turpin was "Mr. Secretary Coventry's servant."

In 1776 the house was marked on Francis Russell's map of Enfield Chase as "The Folly". The house came into the ownership of Francis Barroneau of New Lodge, South Mimms (died 1814) in the late 18th century, whose widow Elizabeth (died 1846) transferred the estate of 67 acres to her nephew the Reverend Robert Francis Wilson. His son, Thomas Percival Wilson, placed it in trust for Edward Hanson Freshfield in 1904. In 1913, the estate, then of 53 acres, was transferred to E.H. Lefroy and the Reverend. F.L. Deane. In 1919, 22 acres were sold to S. Maw & Sons, who sold that to East Barnet U.D.C. in 1936.

The farm was used for military parades during the First World War and as the site for victory celebrations in 1919. Before the Second World War, the Frusher family used the farm to fatten pigs in the winter and as a popular recreation site in the summer.

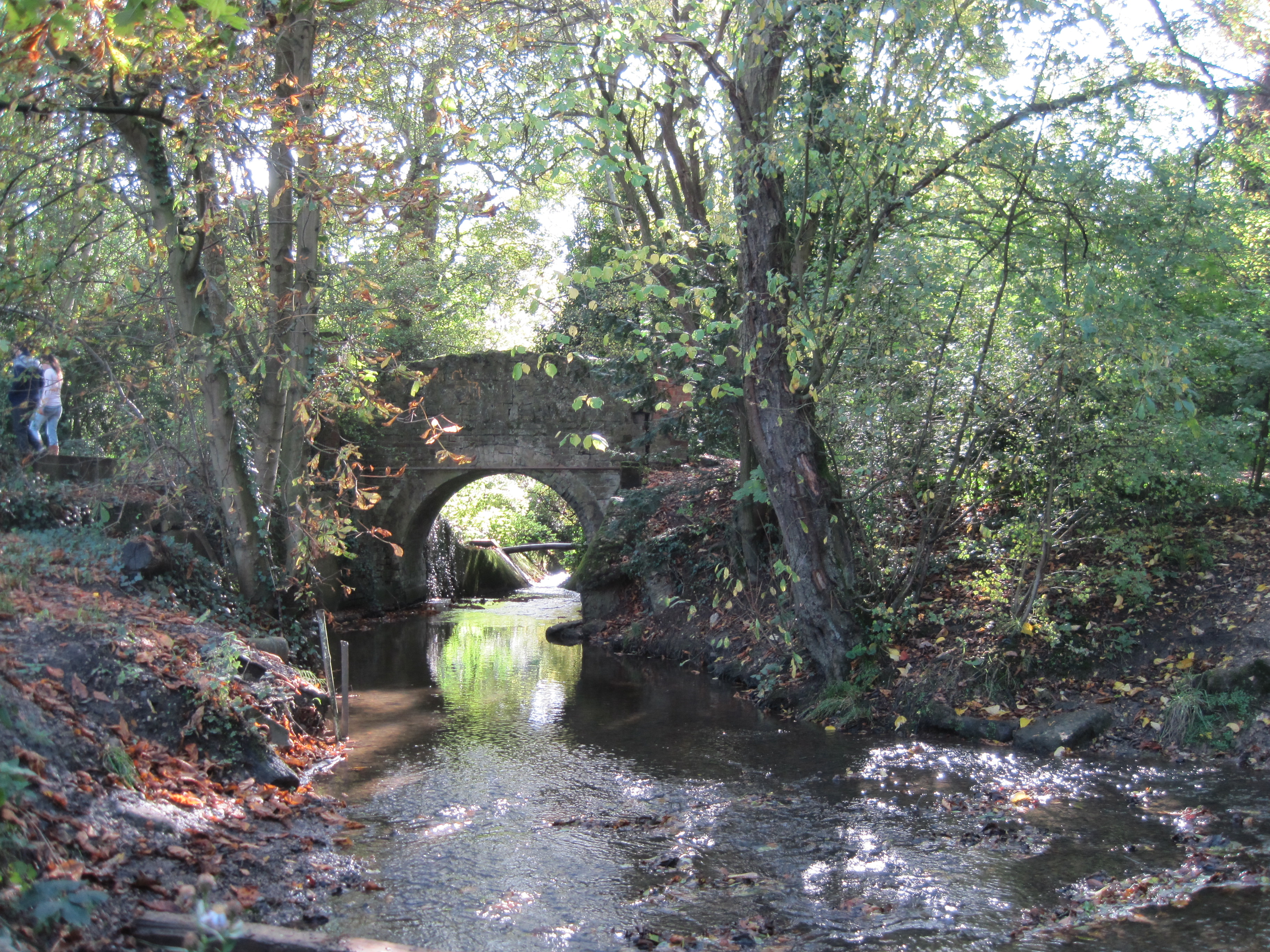
Folly Bridge, Monken Hadley Common.

Nearby Beech Hill Lake, not part of the farm, was an additional local attraction. On the south side of the lake is Folly Bridge over the Pymmes Brook.

The John Hampden Secondary School was built on the site after its original buildings in Victoria Road were damaged by fire around 1961. Access was from Westbrook Crescent. The school moved to Chestnut Grove in 2010 where it is now known as East Barnet School, and the buildings at Westbrook Crescent were replaced with the newly built Jewish Community Secondary School in 2010.

== See also ==
- Ludgrove Hall
