= Beech Hill Park =

Building in Hadley Wood, London, England

Coordinates: 51.6655°N 0.1640°W

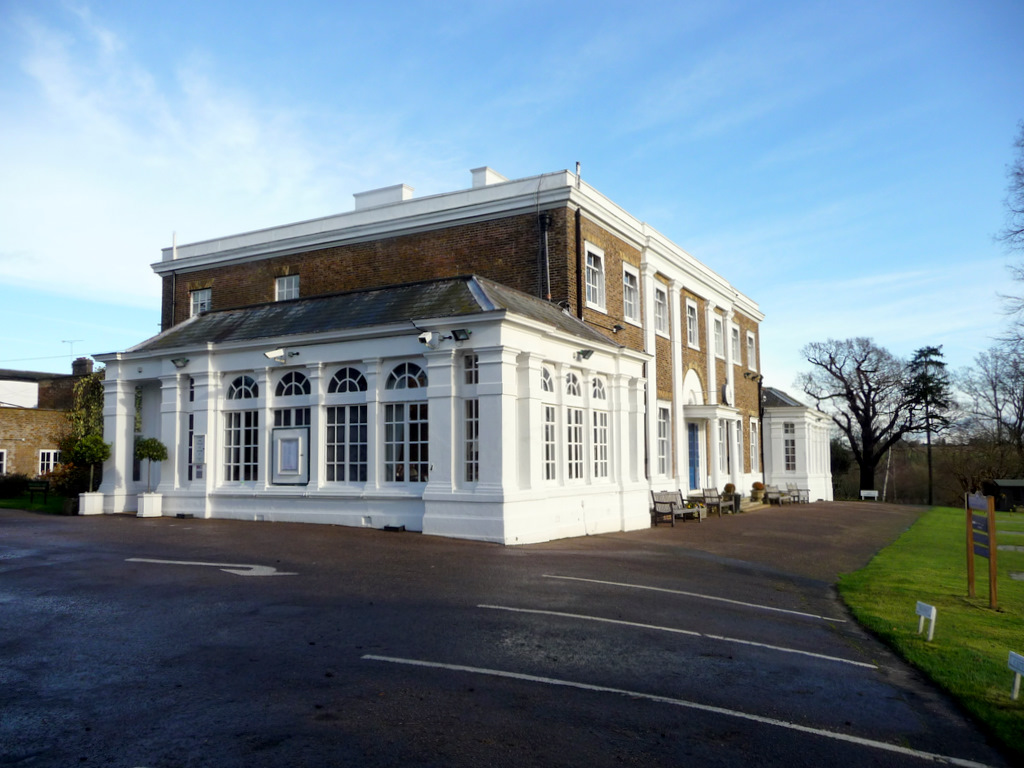
Beech Hill Park in 2012.

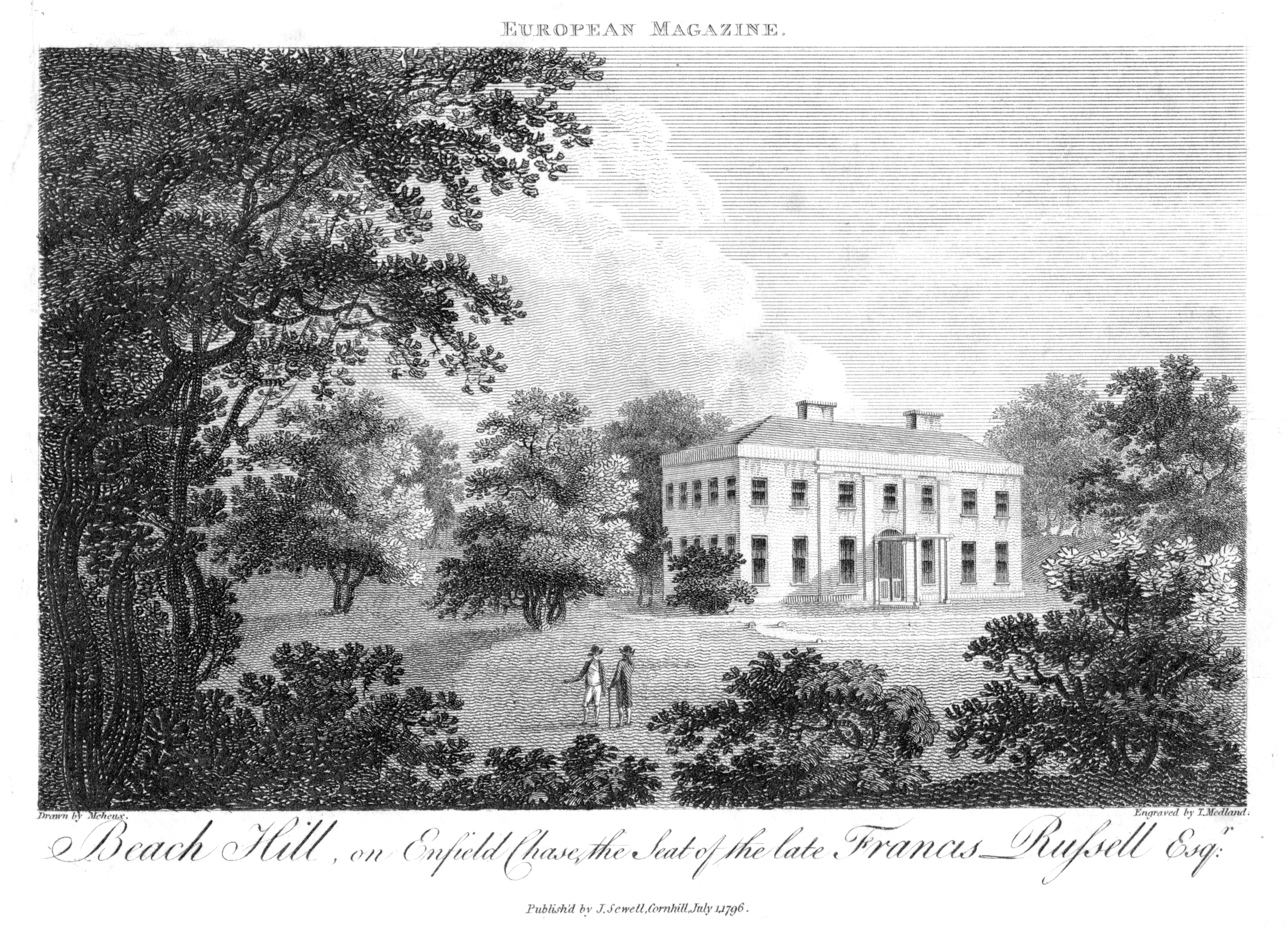
Beech Hill Park, as illustrated in European Magazine, 1 July 1796.

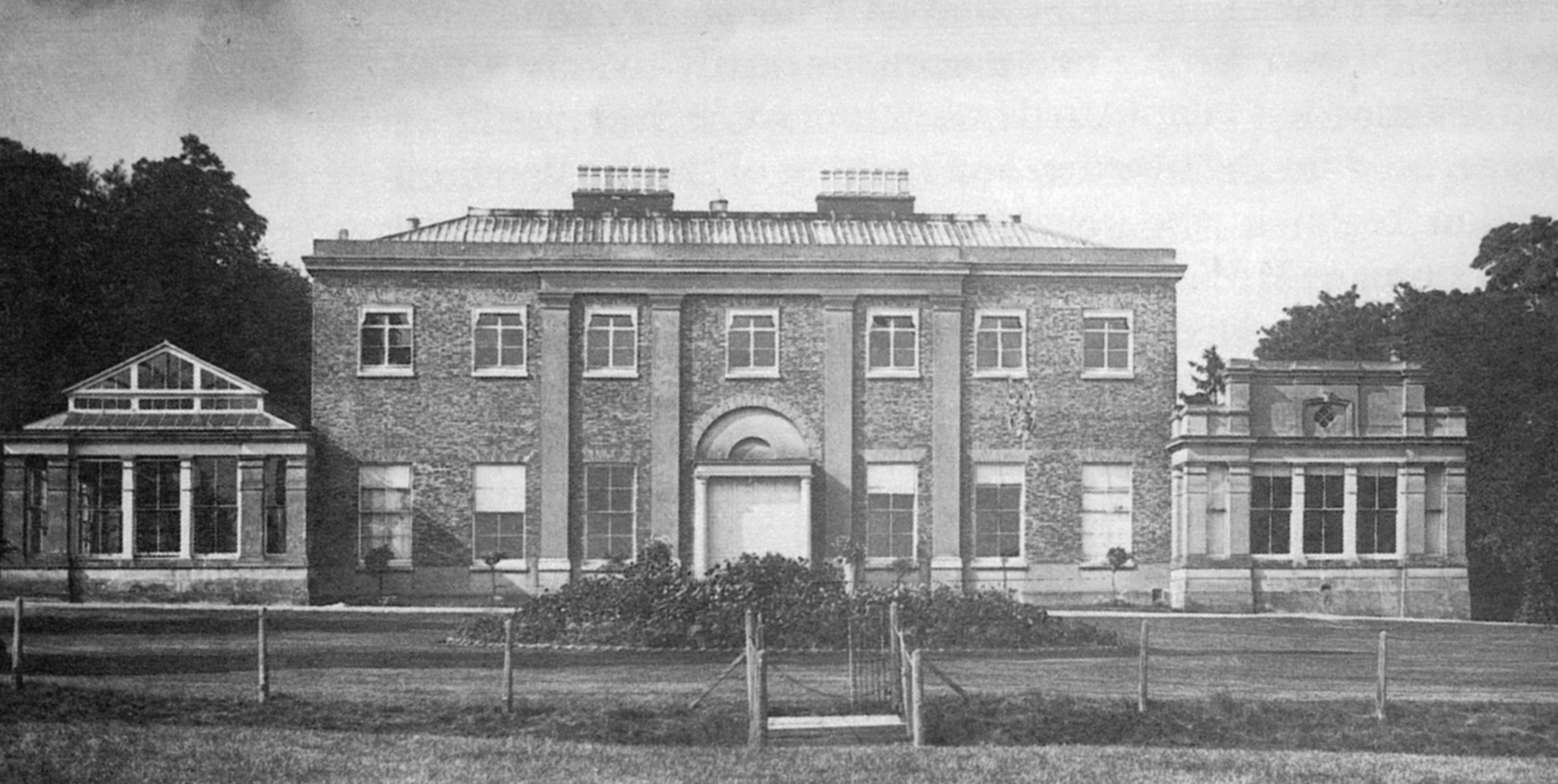
Beech Hill Park c. 1905.

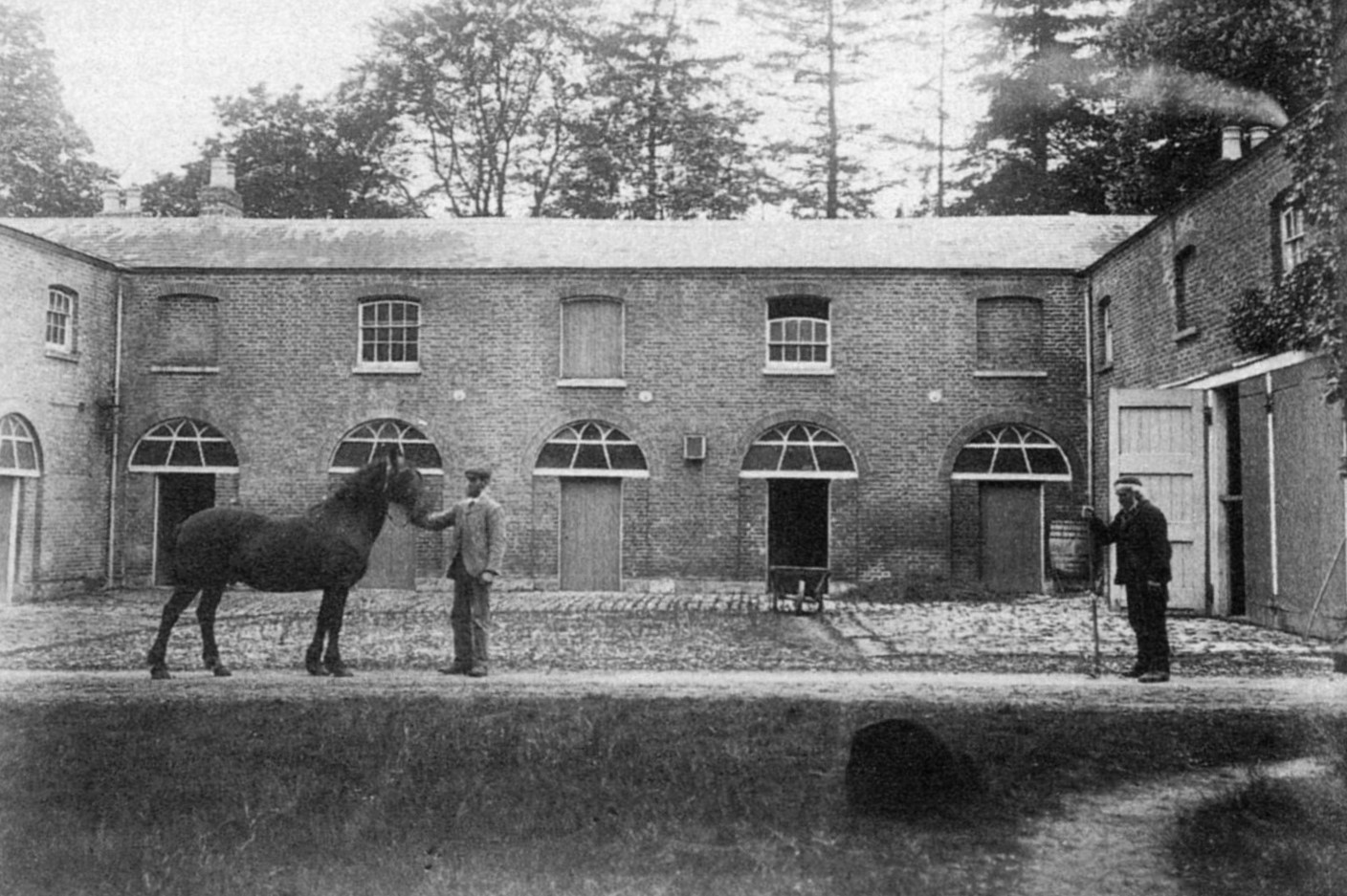
The stables at Beech Hill Park, c. 1905.

Beech Hill Park is a Grade II listed building off Beech Hill in Hadley Wood, North London, that is used today as the club house of Hadley Wood Golf Course. It was built in 1781 for Francis Russell, secretary and surveyor to the Duchy of Lancaster, on land he received when Enfield Chase was broken up. It was later in the ownership of Charles Jack, a property developer who was primarily responsible for the development of Hadley Wood.

== History ==
The house was built in 1781 for Francis Russell (1740–1795), surveyor to the Duchy of Lancaster when Enfield Chase was broken up, as part of the 152 acres that Russell received at that time. It was originally known as Russell Mansion.

The house and estate were acquired by William Franks in 1790. It was occupied by female members of his family after his death in 1797 before being purchased by Archibald Paris in 1800 who took up residence in 1805 and stayed until he moved into a rebuilt West Lodge in 1834.

From 1835 the house was leased to Sir Edward Barnes and occupied after his death in 1838 by his widow and then by his brother George.

In 1854, Charles Jack (1810–1896), who was primarily responsible for the development of Hadley Wood, acquired the freehold of the property.

The single-storey pavilions in white on either side of the house are mid-nineteenth century additions.

During the First World War, the house was used as billets for soldiers of the Royal Fusiliers.

Around 1921, the house and estate were purchased from the estate of Charles Jack by a consortium of Hadley Wood residents led by Walter Warwick and his brother-in-law Sir Frederick Lewis (later Lord Essendon). The main house was converted into a club house according to plans by the architect Cyril Wontner-Smith who also bought one of the buildings in the grounds which he converted into a home for himself. The golf club opened in 1922 with a course designed by Alister MacKenzie.

The house is grade II listed with Historic England. The stable range nearby is also listed.

== Occupants ==
- 1781–1790: Francis Russell
- 1790–1797: William Franks and his wife Jane
- 1797– at least 1802: Jane or Mary Franks
- 1805–1835: Archibald Paris (owner from 1800)
- 1835–1838: Sir Edward Barnes
- 1838–1847: Lady Barnes (widow of Sir Edward)
- 1847–1854: George Barnes (brother of Sir Edward)
- 1854–1896: Charles Jack
- ?
- 1921- : Hadley Wood golf club
