= Folly Farm =

The term Folly Farm may refer to:

== Buildings ==
in the United Kingdom

- Folly Farm Adventure Park and Zoo, a park in Pembrokeshire, Wales
- Folly Farm, Somerset, a farm and nature reserve in England
- Folly Farm, Sulhamstead, a house in Berkshire, England
- Folly Farm, a listed building in Lawshall, Suffolk, England
- Folly Farm, Barnet, a popular recreation spot before the Second World War

in the United States

- Folly Farm, an historic house associated with the Shrine of St. Anthony (Maryland)

== Other ==
- Folly Farm, a book by English philosopher C. E. M. Joad
