= Charles Jack =

Irish farmer and landowner (1810–1896)

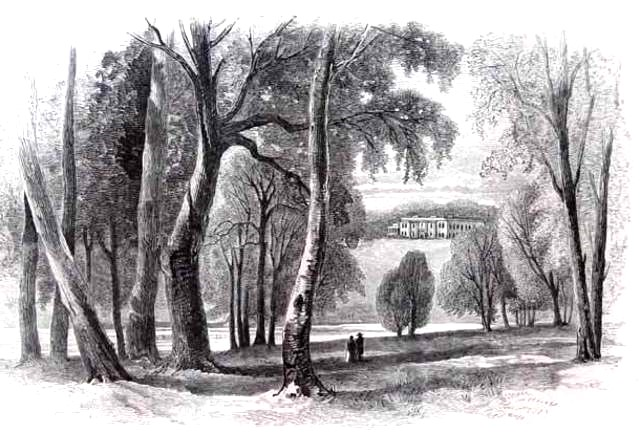
"Beech-Hill-Park, the Seat of Charles Jack Esq." From Edward Ford, A History of Enfield in the County of Middlesex, 1873

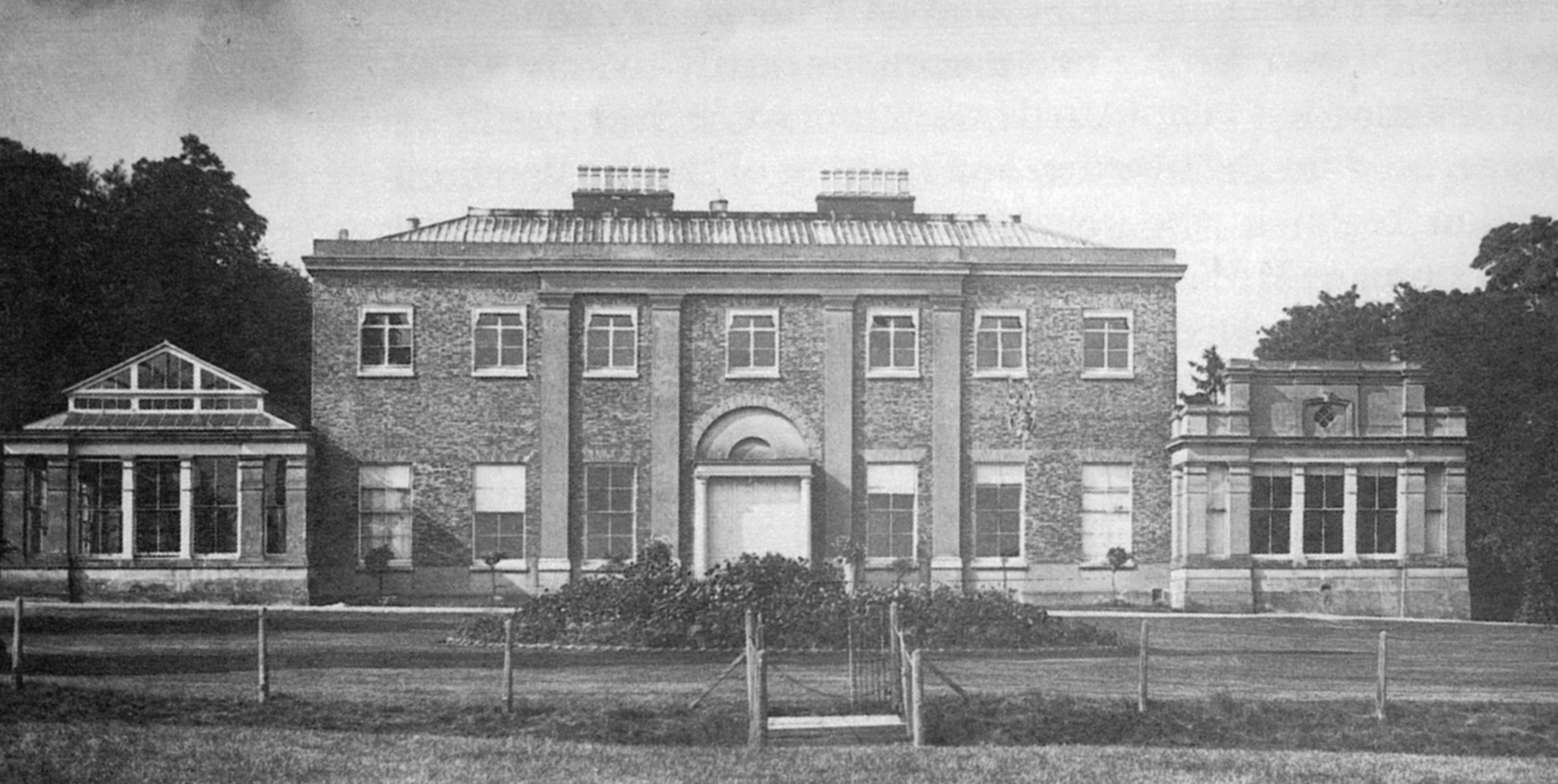
Beech Hill Park c. 1905

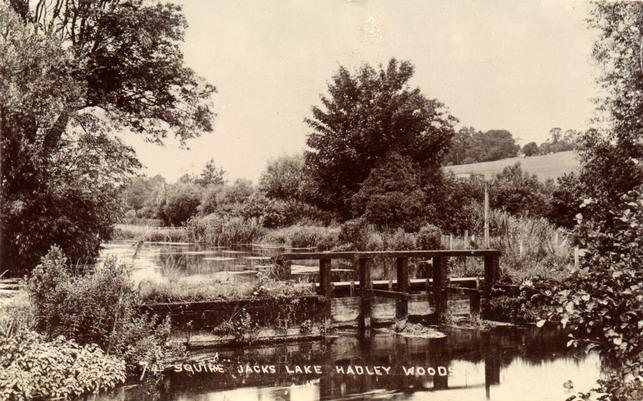
A postcard, c. 1900, marked "Squire Jacks Lake Hadley Woods"

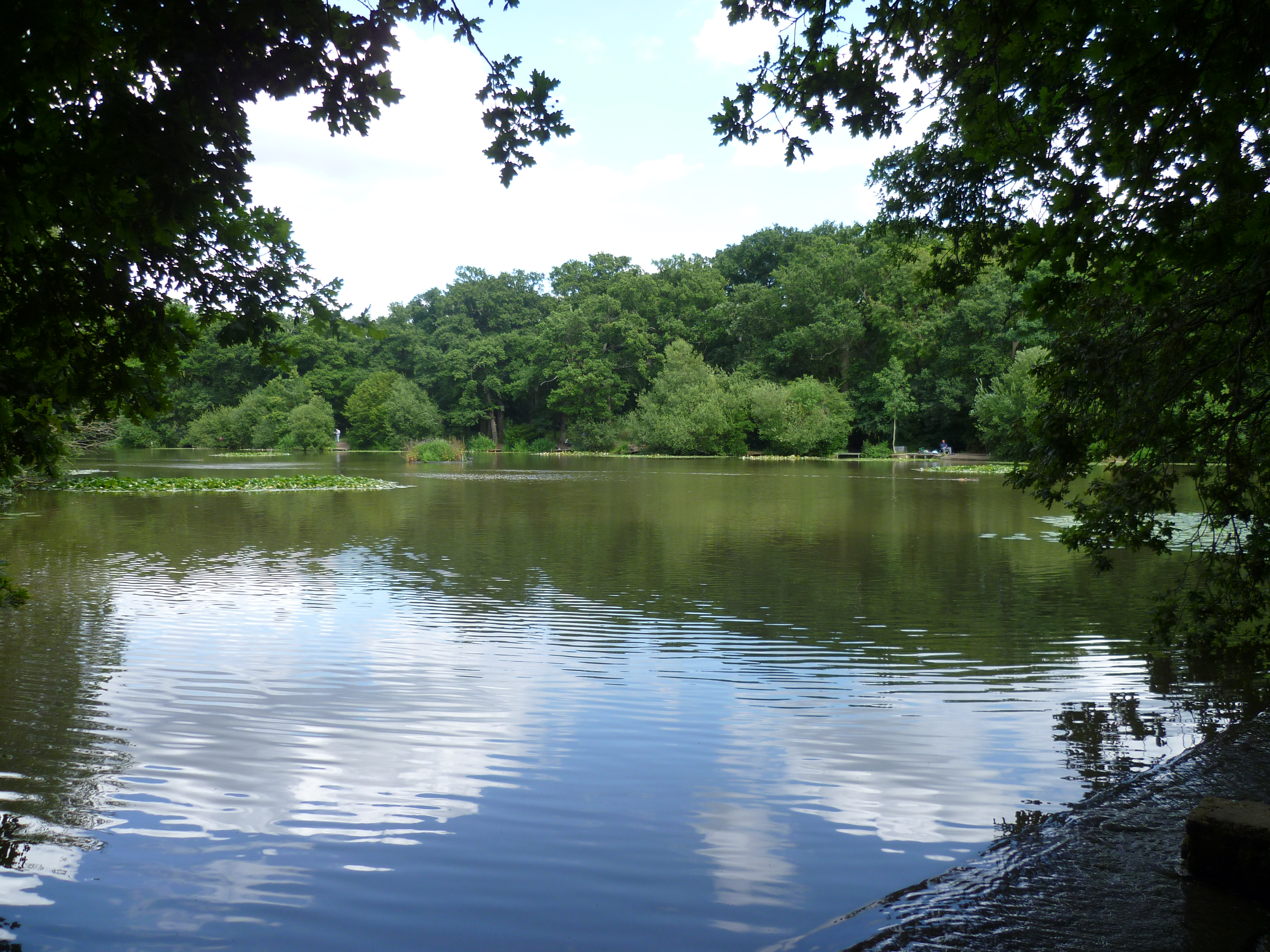
Jack's Lake, Monken Hadley Common

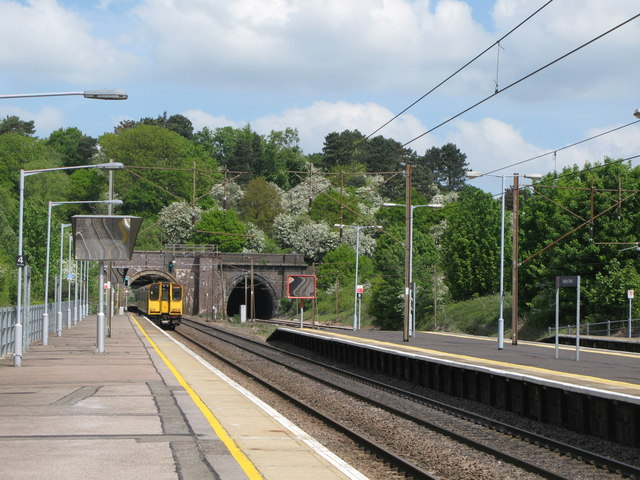
Hadley Wood railway station, built as a result of Jack's negotiations

Charles Jack (1810 – 22 April 1896) was an Irish farmer and landowner who was primarily responsible for the construction of Hadley Wood from the late 1880s, and the building of Hadley Wood railway station.

== Hadley Wood ==
Jack was born in Ballinasloe, Ireland. He was the tenant of Beech Hill Park and estate outside London. The estate was created in 1777 by Francis Russell, secretary to the Duchy of Lancaster, when Enfield Chase was broken up. Seeing the potential of the area, Jack developed plans for a housing estate on the land that he owned and adjacent land that he leased from the Duchy. The estate was originally to be known as Beech Hill Park Estate, but became Hadley Wood after the railway station opened under that name in April 1885.

Jack negotiated with the Duchy for the grant of a building lease, which he received for 99 years from 20 March 1882 on 20 March 1884. In return he surrendered his original lease with the Duchy which had been taken out in 1838 and assigned to Jack by George Barnes in 1854.

Jack also negotiated with the Great Northern Railway for the construction of a station on the estate between the existing stations of New Barnet to the south and Potters Bar to the north, both of which had opened in 1850.

== Family ==
Jack was married to Mary and had sons Arthur Joseph Jack and Thomas Godfrey Jack, and several daughters.

== Death and legacy ==
Jack died on 22 April 1896 after which his business interests passed into the hands of trustees.

Beech Hill Lake in Monken Hadley Common is still more commonly known locally as Jack's Lake, one of the three lakes originally created in the 1880s as estate lakes.
