= William Franks (died 1790) =

English property developer

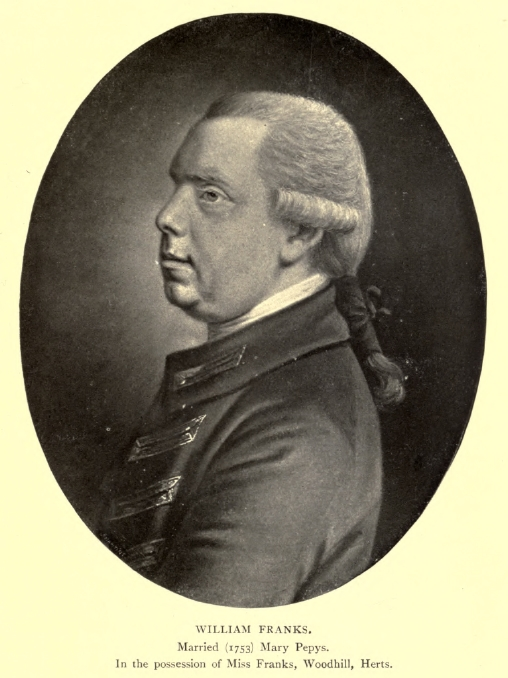
William Franks, n.d.

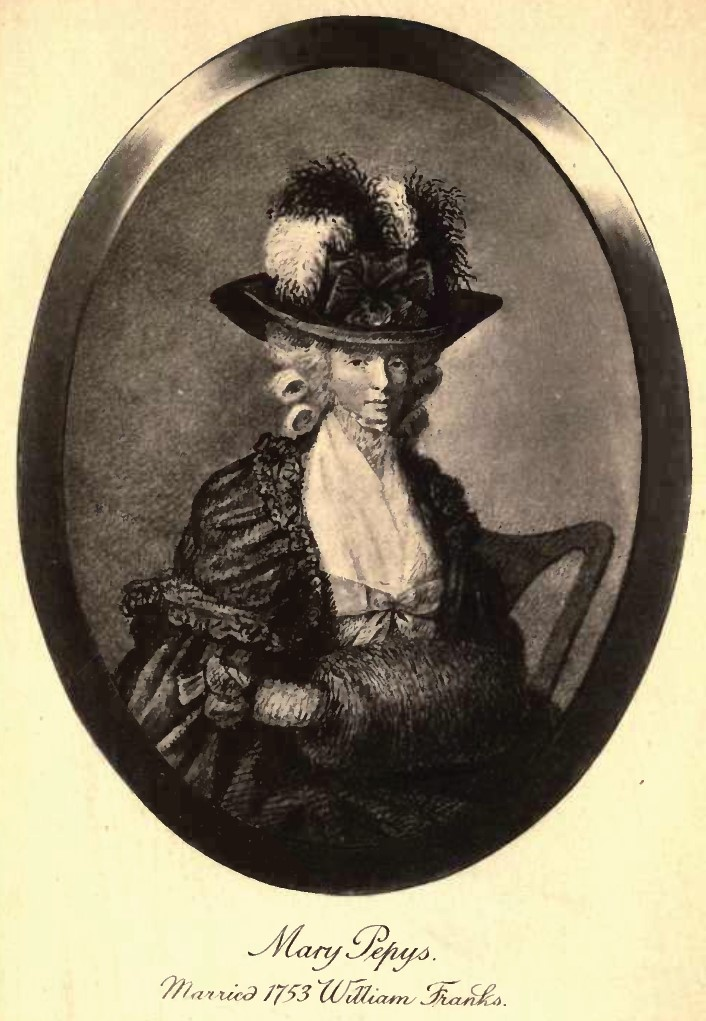
Mary Pepys, n.d.

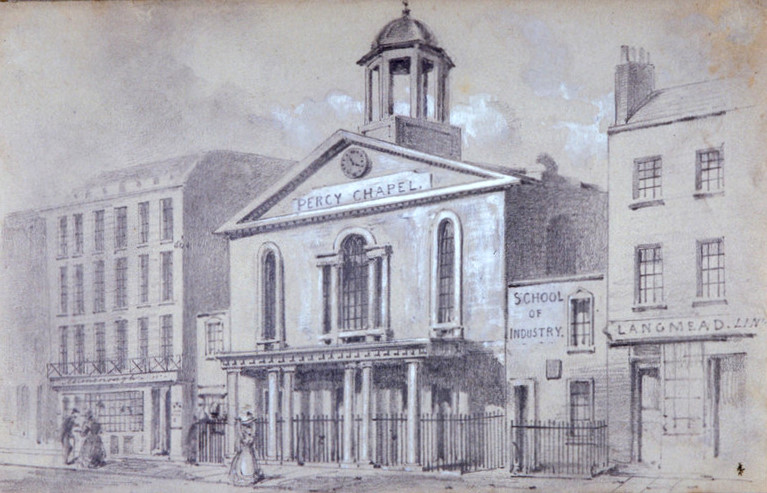
The Percy Chapel, Charlotte Street, in 1857. Source: Guildhall, City of London.

William Franks (died 1790) was an early English property developer who was instrumental in the development of Percy Street, Rathbone Street and Charlotte Street in central London in the area now known as Fitzrovia. He married a member of the Pepys family and built the Percy Chapel in Charlotte Street.

== Family ==
Franks married Mary Pepys, a relative of the diarist Samuel Pepys, in 1753. They had one child, William. Mary died in 1805.

== Building works ==
In the 1760s, Franks, a "gentleman", was granted various building leases by land-owners Francis and William Goodge on ground in the area now known as Fitzrovia. As a result of these leases he was responsible for the construction of large parts of Percy Street, Rathbone Street and Charlotte Street. In 1764–65, he built the Percy Chapel in Charlotte Street which was opened in January 1766. The lease was purchased by Michael Duffield in 1766. The chapel was demolished in 1867. It stood immediately opposite the western end of Windmill Street.

Also in 1765, Franks granted a lease to Joseph Francis of the house which is now The Marquis of Granby public house.

== Death ==
Franks died in 1790. A memorial tablet and floorslab exists to his memory in St John the Baptist church, Kentish Town.
