= Horsforth Golf Club =

Golf course in Horsforth, England

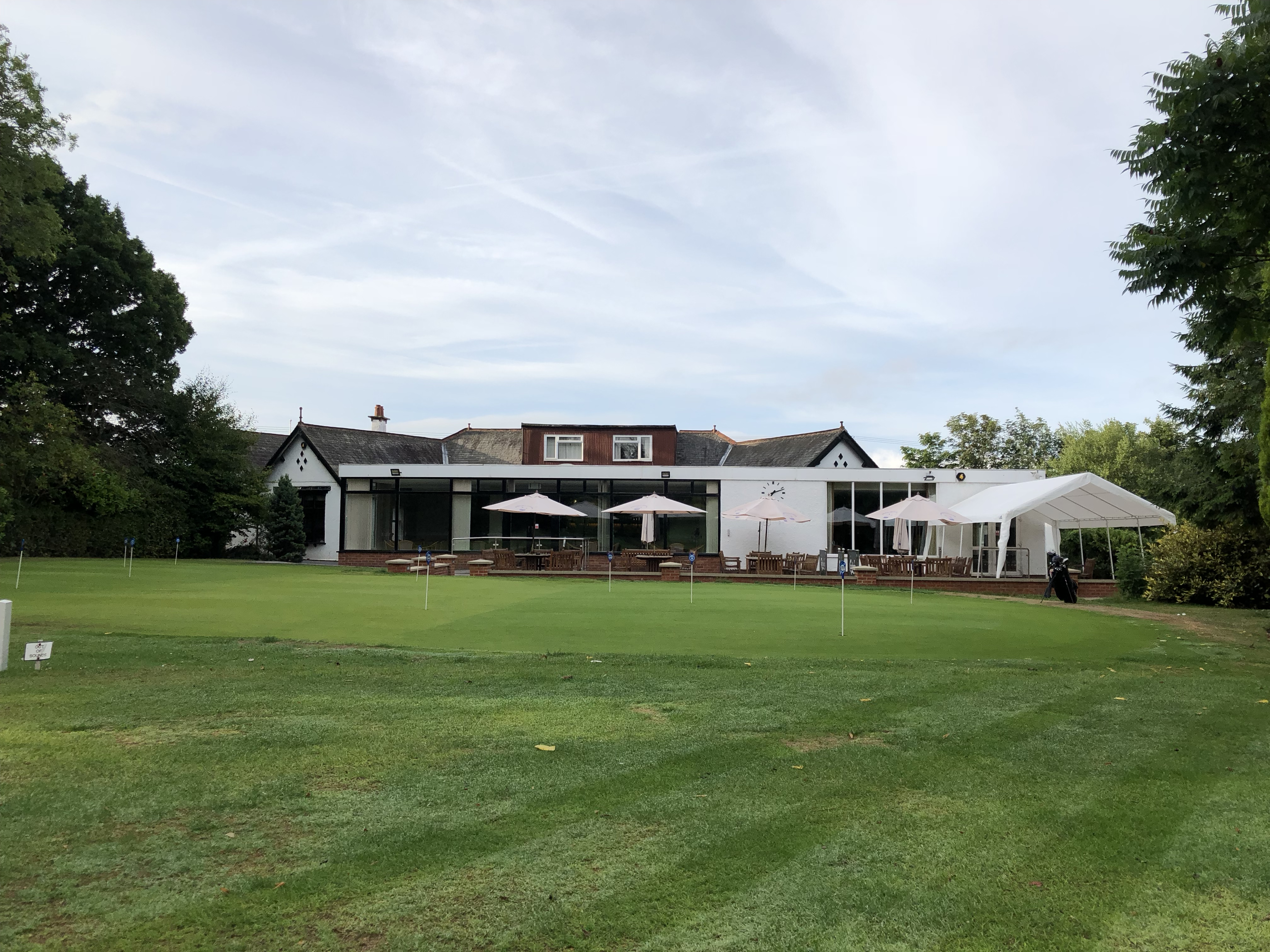
- Horsforth Golf Club

- Location within West Yorkshire
- 53.8509°N 1.6575°W

Club information
- Location: Horsforth, West Yorkshire, England
- Established: 1906
- Type: Private
- Tota holes: 18
- Website: www.horsforthgolfclub.co.uk
- Designed by: Alister MacKenzie (1913); James Braid (1925); Frank Pennink (1964)
- Par: 71
- Length: 6,329 yards (5,787 m)

Horsforth Golf Club is a golf club in the town of Horsforth in West Yorkshire, England. It is located next to Leeds Bradford Airport. It was established in 1906 and celebrated its centenary in 2006.

== History ==
Horsforth Golf Club was formed by a number of residents called together by Messrs. T. Clough and H. Whitfield at a house owned by Mr W.H. Billington on Outwood Lane in Horsforth on 8 November 1906.

On 8 February 1907 it was agreed to take a lease on a site on the Rawdon estate from Walter Egerton John Green-Emmott, of Emmott Hall, at a rent of £140 per year. The club was formally named Horsforth Golf Club at the first General meeting of the Club on 7 March 1907. Sir William Duncan, Bart, of Horsforth Hall was invited to become the first President and Mr H Whitfield was appointed the first Captain. The clubhouse had its opening ceremony on 10 August 1907.

The course was initially laid out by the Greens Committee and the first Professional and Green-keeper, Mr T Tate. The course designer Alister MacKenzie visited the course in 1913 and made various recommendations for improvements and a scheme for bunkering the course.

The original clubhouse was destroyed by fire on 26 January 1913 and was rebuilt on its current site, reopening on 6 September 1913 at a cost of £1450. It was reported in the Leeds Mercury that the Suffragette Movement also caused damage to the club on 20 February 1913 affecting the eighteenth green and setting fire to a movable shed used by the members as temporary accommodation. Vote for Women leaflets were left, leaving no doubt as to who the perpetrators were.

In 1925 James Braid was invited to inspect the course, which he did on 19 March 1925, and provided a report for a fee of £14-5-0d. Many of his suggestions were adopted. In 1964, the golf course architect Frank Pennink was asked to appraise the course and help with its redevelopment after new land was bought in compensation for the loss of land taken over by the adjacent airport.

== Scorecard ==
Horsforth Golf Club
Tee	Rating/Slope	1	2	3	4	5	6	7	8	9	Out	10	11	12	13	14	15	16	17	18	In	Total
Par	Men's	4	4	3	4	4	5	4	4	3	35	4	3	4	4	4	3	5	4	5	36	71
White	71.2/132	330	348	166	377	281	529	440	397	184	3012	355	170	375	324	419	197	484	366	558	3246	6329
Yellow	69.4/129	316	335	145	331	257	512	405	392	162	2875	346	161	354	314	390	194	452	355	535	3101	5957
Par	Women's	4	4	3	4	4	5	5	4	3	36	4	3	4	4	4	3	5	4	5	36	72
Red	72.9/131	277	295	131	324	266	473	398	367	145	2704	289	153	349	288	364	189	390	323	472	2817	5490

== Gallery ==
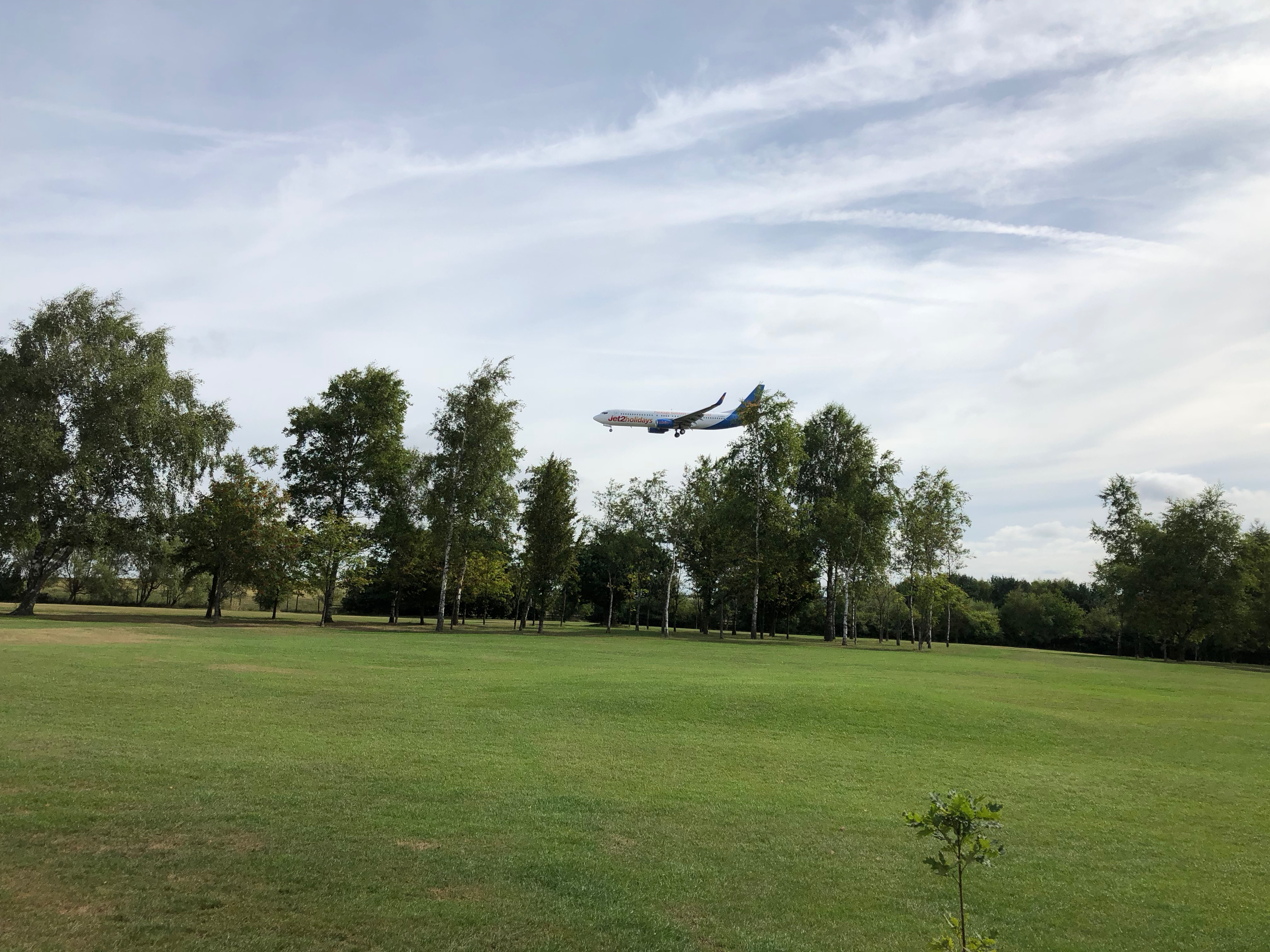
An aeroplane landing at Leeds Bradford Airport, taken from the golf course

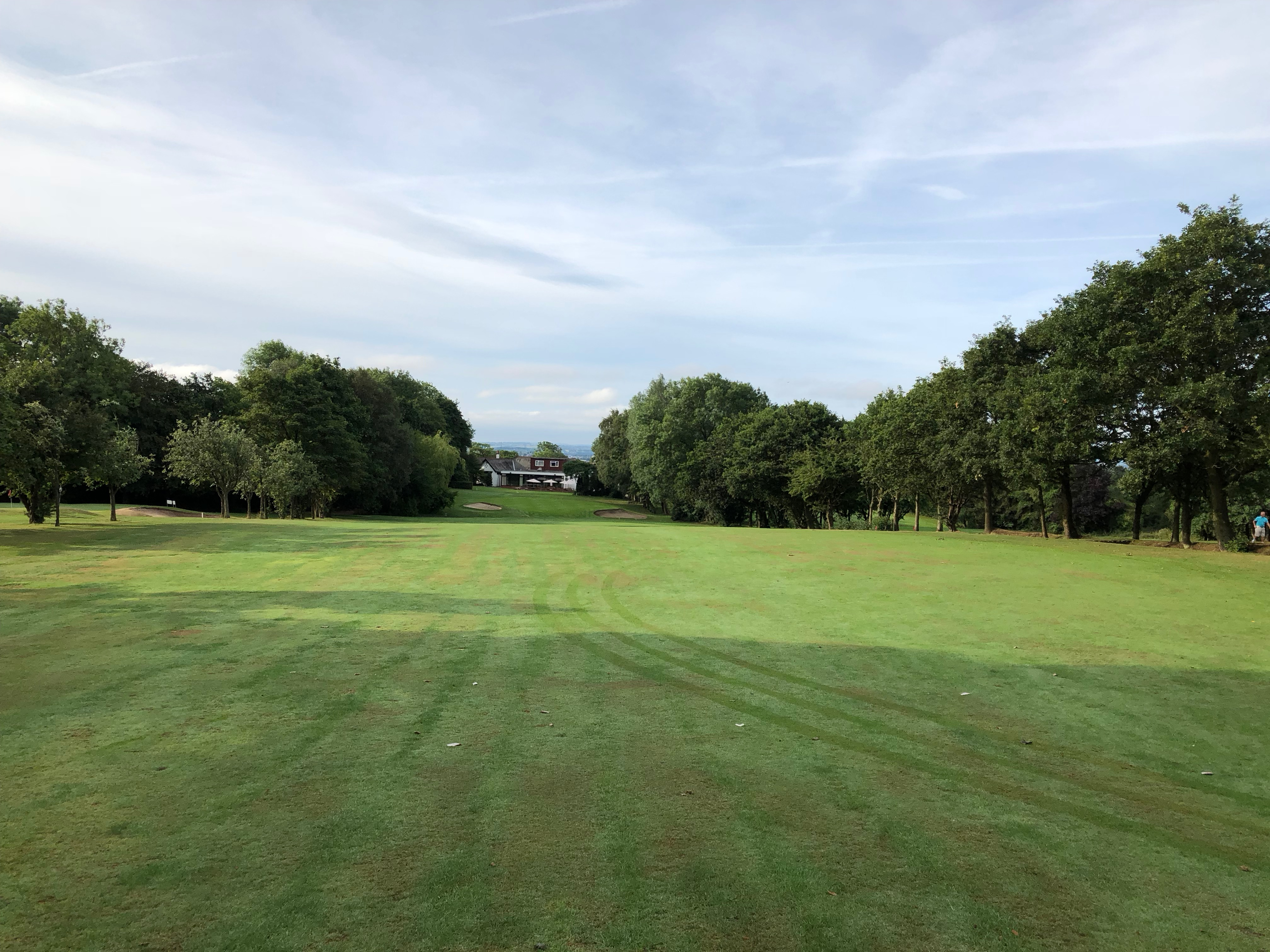
Horsforth Golf Club looking down 18th fairway
