= Hadley Wood Golf Course =

Coordinates: 51.6655°N 0.1640°W

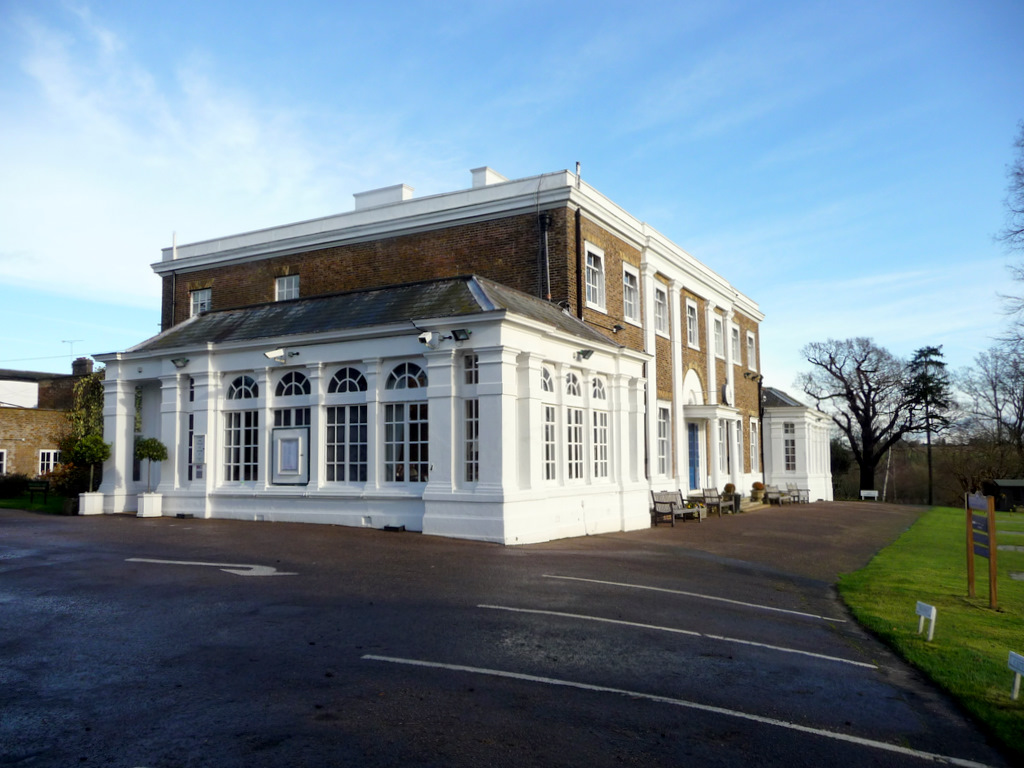
Hadley Wood Gold Club House

Hadley Wood Golf Course is a golf course in Hadley Wood, in the London Borough of Enfield. The course opened in 1922 in the grounds of Beech Hill Park, a grade II listed building. The associated stables are also grade II listed. The course was designed by Dr. Alister MacKenzie.
