= Hadley Wood =

Suburb of London, England

Coordinates: 51.66205°N 0.17245°W

- Location within Greater London
- OS grid reference: TQ265975
- London borough: Enfield; Barnet
- Ceremonial county: Greater London
- Region: London
- Country: England
- Sovereign state: United Kingdom
- Post town: BARNET
- Postcode district: EN4
- Dialling code: 020
- Police: Metropolitan
- Fire: London
- Ambulance: London
- UK Parliament: Southgate and Wood Green
- London Assembly: Enfield and Haringey; Barnet and Camden

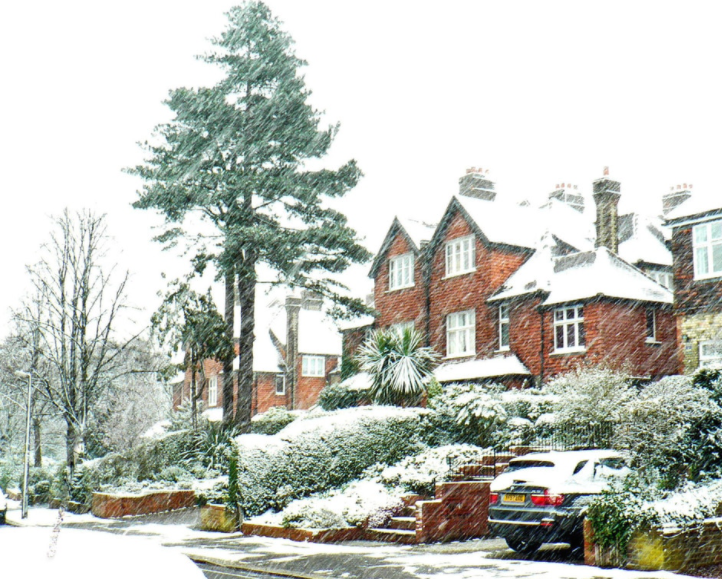
Crescent West on a snowy day.

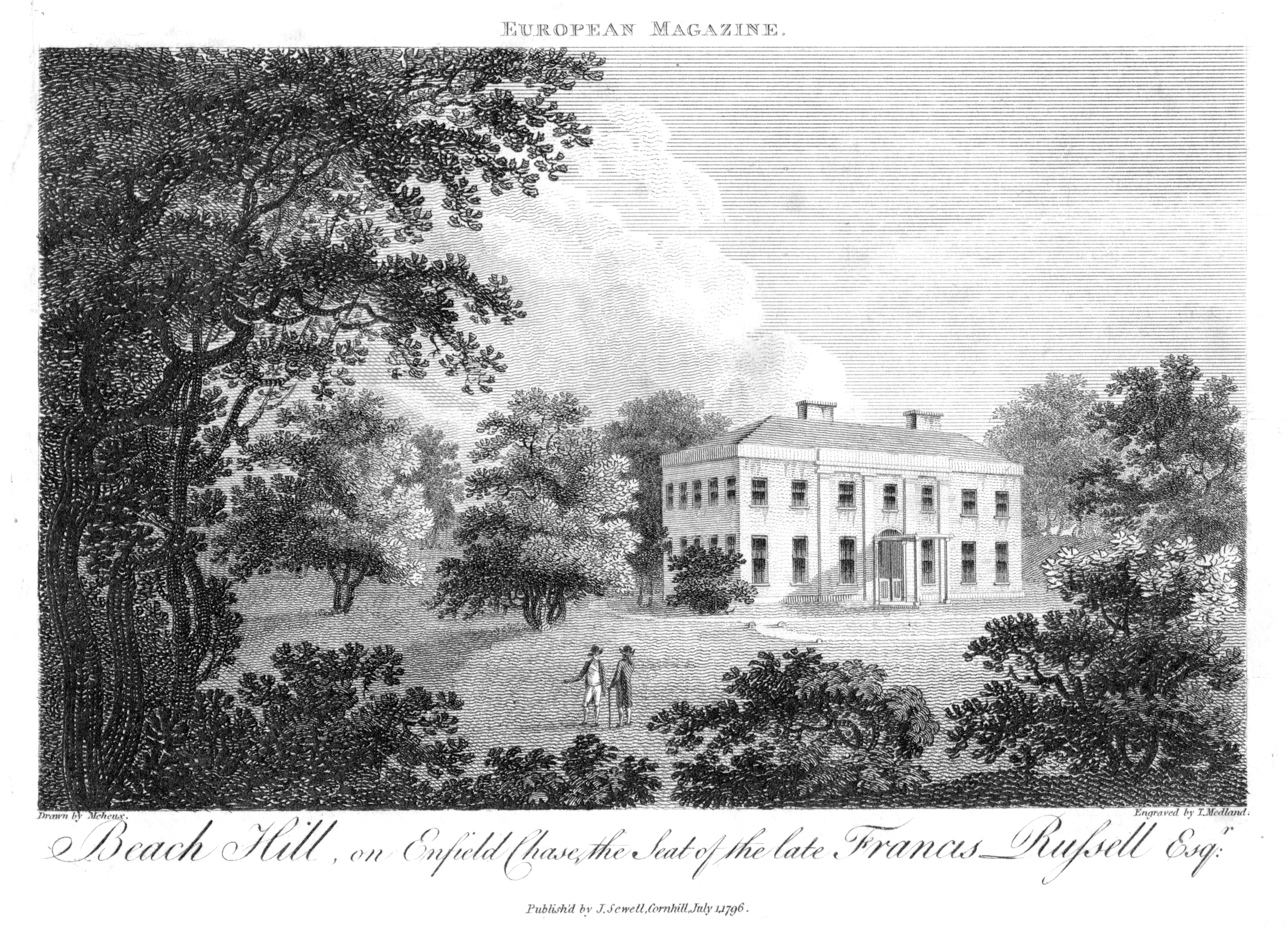
Beech Hill Park, as illustrated in European Magazine, 1 July 1796.

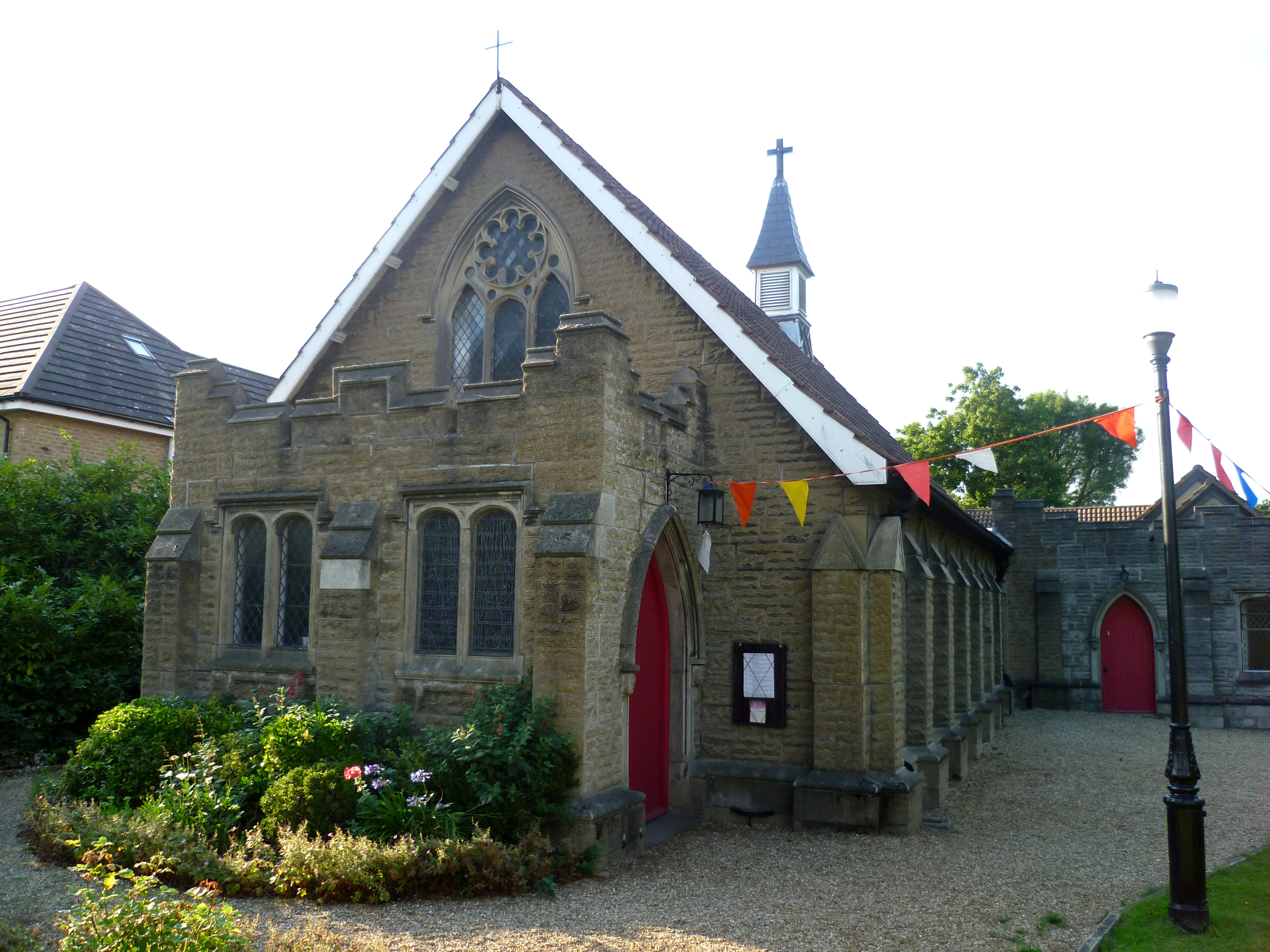
St Paul's Church, the first church in Hadley Wood. Built in concrete in 1910–11 to the plan of Albert Kingwell.

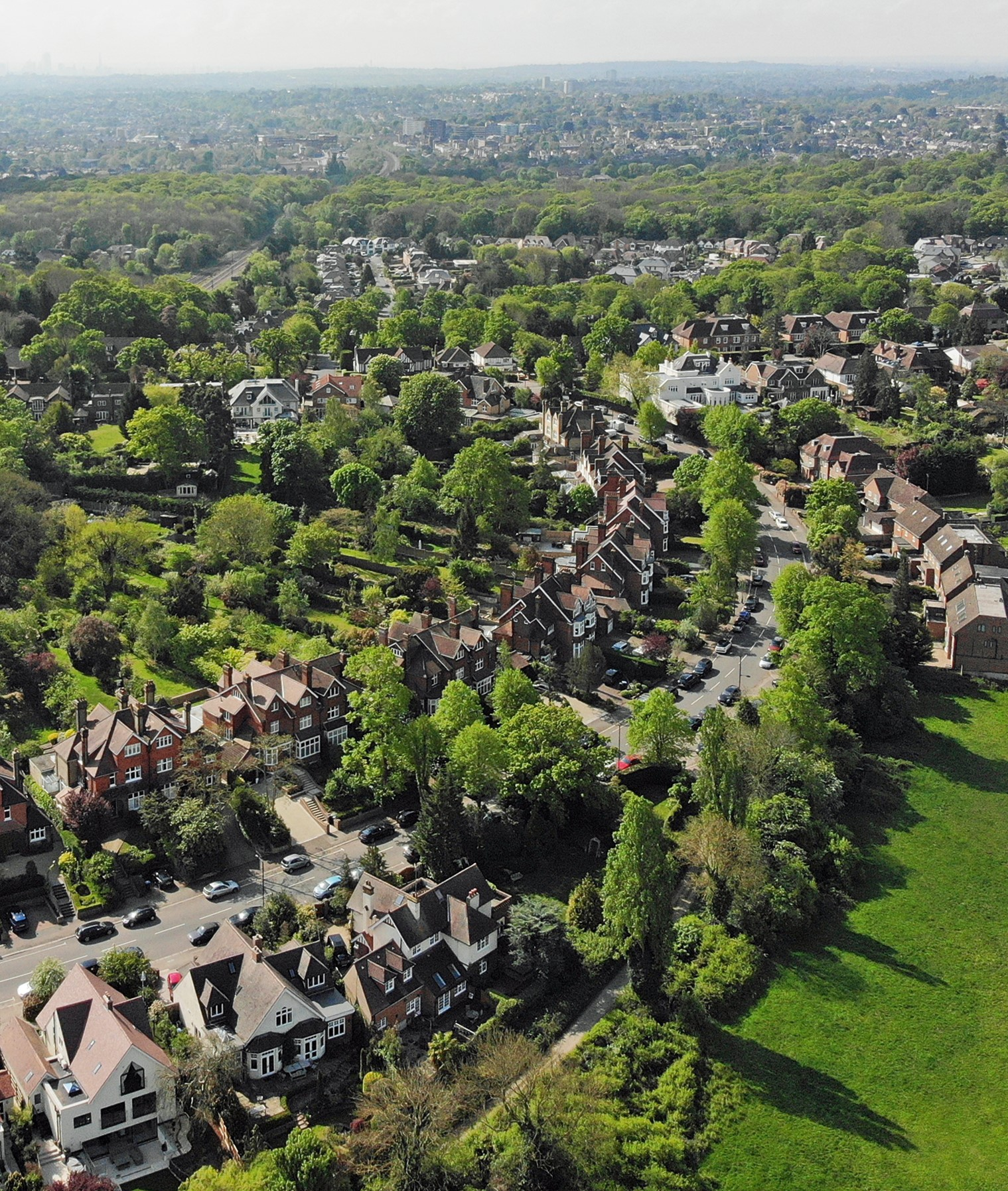
Aerial view of Crescent West, looking south-west.

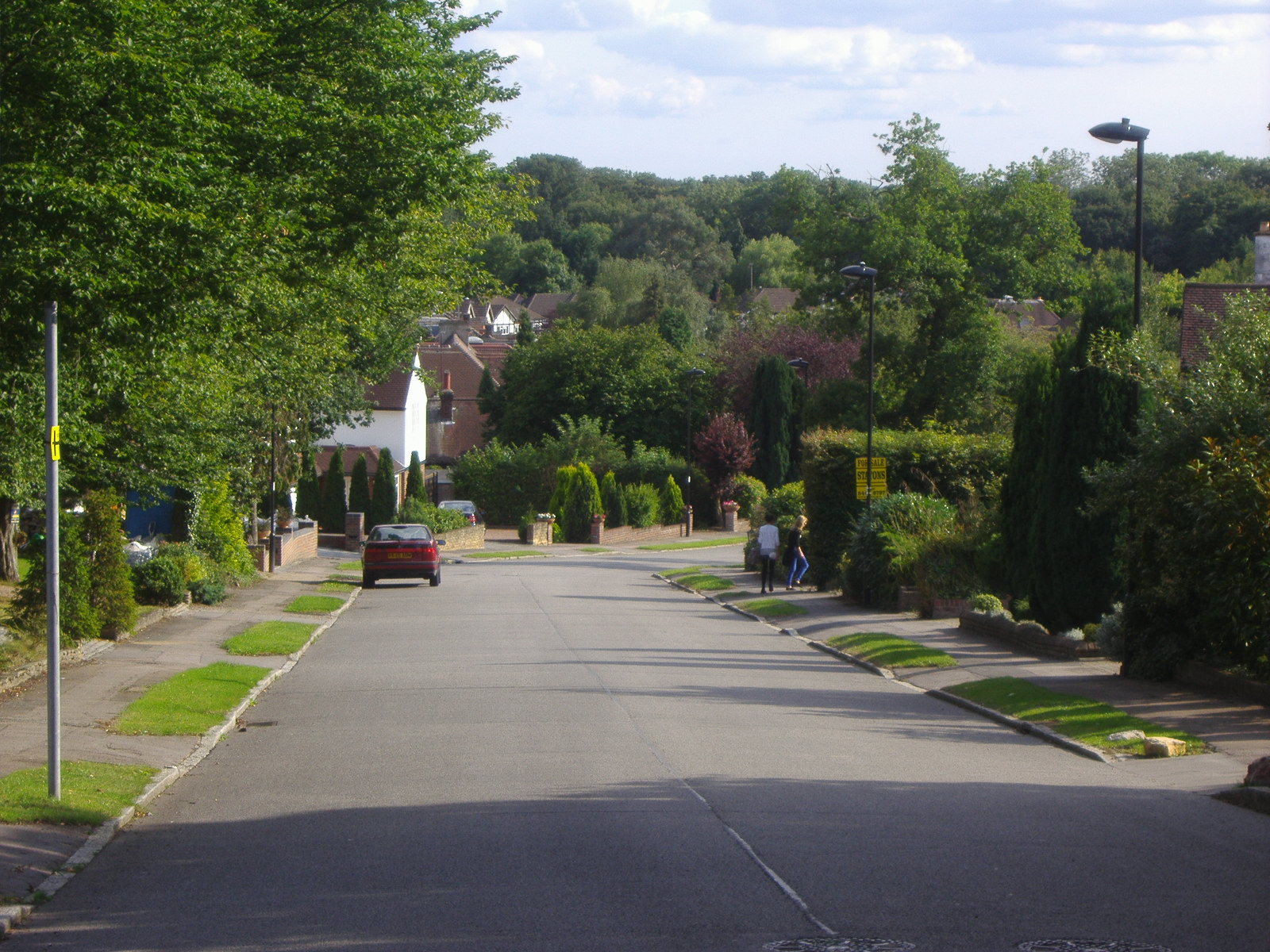
A view of Parkgate Avenue

Hadley Wood is suburb of north London, close to the border with Hertfordshire. It is part of the London Borough of Enfield, 11 miles (17.7 km) north of Charing Cross, close to Chipping Barnet.

== History ==
The area in which Hadley Wood is situated is part of the historical hunting grounds of Enfield Chase, and some of the land that has been part of the estate of the Sovereign since 1399 remains to this day owned by the Duchy of Lancaster.

The Act of Disenchasement of 1777 divided Enfield Chase into plots for sale as agricultural leases. Much of the work was carried out by Francis Russell, "His Majesty's Surveyor for the South part of the Duchy" (of Lancaster). As a reward for his good work, Russell was allowed to purchase 152 acres of land between Beech Hill and Cockfoster Road, Beech Hill Park, where he built Russell Mansion (later renamed Beech Hill Park Mansion – see image to the right below). After several ownership changes the estate was acquired by Charles Jack, a local farmer, in 1854. In the 1880s Jack negotiated the establishment of a railway station (which introduced the name "Hadley Wood") with Great Northern Railway, and arranged for the Duchy of Lancaster to convert the leases around that into building leases. Charles Jack died in 1896 but the development continued, and by 1901 over 60 dwellings had been constructed; however, the estate started to sell some of its interests. Jack's freehold property, Beech Hill Park Mansion, became dilapidated and the site was sold off in the early 1920s, becoming Hadley Wood Golf Club.

Hadley Wood sits just east of the village of Monken Hadley (which is now a suburb of Barnet), with the two settlements sharing several features of social life. However, in modern history the two communities are distinct and separate, belonging to different parishes (both civil and ecclesiastical) which in turn belong to different civil Boroughs and ecclesiastical Deaneries.

Hadley Wood has always possessed a strong historical link with the suburb of Cockfosters. In civil administration, Hadley Wood was part of the Municipal Borough of Enfield since its foundation in 1850 all the way up until 1965. Hadley Wood became part of the newly created Ward of Hadley Wood and Cockfosters in 1909 to allow for the return of local councillors. In 1965, the Municipal Borough was abolished, and the London Borough of Enfield formed. The ward of Hadley Wood and Cockfosters, whilst covering the same geographical area, is now known simply as the ward of Cockfosters.

In ecclesiastical administration, Hadley Wood remains part of the parish of Cockfosters and the Deanery of Enfield. However, in 1911 a small local church (technically a 'proprietary chapel') dedicated to St Paul was opened on Camlet Way, Hadley Wood. Although it has not achieved the status of a parish church, it now operates independently of Cockfosters parish church with its own staff and administration.

The large, four-platform railway station at Hadley Wood seems somewhat out of proportion to the size of the community; local folklore suggests that the station was enlarged at the behest of local resident Sir Nigel Gresley, the Chief Mechanical Engineer of the London and North Eastern Railway who lived in Hadley Wood during the 1920s and 1930s before moving away to near St Albans. In reality, the enlargement from 2 to 4 platforms took place in 1959 during the widening of the East Coast Main Line (ECML), long after Gresley died in 1941.

Although the number of dwellings has increased significantly over time, to almost 1,000 currently (with a growing number of high-spec apartments), Hadley Wood remains characterised by green and open spaces, with Green Belt farmland and mature woodlands surrounding the built-up area.

Public transport access is limited and relies largely on the north–south railway link that runs from Welwyn Garden City into London Kings Cross and Moorgate. The nearest Underground stations are Cockfosters and High Barnet. Hadley Wood therefore remains car-dependent, with junction 24 of the M25 located a mile away.

Local shopping is limited to a parade of shops that includes a convenience store. Recreational facilities comprise the Hadley Wood Golf Course, designed by Dr Alister MacKenzie (known mostly for the Augusta National course), and seven tennis courts adjacent to the Hadley Wood Association Centre.

== Education ==
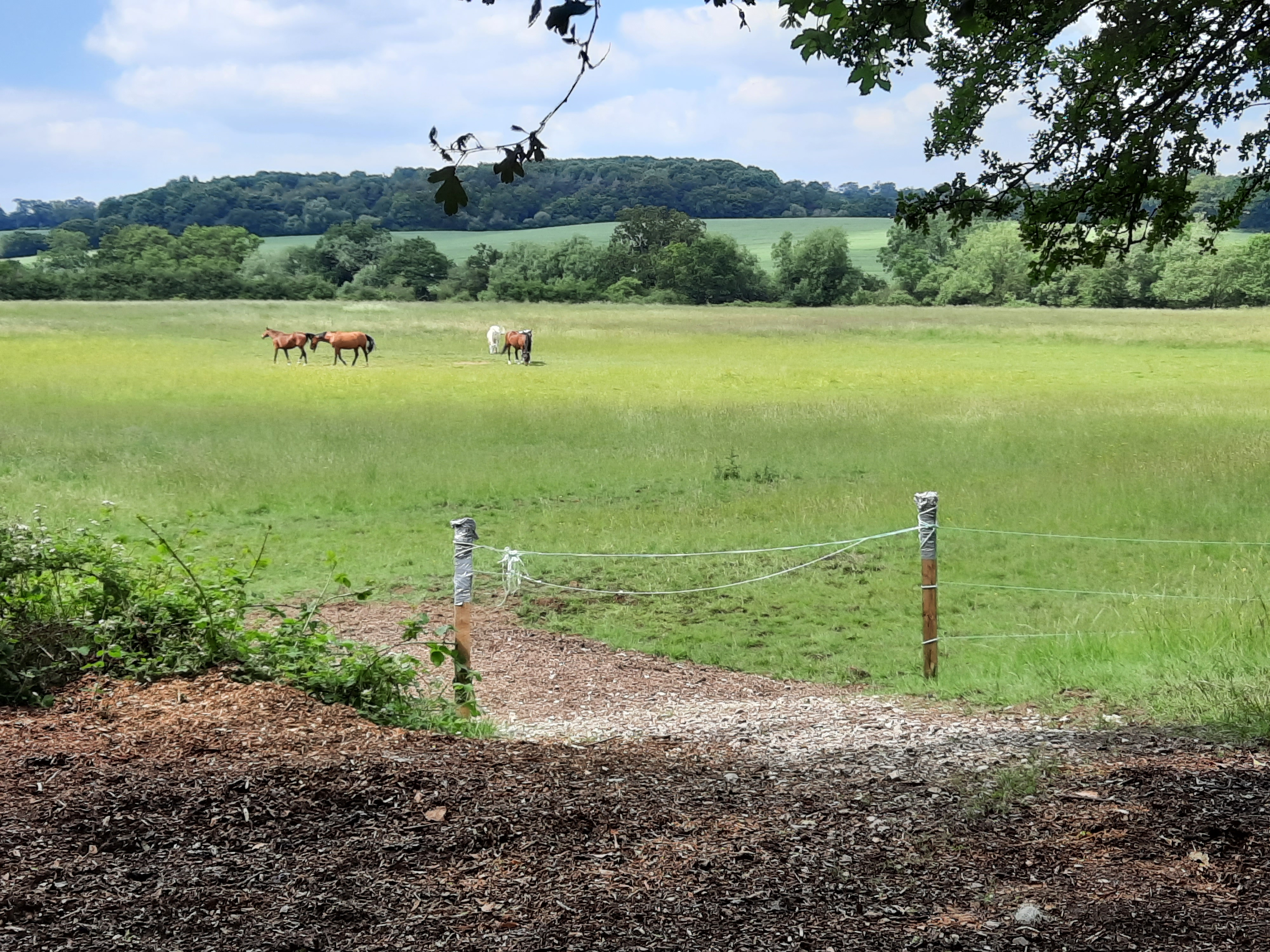
Hadley Wood is surrounded by Green Belt land

- Hadley Wood School is a primary school administered by the London Borough of Enfield.
- There is a Church of England Primary School in the neighbouring community of Monken Hadley, administered by the London Borough of Barnet.
- A private co-educational secondary school, Mount House School, takes students from the ages of 11-18 and is located in nearby Monken Hadley.

== Transport ==
- Hadley Wood railway station is at the junction of Crescent East and Crescent West in the centre of Hadley Wood. It is operated by Great Northern.
- There is no Underground station in Hadley Wood. The closest are Cockfosters (Piccadilly line) and High Barnet (Northern line).
- London Buses routes 298 and 399 serve Hadley Wood.

== See also ==
- Beech Hill Park, a grade II listed building off Beech Hill, that is today used as the club house of Hadley Wood Golf Club.
- Charles Jack, farmer and landowner who was primarily responsible for the construction of Hadley Wood.
- Albert Kingwell, long-serving estate manager at Hadley Wood.
