= Hadley Wood railway station =

Railway station in the London Borough of Enfield, England

Hadley Wood
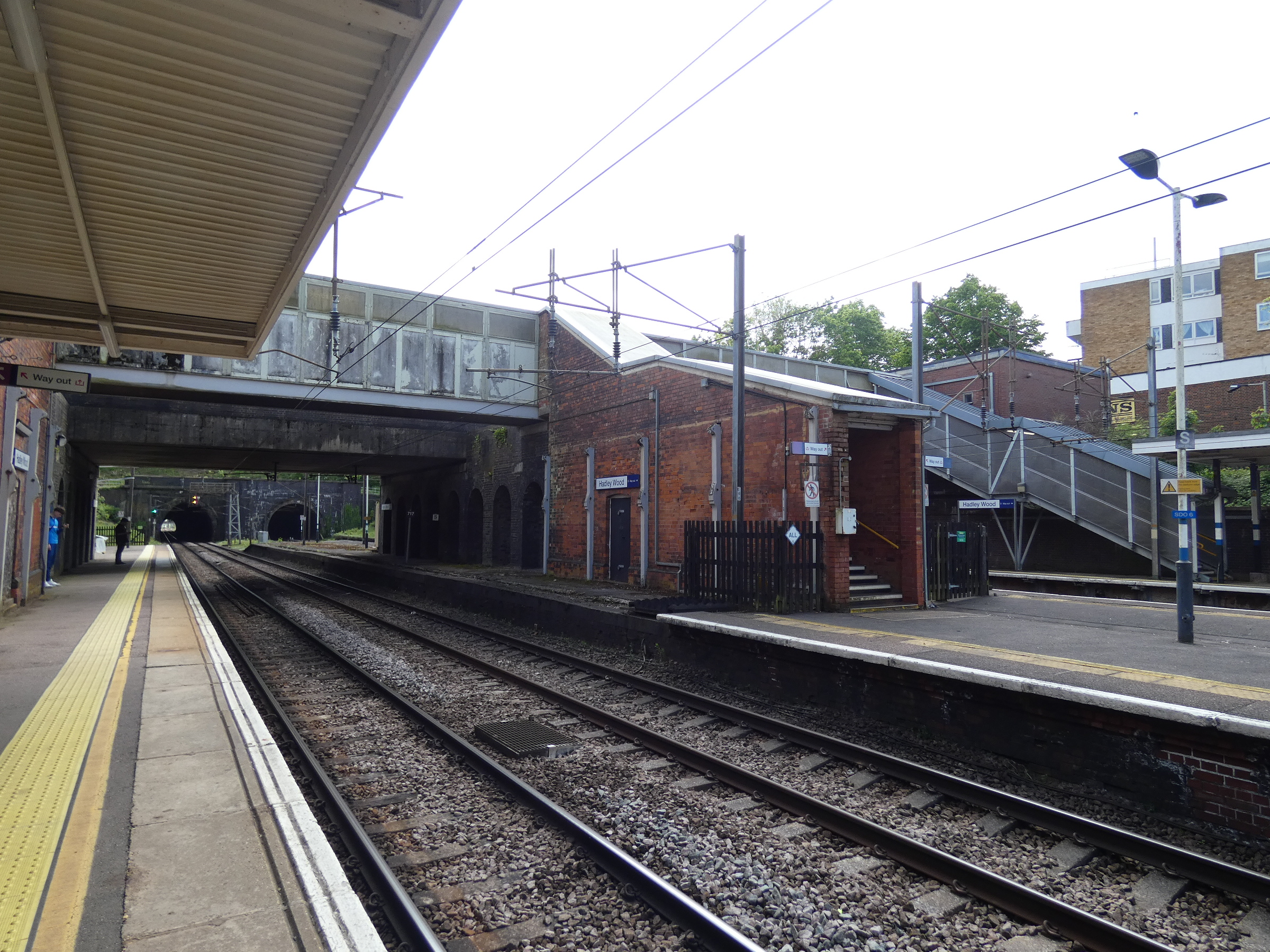
- Hadley Wood Station pictured in May 2024
- Interactive map of Hadley Wood

General information
- Location: Hadley Wood
- Local authority: London Borough of Enfield
- Managed by: Great Northern
- Station code: HDW
- DfT category: E
- Number of platforms: 4
- Fare zone: 6

National Rail annual entry and exit
- 2020–21: ▼84,088
- 2021–22: ▲0.226 million
- 2022–23: ▲0.296 million
- 2023–24: ▲0.325 million
- 2024–25: ▲0.362 million

Key dates
- 1 May 1885: Station opened

Other information
- External links: Departures; Facilities
- Coordinates: 51.6688°N 0.1761°W

Hadley Wood railway station is in the London Borough of Enfield in north London, England. It is 10 miles 46 chains (17.0 km) down the line from London King's Cross, in London fare zone 6, and serves the suburb of Hadley Wood; it is managed and served by Great Northern.

Although the station has four platforms, only two are in everyday use with the central island platforms now closed off to the public. Fast services use the central tracks and do not stop at the station.

== History ==
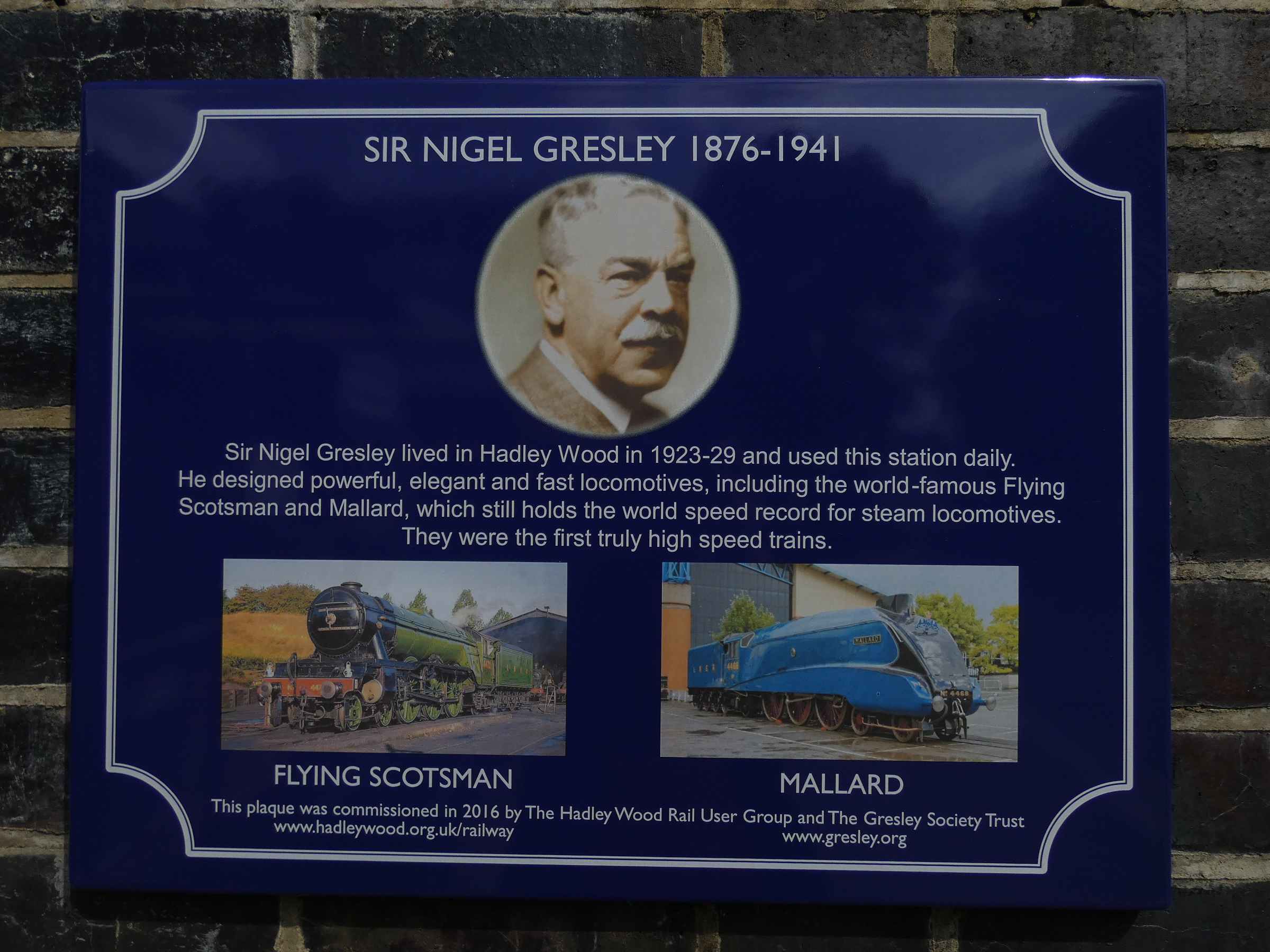
The plaque celebrating Sir Nigel Gresley as a former Hadley Wood resident

The station was opened on 1 May 1885 by the Great Northern Railway (GNR). The station was completely reconstructed in 1959 for the increase from two to four tracks through the station.

To celebrate the fact that legendary locomotive designer Nigel Gresley lived in Hadley Wood from 1923–29, Hadley Wood Rail User Group and The Gresley Society Trust funded a decorative plaque to adorn the station forecourt. This was officially unveiled by former local MP Michael Portillo in 2017.

== Facilities ==
There is a Shere self-service ticket machine at the station entrance, installed in Autumn 2008 and replacing the previous (Avantix) machine.

Oyster cards can be used at this station.

== Services ==
All services at Hadley Wood are operated by Great Northern using Class 717 EMUs.

The typical off-peak service in trains per hour is:

- 2 tph to Moorgate
- 2 tph to Welwyn Garden City

Additional services call at the station during the peak hours.

Preceding station	National Rail	Following station
New Barnet	Great Northern: Great Northern Route; Stopping Services	Potters Bar

== Connections ==
London Buses route 399 serves the station.
