= Alister MacKenzie =

Scottish golf course architect (1870–1934)

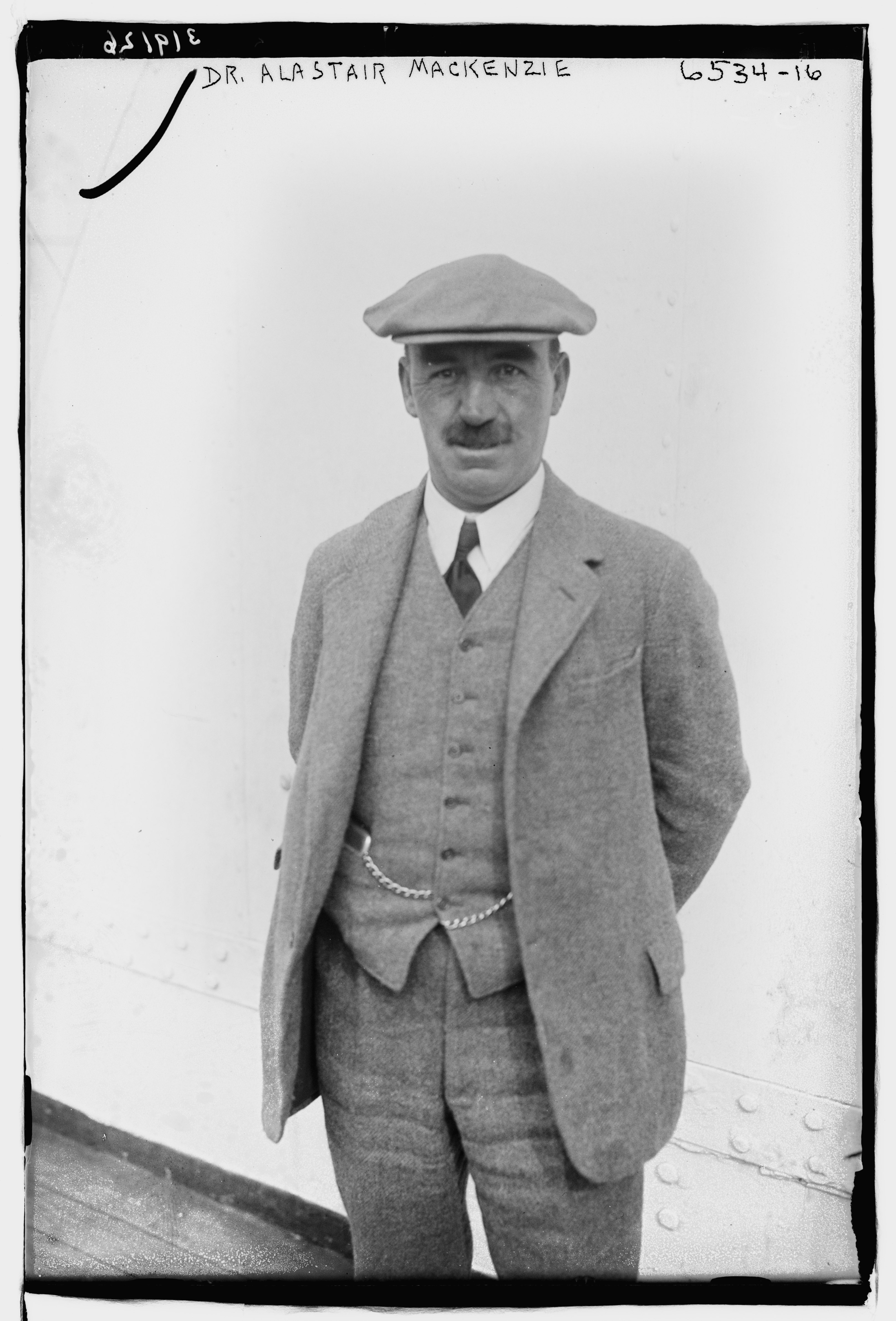
- Dr. Alister MacKenzie
- Born: 30 August 1870; Normanton, Yorkshire, England
- Died: 6 January 1934 (aged 63)
- Education: Cambridge University
- Occupation: Architect
- Design: Augusta National Golf Club; Cypress Point Club; Royal Melbourne Golf Club

Alister MacKenzie (30 August 1870 – 6 January 1934) was an English golf course architect whose course designs span four continents. Originally trained as a surgeon, MacKenzie served as a civilian physician with the British Army during the Boer War where he first became aware of the principles of camouflage. During the First World War, MacKenzie made his own significant contributions to military camouflage, which he saw as closely related to golf course design.

MacKenzie is amongst the most famous golf architects in history. He is a member of the World Golf Hall of Fame and designed more than 50 golf courses, including three that remain in Golf Digest's 2022 Top 10 golf courses in the world: Augusta National Golf Club and Cypress Point Club in the US, and Royal Melbourne Golf Club (West Course) in Australia.

== Early life and education ==
MacKenzie was born on 30 August 1870 in Normanton, near Leeds in Yorkshire, England, to parents of Scottish extraction. His mother, Mary Jane Smith MacKenzie, had family roots in Glasgow. His father, William Scobie MacKenzie, a medical doctor, had been born and raised in the Scottish Highlands near Lochinver. Although christened after his paternal grandfather Alexander, he was called "Alister" (Gaelic for Alexander) from birth. As a youth, MacKenzie and his family spent summers near Lochinver, on what had been traditional Clan MacKenzie lands from 1670 to 1745. MacKenzie's strong identification with his Scottish roots featured prominently in many aspects of his later life.

MacKenzie attended Queen Elizabeth Grammar School, Wakefield, before going up to Gonville and Caius College, Cambridge, where he initially trained as a medical doctor, graduating from Cambridge University in 1891 with a B.A. (Natural Science Tripos Part 1), with honours, third class, before the next year undertaking and passing a second MB (Bachelor of Medicine. Latin: Medicinae Baccalaureus) in Anatomy. After a period working in Leeds, he returned to Cambridge in 1895 where he undertook the third MB examination (Part 1) before passing the London Licentiate examinations for Royal College of Surgeons the same year. Finally, in 1897 he graduated from Cambridge with MB BacS (Bachelor of Surgery) and MA degrees.

== Wartime service ==
MacKenzie served as a surgeon with the Somerset Regiment in South Africa during the Second Boer War.

During his wartime service, MacKenzie became interested in camouflage, which was effectively used by the Boers. As a result, during the First World War, when he once again served in the army, he worked not as a surgeon but as a camoufleur. In a lecture he gave on the subject, he said that "the brilliant successes of the Boers (during his service in South Africa) were due to great extent to their making the best use of natural cover and the construction of artificial cover indistinguishable from nature."

== Golf course design ==
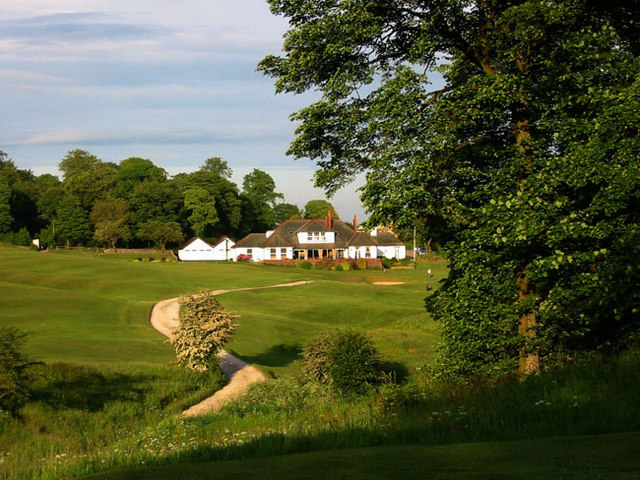
View from the 18th tee of a course designed by MacKenzie at the Cavendish Golf Club, Derbyshire, England

MacKenzie had been a member of several golf clubs near Leeds, dating as far back as the late 1890s. These included Ilkley between 1890 and 1900 and Leeds Golf Club from 1900 to 1910. In 1907, he was one of the founding members of Alwoodley Golf Club, where he was both honorary secretary (1907–1909) and club captain (1912–1913), and he remained on its green committee until 1930. As the course was MacKenzie's original design when Alwoodley was laid out, it was his first opportunity to put many of his design theories to practical test. However, the committee at the time thought that some of his ideas were too expansive, so it called in Harry Colt for a second opinion. Colt was one of the leading golf course architects of the time and was also the secretary of Sunningdale Golf Club.

Colt visited on two occasions only: first on 31 July 1907, when he met MacKenzie for the first time, and later on 6 October 1909. On the first occasion, four months after the course opened for play, having stayed at MacKenzie's house overnight, he realized that MacKenzie's ideas were very much an extension of his own, and he gave great support for MacKenzie's ideas at the meeting with the committee. He did, however, mention the bunkering as MacKenzie's ideas had taken into account the new technology of the day, which was the Haskell wound ball (which bounced and rolled) and was now being used instead of the old gutta-percha golf ball. Some of MacKenzie's modern ideas under discussion included undulating greens, long and narrow greens angled from the center of the fairway, fairly large and free-form bunker shapes, and substantial additional contouring. All of these remained part of his "signature style" throughout his career.

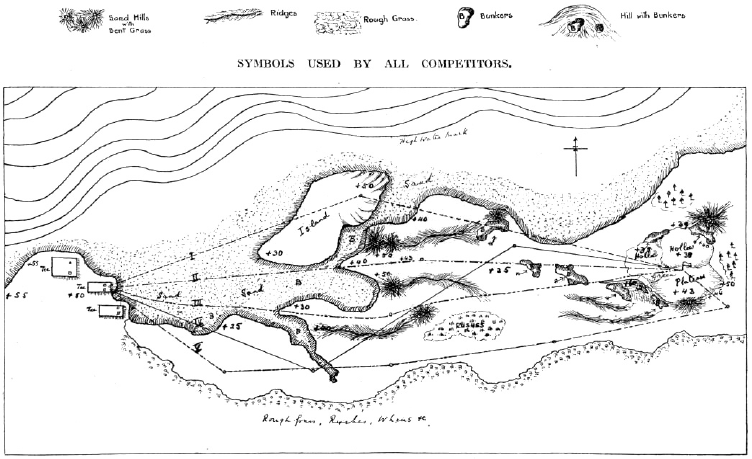
MacKenzie's winning design in Country Life's 1914 golf architecture competition

In 1914, MacKenzie won a golf hole design competition organized by Country Life; the adjudicators were Bernard Darwin, Horace Hutchinson, and Herbert Fowler. The sponsor was architect Charles Blair Macdonald. The Lido Prize served to find fresh ideas for the design of a course on Long Island, N.Y. called the Lido Golf Club.

MacKenzie then took an active interest in course improvements at his own clubs, gaining experience in the newly emerging discipline of golf course design. He charted the Old Course at St. Andrews in great detail; by 1915 he had become a member of the R&A. In March 1924, he produced a map which remains well-known to the present day.

Following the First World War, MacKenzie left medicine and began to work instead as a golf course designer in the United Kingdom, in association with Harry Colt and Charles Alison in 1919, with whom he formed the London firm of Colt, MacKenzie & Alison. Four years later, MacKenzie went his own way.

MacKenzie thought he had learned a lot about golf course planning from having designed camouflage. There are references to the latter in his first book on course design, called Golf Architecture (MacKenzie 1920), such as when he writes that "there is an extraordinary resemblance between what is now known as the camouflage of military earthworks and golf-course construction", or later, when he states that there "are many other attributes in common between the successful golf architect and the camoufleur. Both, if not actually artists, must have an artistic temperament, and have had an education in science." In the same book, he also writes that "the chief object of every golf course architect worth his salt is to imitate the beauties of nature [and presumably also the hazards] so closely as to make his work indistinguishable from nature itself." Golf Architecture featured 13 Principles, which are considered to be a timeless statement of what all golf courses should be. His book was later included in Herbert Warren Wind's Classics of Golf Library.

MacKenzie worked in an era before large scale earth moving became a major factor in golf course construction, and his designs are notable for their sensitivity to the nature of the original site.

MacKenzie's second book was The Spirit of St. Andrews. He shared his views on golf course design and sang the praises of the Old Course and other courses he admired. MacKenzie offered insights on the game and the ethos of working with the land to design strategic holes that provide "pleasurable excitement." It was written and compiled in 1933 with the help of his stepson, Tony Haddock. Champion golfer Bobby Jones wrote the foreword to the book, which was not published during either of their lifetimes. It was thought to be lost. In 1992, golf architecture expert Ron Whitten told a small gathering at Pasatiempo about the lost manuscript. The gathering consisted of members of some courses designed by MacKenzie in the early stages of forming a Society. This initiated a search not only for the manuscript, but plans, photos, and other documentation that may be at the clubs. Tony Haddock had left many papers to his son, Raymond Haddock. Therein, the son discovered the unpublished manuscript by his step-grandfather. Haddock was able to have it edited and published by 1995, just in time for the Open Championship at St. Andrews. Haddock was involved in many book-signing events. Proceeds from book sales were donated to the Alister MacKenzie Society to establish a fund to encourage the most promising golf course architects in the world to follow MacKenzie's 13 Principles through a competition. The inaugural year of Ray Haddock Lido Prize was 1998, and the first judges were Arnold Palmer and Ed Seay. The rules of the competition were similar to the 1914 Lido Prize competition in Country Life.

=== Course chronology ===
- 1907 – Alwoodley Golf Club, Leeds, England
- 1909 – Moortown Golf Club, Leeds, England
- 1912 – Reddish Vale Golf Course, Stockport, England
- 1912 - Hornsea Golf Club, East Yorkshire, England
- 1913 – Castletown Golf Links, Isle of Man
- 1913 – Dewsbury District Golf Club, West Yorkshire, England
- 1913 – Garforth Golf Club, Leeds, England
- 1913 – Hazel Grove Golf Club, Cheshire, England
- 1913 – Headingley Golf Club, Leeds, England (renovations)
- 1913 – Horsforth Golf Club, Leeds, England (renovations)
- 1913 – Sitwell Park Golf Club, Rotherham, England
- 1914 – Darlington Golf Club, County Durham England (new course)
- 1914 – Oakdale Golf Club, Harrogate, England
- 1914 – Crosland Heath Golf Club, Linthwaite, England
- 1917 – Nelson Golf Club, Nelson, Lancashire England
- 1919 – Sutton Coldfield Golf Club, North Warwickshire, England
- 1920 – Knock Golf Club, Belfast, Ireland
- 1920 – Bury Golf Club, Unsworth, England
- 1920 – Felixstowe Ferry Golf Club, Felixstowe, England
- 1920 – Wetherby Golf Club, Leeds England
- 1920 – Marsden Golf Club, Marsden, England
- 1921 – Cleckheaton & District Golf Club, Bradford, England (new course)
- 1921 – Walsall Golf Club, West Midlands, England
- 1921 – Fulwell Golf Club, England (renovations)
- 1921 – The Portland Course at the Royal Troon Golf Club, Troon, Scotland
- 1921 – Weston-super-Mare Golf Club, Weston-super-Mare, England (redesign)
- 1922 – Hadley Wood Golf Course, Hadley Wood, Hertfordshire
- 1922 – Sand Moor Golf Club, Leeds, Yorkshire, England
- 1922 – Stanmore Golf Club, Middlesex, England
- 1922 – Pitreavie (Dunfermline) Golf Club, Fife, Scotland
- 1922 – Bonnyton Golf Club, Eaglesham, Scotland
- 1922 – Campo de Golf de la Ciudad, Buenos Aires, Argentina
- 1924 – Duff House Royal Golf Club, Aberdeenshire, Scotland
- 1924 – Temple Newsam Golf Club, Leeds, England
- 1924 – Douglas Golf Club, Cork, Ireland
- 1927 – Cork Golf Club, Cork, Ireland
- 1924 – Muskerry Golf Club, Cork, Ireland
- 1924 – Bolton Old Links Golf Club, Bolton, Lancashire
- 1924 – Teignmouth Golf Club, Devon, England
- 1925 – Seaton Carew Golf Club Course, Seaton Carew, Durham County, England
- 1925 – Stanley Park Golf Course, Stanley Park, Blackpool, England
- 1925 – South Moor golf club (course re-design)
- 1925 – Ravensworth Golf Club, Gateshead, England (re-design)
- 1925 – Galway Golf Club, Galway, Ireland.
- 1925 – Low Laithes Golf Club, Wakefield, Yorkshire, England
- 1925 – Cavendish Golf Club, Buxton, Derbyshire, England
- 1925 – Willingdon Golf Club, Eastbourne, England
- 1925 – Rhayader Golf Club, Cwmdauddwr, Radnorshire (now Powys), Wales
- 1925 – Faversham Golf Club, Kent England – redesign
- 1926 – Titirangi Golf Club, Titirangi, Auckland, New Zealand
- 1926 – Royal Adelaide Golf Club, Adelaide, Australia
- 1926 – The Worcestershire Golf Club, Malvern, Worcestershire, England
- 1926 – The Flinders Golf Club, Flinders, Victoria, Australia (consultant on existing design)
- 1926 – Royal Melbourne Golf Club, Australia
- 1926 – New South Wales Golf Club, Sydney, Australia
- 1926 – Royal Queensland Golf Club, Brisbane, Australia
- 1927 – Worcester Golf & Country Club, Worcester, England
- 1927 – Hazlehead Park (MacKenzie Championship Course), Aberdeen, Scotland
- 1927 – Limerick Golf Club, Limerick, Ireland
- 1927 – Lahinch Golf Club (Old Course), Ireland
- 1927 – Blairgowrie Golf Club (Rosemount Course), Perth and Kinross, Scotland
- 1927 – Meadow Club, Fairfax, California, USA
- 1927 – Redlands Country Club, Redlands, California, USA
- 1927 – Douglas Golf Course, Pulrose, Isle of Man
- 1928 – The Valley Club of Montecito Santa Barbara, California, USA
- 1928 – Cypress Point Club, Monterey Peninsula, California, USA
- 1928 – Northwood Golf Club, Monte Rio, California, USA
- 1928 – Fray Bentos Golf Club, Fray Bentos, Rio Negro, Uruguay
- 1928 – Libertad Golf Club, Provincia de Buenos Aires, Argentina
- 1929 – Nenagh Golf Club, Co. Tipperary, Ireland
- 1929 – Pasatiempo Golf Club, Santa Cruz, California, USA
- 1929 – Claremont Country Club, Oakland, California, USA
- 1929 – Crystal Downs Country Club, Frankfort, Michigan, USA
- 1930 – Jockey Club (Buenos Aires) de San Isidro, Buenos Aires, Argentina
- 1930 – Club de Golf del Uruguay (Punta Carretas), Montevideo, Uruguay
- 1930 – Green Hills Country Club, Millbrae, California, USA
- 1931 – Bingley St Ives Golf Course, Harden, Bingley, West Yorkshire, England
- 1931 – Ohio State University Golf Club (Scarlet Course) at Ohio State University, Columbus, Ohio, USA
- 1931 – St. Charles Country Club, Winnipeg, Manitoba, Canada; MacKenzie Nine
- 1931 – University of Michigan Golf Course, University of Michigan, Ann Arbor, Michigan, USA
- 1931 – Royal Melbourne Golf Club (West Course), Melbourne, Australia
- 1932 – Sharp Park Golf Course, Pacifica, California, USA
- 1932 – Haggin Oaks Golf Course, Sacramento, California, USA
- 1932 – Pontefract and District Golf Club, West Yorkshire, England which incorporated a number of classic Mackenzie greens
- 1933 – Augusta National Golf Club, Augusta, Georgia, USA

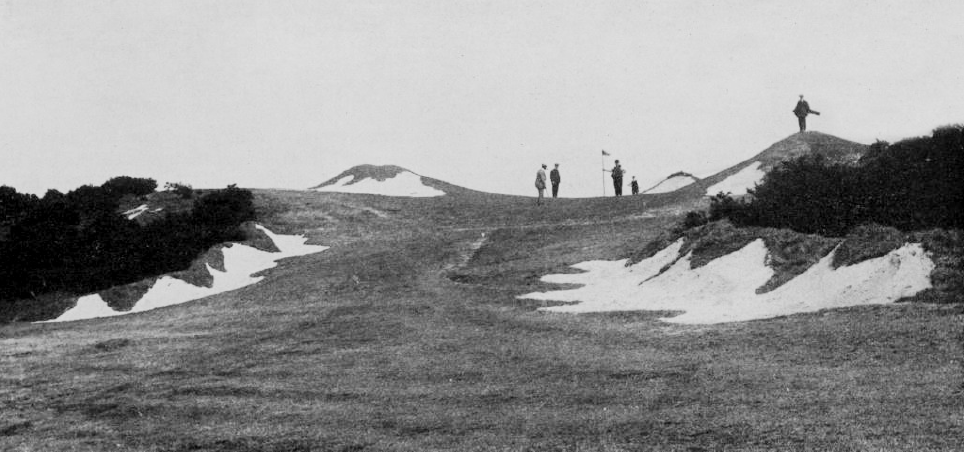
1915 photograph of the 2nd hole of the Headingley Golf Club near Leeds, designed by MacKenzie

== As a golfer ==
As a player, MacKenzie was self-described as a "good putter, but a mediocre ball striker" for most of his life. It was not until after his move to California, when he was already in his 60s, that MacKenzie had what he described as his "golfing epiphany". This was an improvement in his ball striking which enabled him to often score in the high 70s to low 80s for 18 holes. He described this in one of his books as "in the 70s after 60". MacKenzie was one of the first prominent golf course designers who had not been a leading player.

== Legacy ==
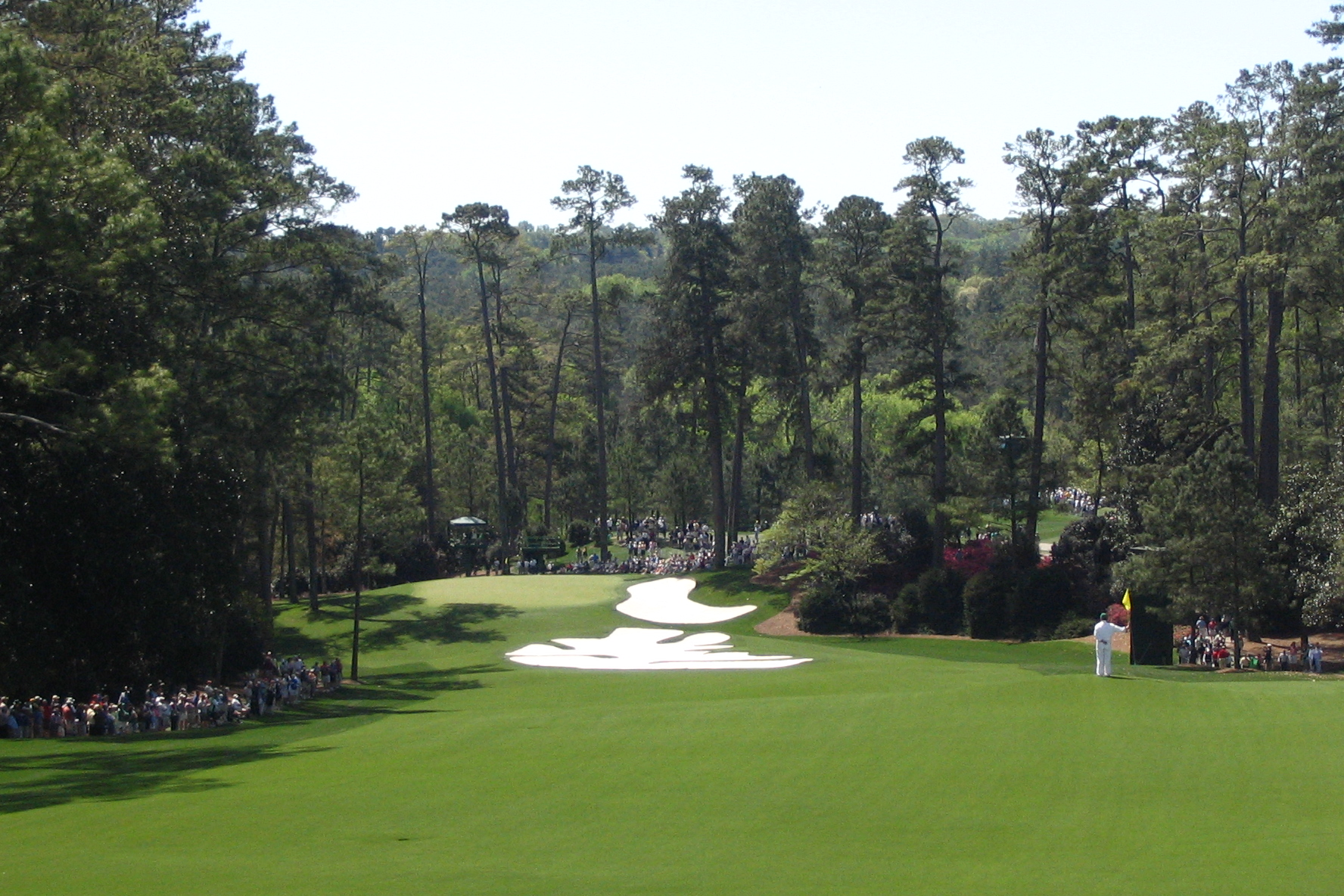
Augusta National Golf Club's hole 10, "Camellia"

In the late 1920s, he moved to the United States, where he carried out some of his most notable work, although he continued to design courses outside that country as well. Today, he is remembered as the designer of some of the world's finest courses, among them Century Country Club (Purchase, New York), as MacKenzie was partners with Colt & Alison at the time the two built Century, from mid-1923 he was working with other partners when he designed Augusta National Golf Club (Augusta, Georgia), Cypress Point Club (Monterey Peninsula, California), Royal Melbourne Golf Club (Melbourne, Australia), Pasatiempo Golf Club (Santa Cruz, California), Crystal Downs Country Club (Frankfort, Michigan), Lahinch Golf Course (Lahinch, Ireland), and Meadow Club (Fairfax, California) [see extended list of his courses above].

MacKenzie died in Santa Cruz, California, in January 1934, two months before the inaugural Masters Tournament (then known as the Augusta National Invitational Tournament).

Discovered sixty years after his death was an unpublished manuscript on golf and golf course design, which was posthumously published in 1995 as The Spirit of St. Andrews (MacKenzie 1995).

== Bibliography ==
- MacKenzie, Alister (1915), "Military Entrenchments" in Golf Illustrated. Vol 3 No 1, pp. 42–45.
- MacKenzie, Alister [unsigned article, but authorship claimed by MacKenzie] (1919), "Entrenchments and Camouflage: Lecture by a British Officer Skilled in Landscape Gardening" in Professional Memoirs, Corps of Engineers, U.S. Army and Engineer Department at Large. No 47, pp. 574–638.
- MacKenzie, Alister (1920), Golf Architecture: Economy in Course Construction and Green-Keeping. London UK: Simpkin, Marshall, Hamilton, Kent and Co. Ltd.
- MacKenzie, Alister (1934), "Common Sense of Camouflage Defence" in The Military Engineer. Vol XXVI No 145 (January–February), pp. 42–44.
- MacKenzie, Alister (1995). The Spirit of St. Andrews. Sleeping Bear Press. ISBN 1-886947-00-7.
