= Francis Russell (solicitor) =

English lawyer, official and author

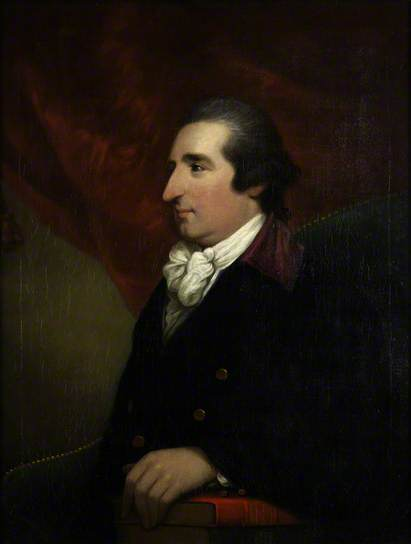
Francis Russell

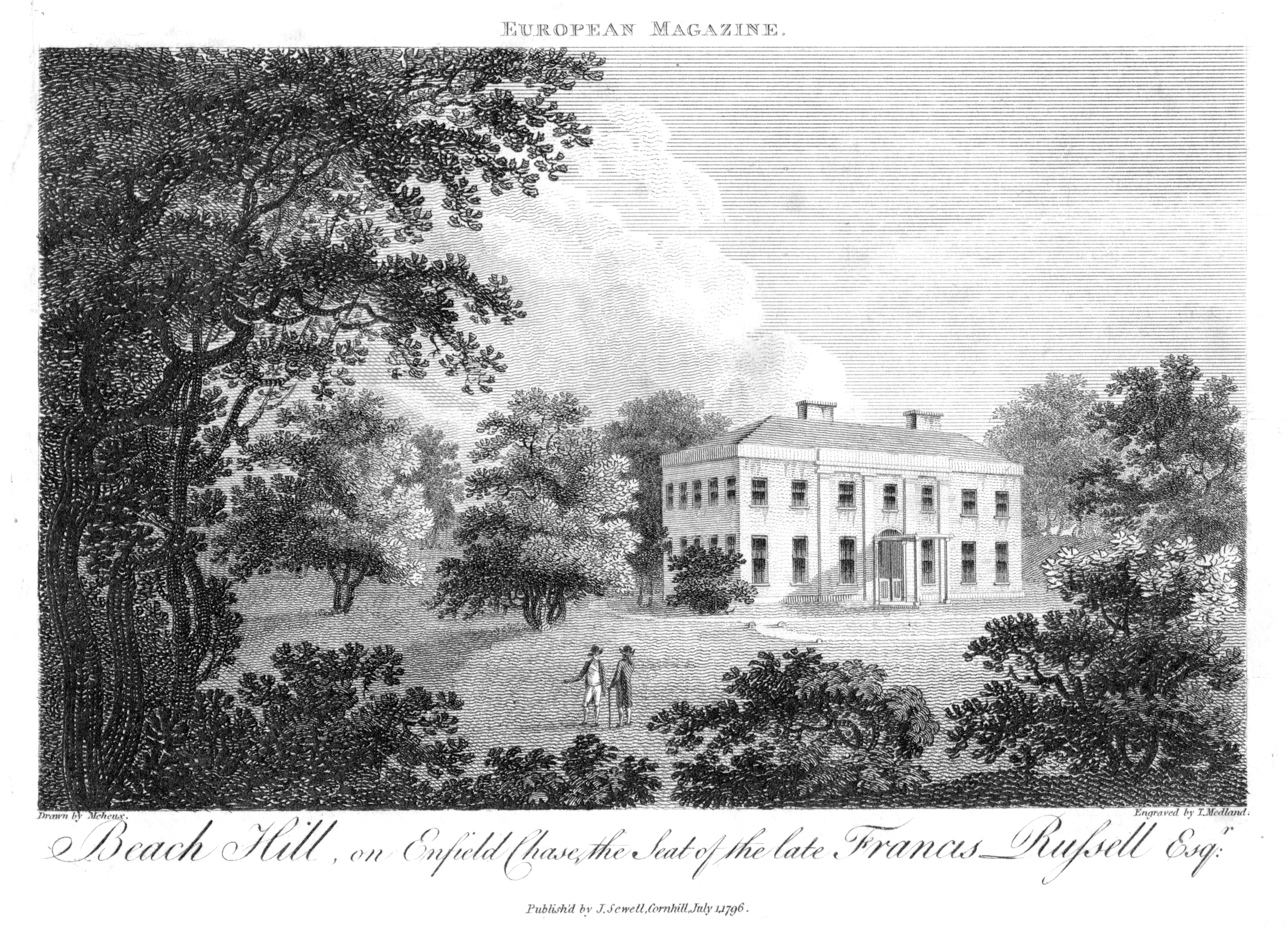
Beech Hill Park, as illustrated in European Magazine, 1 July 1796.

Francis Russell (1740 – 1 September 1795) was an English lawyer, official and author.

== Life ==
Russell was the youngest son of an attorney, town clerk in Basingstoke, Hampshire, and a younger brother of the Rev. Sambro(o)ke Russell, the antiquarian. He was articled to his father, and then practised as a solicitor on his own. Around 1762 James Smith-Stanley, Lord Strange as its Chancellor brought him in to do legal work for the Duchy of Lancaster. Russell strived to put the records in order, and gave up other work. He held the title "His Majesty's Surveyor for the South part of the Duchy" (of Lancaster) when Enfield Chace was broken up in 1777.

As part of the break-up, Russell was allowed to buy the freehold of 152 acres of land bordering on Beech Hill and Cockfosters Road in Hadley Wood. On this land he built Russell Mansion, later known as Beech Hill Park, and now used as the club house for Hadley Wood Golf Club.

Subsequently, Russell was brought in to reorganise affairs of the East India Company, through Thomas Orde Poulet. He was Secretary to the India Board, and a Fellow of the Royal Society and Society of Antiquaries of London.

== Works ==
Russell wrote A Short History of the East India Company (1793), which was published anonymously.
