= Favell Lee Mortimer =

British writer (1802–1878)

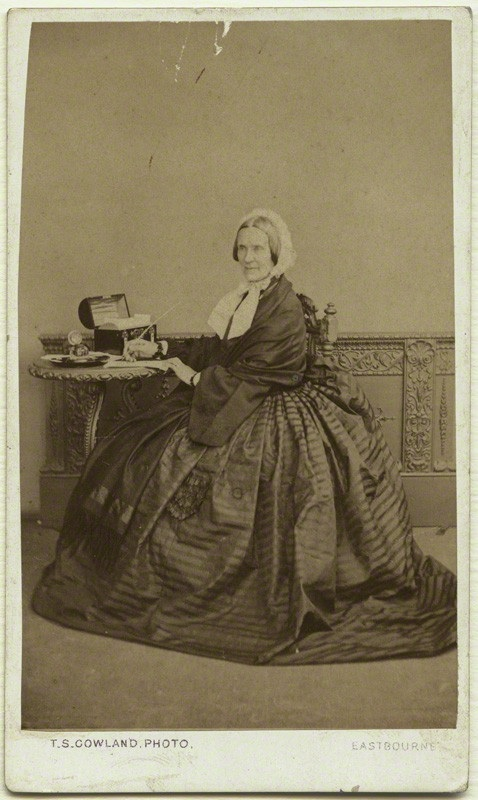
- Born: Favell Lee Bevan; 14 July 1802; London, England
- Died: 22 August 1878 (aged 76)
- Occupation: Author
- Spouse: Thomas Mortimer
- Parent(s): David Bevan; Favell Bourke Lee
- Relatives: Silvanus Bevan (paternal grandfather); Timothy Bevan (paternal great-grandfather); Silvanus Bevan (paternal great-granduncle)

Favell Lee Mortimer (born Favell Lee Bevan; 14 July 1802 – 22 August 1878) was a British Evangelical author of educational books for children.

== Early life ==
Bevan was born on 14 July 1802, at Russell Square in London, England. She was the third of eight children of Favell Bourke Lee (1780–1841) and Barclays bank co-founder David Bevan (1774–1846). When she was six the family moved to Hale End, Walthamstow, where her mother came under the strong evangelical influence of both the Rev. George Collison and the family governess Clara Claire. When Favell was twenty the family moved back to Upper Harley Street in London to enjoy a full social life and her father bought an estate in East Barnet which he named Belmont, East Barnet.

== Career ==
Bevan oversaw the religious education of children on her father's estates, at Fosbury, in Wiltshire and in East Barnet and her interest in educational writing grew from that experience. She developed her own method of teaching children to read based on an early kind of 'flash cards' rather than the traditional hornbook, with her Reading Disentangled (1834), a set of phonics flashcards, being credited by some as the first flashcards. Her teaching notes were collected and appeared as such works as Peep of Day and Reading Without Tears. According to Todd Pruzan, "For the better part of the 19th century, Mortimer was something of a literary superstar to an impressionable audience, both in her native England and beyond." The Peep of Day series was immensely popular: over 500,000 copies of the original edition were issued; it went through numerous English editions; and it was published by the Religious Tract Society in thirty-seven different dialects and languages. Writing in The New Yorker on 4 March 1950, Mortimer's grandniece Rosalind Constable called the book, "one of the most outspokenly sadistic children's books ever written" referring to her great aunt's belief in the need to impress upon children the pains of hell that would result from wrongdoing and the rejection of salvation.

Like many women writers, her books initially appeared anonymously, as "By the Author of 'The Peep of Day.'" Her focus on introductions to other countries and cultures was perhaps ironic, given that she herself rarely travelled outside of her native England. Her way of simplifying religious ideas for very small children was criticised by some contemporaries, and to readers now her piety is unpalatable or amusing and her descriptions of other cultures are marred by unpleasant stereotypes; however, to the student of nineteenth-century children's literature, her texts are instructive. She wrote a Latin textbook for beginners, "Latin Without Tears".

== Personal life ==
In 1831, Favell Lee Bevan became friends with Henry Manning, who was a friend of her brother Robert from their time at Harrow School. Manning was six years her junior and initially they shared an intense interest in religious questions. Any suggestion of a romance was brought to an end by her mother in May 1832 and Favell broke off their correspondence which was only reopened in 1847 after the death of her father. Manning then wrote offering condolences and asking for the return of all his letters to her and offering hers in exchange. According to Audrey Gamble in her history of the Bevan family, his biographer regarded Favell Mortimer as one of the three most important women influencing Manning's life.

In 1841, at age 39, she married the Reverend Thomas Mortimer, a popular preacher and minister of the Episcopal Chapel, Gray's Inn Lane, London. Thomas Mortimer was a widower with two young daughters, the elder of whom died young and the other suffered from severe depression necessitating long periods away from her family, much to Favell's distress. Her niece and biographer painted the marriage as a happy one ending with his death in 1850. However, her nephew Edwyn Bevan commemorating the centenary of the publication of Peep of Day suggested that Thomas Mortimer had a violent temper and was sometimes cruel to her. Although the marriage was childless they adopted a young student for the Church of England ministry called Lethbridge Moore as their son in about 1848. He later became Vicar of Sheringham in Norfolk and after the death of her husband Mrs Mortimer moved first to Hendon and then to Norfolk where she cared for several charity orphans whom she saw educated and started in employment. She travelled extensively visiting friends and relations and eventually suffered from a series of strokes, becoming increasingly frail and died at West Runton on 22 August 1878, aged 76. She was buried in Upper Sheringham churchyard.

== Response ==
Modern response points out the "venomous-toned" author's unabashed and almost all-encompassing racism. The Countries of Europe Described is "One of the most outspokenly sadistic children's book ever written", and it "seems designed to terrify children from leaving England, but I don't understand why." The broadcaster was referring to Modern book The Clumsiest People in Europe, the introduction of which states "...passage's escalating scorn and rudeness actually startled me, with its absolutist damnation of silly women and smoking and novels, certified by a publisher's commitment to type and paper and an ornate clothbound cover."

== Works ==
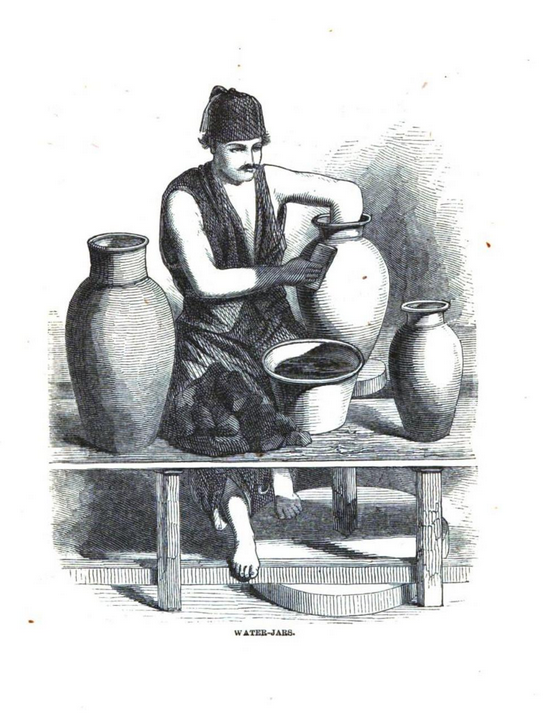
More about Jesus (1839)

- The peep of day, or, A series of the earliest religious instruction the infant mind is capable of receiving (1833)
- Line upon Line (1837)
- More about Jesus (1839)
- Near Home, or, The Countries of Europe Described (1849)
- Far Off (1849)
- Asia and Australia Described (1849)
- Far Off, Part II (1852)
- Africa and America Described (1854)
- Reading without Tears (1857)
- Latin without Tears (1877)
- Precept Upon Precept (1878)

== Resources ==
- Bevan, Edwyn, "Peep of Day A Lawgiver in the Nursery, The Long Reign of Miss Bevan", The Times, London, 27 June 1933.
- Boase, F. Modern English Biography. 1892–1921.
- Constable, Rosalind. Department of Amplification, The New Yorker, 4 March 1950.
- Gamble, Audrey, A History of the Bevan Family, Headley Brothers, London, 1923.
- Kirk, J. F. A Supplement to Allibone's critical dictionary of English literature. 1891.
- Meyer, Mrs (Louisa), The Author of the Peep of Day Being the Life Story of Mrs Mortimer by her niece Mrs Meyer. The Religious Tract Society, London, 1901.
- Mitchell, Rosemary. Favell Lee (1802–1878)." Oxford Dictionary of National Biography. Ed. H. C. G. Matthew and Brian Harrison. Oxford: OUP, 2004. 2 April 2007.
- Pruzan, Todd; Mortimer, Favell Lee, The Clumsiest People in Europe: Or, Mrs. Mortimer's Bad-Tempered Guide to the Victorian World. Bloomsbury, London, 2005.
- Ward, T. H. Men of the reign... of Queen Victoria. 1885.
- Eastwood, Christina, Not Without Tears, John Ritchie, Kilmarnock, 2018
- Ross, Greg (22 February 2015). "Podcast Episode 47: The Scariest Travel Books Ever Written". Futility Closet.
