= Richard Bevan =

Richard Bevan may refer to:

- Richard Bevan (banker, born 1788) (1788–1870), British banker and philanthropist
- Richard Alexander Bevan (1834–1918), his son, British banker and philanthropist
- Richard Bevan (Royal Navy officer) (1885–1976), British Royal Navy officer
- G. Richard Bevan (born 1959), American attorney and judge
