= David Bevan (banker) =

British banker (1774–1846)

- Born: Nov 6 1774; Bishopsgate, London, England
- Died: Dec 24 1846
- Resting place: Christ Church, Cockfosters
- Education: Winchester College
- Occupation: Banker
- Spouse: Favell Bourke Lee
- Children: 7, including Robert Cooper Lee Bevan and Favell Lee Mortimer
- Parent(s): Silvanus Bevan; Louisa Kendall
- Relatives: Timothy Bevan (paternal grandfather); Silvanus Bevan (paternal great-grandfather); Richard Bevan (brother)

David Bevan (6 November 1774 – 24 December 1846) was a British banker. He was a partner in Barclay, Bevan & Co, later known as Barclays.

== Early life ==
He was born in Bishopsgate, London, and educated at Winchester College. He was one of seven sons of Silvanus Bevan and Louisa Kendall.

== Career ==
He was a partner in the London bank of Barclay, Bevan & Co (which would become Barclays). He had a seizure in 1826 and retired from the bank.

== Personal life ==
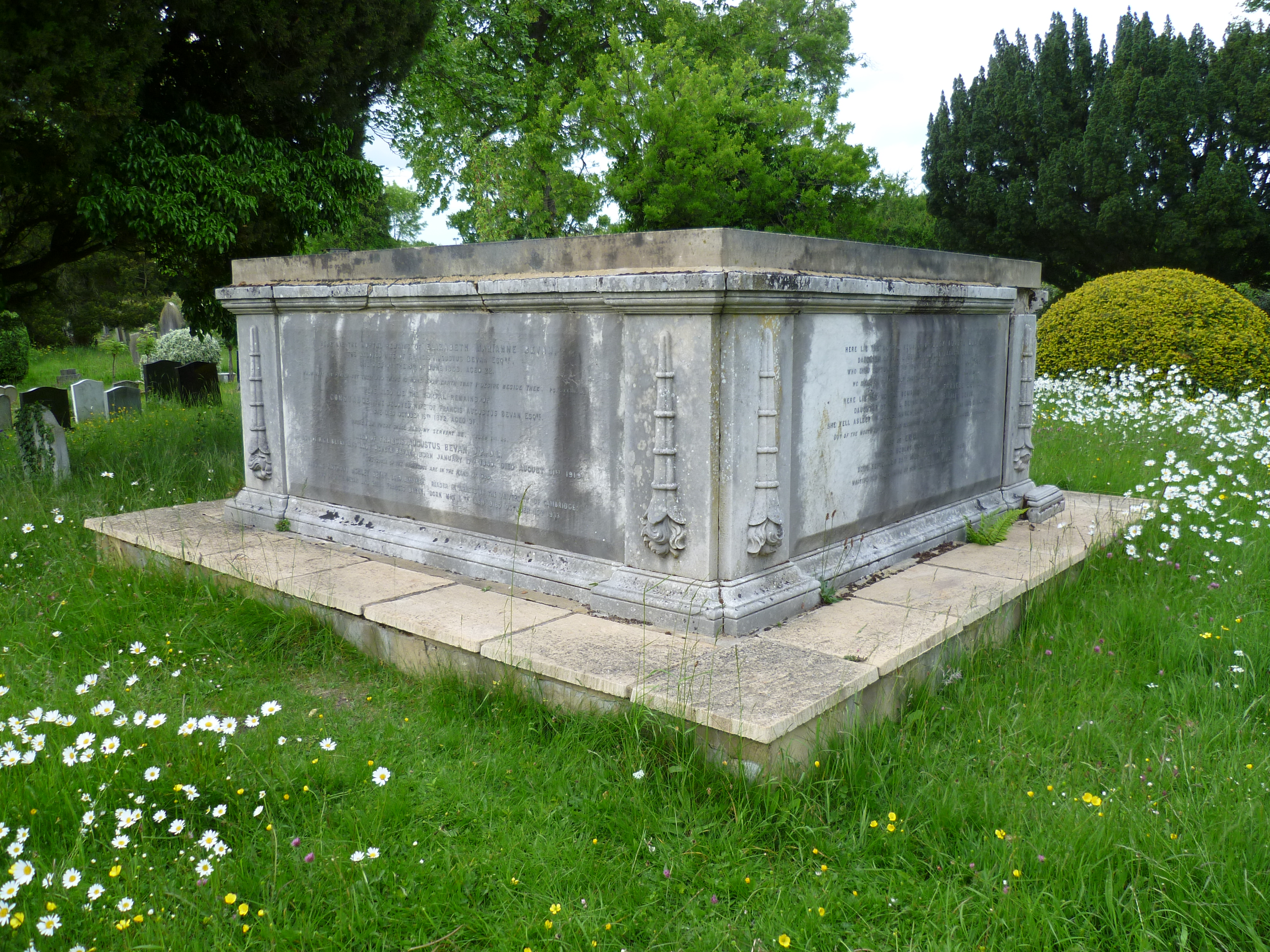
The Bevan family vault at Christ Church, Cockfosters

On 7 May 1798, he married Favell Bourke Lee (1780-1841), the daughter and heiress of Robert Cooper Lee (1735-1794), and Priscilla Kelly, daughter of Denis Kelly, Chief Justice of Jamaica. Robert Cooper Lee was Crown Solicitor-General of Jamaica, and Barrister of 26 Berners Street and 30 Bedford Square, London (also of Rose Hall, Montego Bay, Jamaica. The Bevan couple spent their honeymoon at his father's house Riddlesworth Hall.

In 1808 they moved to Hale End, Walthamstow, and this was sold in about 1822, when they moved to 42 Upper Harley Street. In 1826, he bought Belmont, in East Barnet, from Job Raikes, which passed to his son Robert on his death. He later bought Trent Park for his eldest son Robert.

They had seven children.

- Louisa Priscilla Bevan (21 December 1800 - 11 April 1883), married Augustus Henry Bosanquet (1792-1877) At Marylebone Church on 20 June 1825.
- Favell Lee Bevan (14 July 1802 - 22 August 1878), married Rev. Thomas Mortimer (1795-1850) on 29 April 1841, and became an Evangelical author of educational books for children.
- Robert Cooper Lee Bevan (1809-1890) became a fellow banker, senior partner of Barclays Bank.
- Richard Lee Bevan (15 May 1811 - 12 February 1900), married Isabella Judith Maria Loraine Smith (1820-1885) on 10 September 1840.
- Rev. (David) Barclay Bevan (9 March 1813 - 31 January 1898), married Agnes Carus-Wilson (1818-1855).
- Frances Lee Bevan (5 April 1819 - 20 March 1903), married Admiral William Morier (1790-1864) on 13 July 1841.
- Frederica Emma Bevan (24 November 1803 - 23 September 1886), married Ernest Augustus Stephenson (1803-1855) on 1 February 1834.

== Death ==
Bevan died on 24 December 1846 at Belmont as a consequence of injuries sustained during a fire there the previous week. He was buried alongside his wife in the Bevan family vault at Christ Church, Cockfosters.
