= Joseph Gurney Bevan =

English writer (1753–1814)

- Born: 18 February 1753; London, England
- Died: 12 September 1814 (aged 61)
- Resting place: Bunhill Fields
- Parent(s): Timothy Bevan; Hannah Bevan
- Relatives: Silvanus Bevan (1661–1725) (paternal grandfather); Silvanus Bevan (1691–1765) (uncle)

Joseph Gurney Bevan (1753–1814) was a British Quaker, known as a writer of apologetics.

== Life ==
The son of Timothy and Hannah Bevan, he was born in London on 18 February 1753. His father hired the English educator, historian, and Quaker Robert Proud to tutor him and his brother. His father gave him a share in his business of a chemist and druggist in Plough Court, Lombard Street. In 1784 his mother died. He retired from trade in 1794 with a loss of capital, having refused, from conscientious reasons, to supply armed vessels with drugs.

He filled for many years the station of a Quaker elder. In 1796 he moved to Stoke Newington. On a visit to friends in Scotland, in 1808, Bevan began to suffer from cataract in his left eye, and two years later he was attacked by paralysis in his left side. His wife became unable to recognise her own husband. She died in 1813. Bevan at the end of his life had read to him selections from John Kendall's Collection of Letters, Thomas Ellwood's Journal, and Mary Waring's Diary; and spent most of his time in Tottenham with family connections.

On 12 September 1814 Bevan died, and was buried at the Quaker Burying Ground, Bunhill Fields.

== Reputation ==
William Thomas Lowndes said that Bevan was the ablest of the Quaker apologists. William Orme found the Life of Paul insightful by the way of explanation of Quaker theology; and Thomas Hartwell Horne admired the geographical notes.

== Works ==
It was in 1794 that Bevan began writing verse for an almanac published by James Phillips. He wrote biographical material on the Quaker figures Robert Barclay, James Nayler, Isaac Penington, and Sarah Stephenson. His major works are:

- A Refutation of some of the more modern Misrepresentations of the Society of Friends, commonly called Quakers, with a life of James Nayler; also a Summary of the History, Doctrine, and Discipline of Friends, 1800. This work addressed the writings of Mosheim, Formey, David Hume, and the editors of the Encyclopædia Britannica, who quoted from Charles Leslie and John Wesley.
- An Examination of the First Part of a Pamphlet, called An Appeal to the Society of Friends, 1802. A reply to Thomas Foster, its intention was to show that early Quakers were not Unitarians.
- A Short Account of the Life and Writings of Robert Barclay, 1802.
- Thoughts on Reason and Revelation, particularly the Revelation of the Scriptures, 1805, 1828, 1853. This is a short work divided into sections on: reason, revelation in general, infidelity, scripture, faith, and experience.
- Memoirs of the Life of Isaac Penington, to which is added a Review of his Writings, 1807.
- Memoirs of the Life and Travels in the service of the Gospel of Sarah Stephenson, chiefly from her own papers, 1807.
- The Life of the Apostle Paul as related in Scripture, but in which his epistles are inserted in that part of the history to which they are supposed respectively to belong; with select notes, critical, explanatory, and relating to persons and places, 1807, and corrected and enlarged 1811 .
- A Reply to so much of a Sermon published in the course of last year by Philip Dodd as relates to the well-known scruple of the Society of Friends, commonly called Quakers, against all Swearing, 1808. Against Philip Stanhope Dodd.
- Piety promoted in brief memorials and dying expressions of some of the Society of Friends, commonly called Quakers; the tenth part, to which is prefixed an historical account of the precedmg parts of volumes, and of their several compilers and editors, 2nd edition, 1811.

== Family ==
In 1776 Bevan married Mary Plumstead, who also became a Quaker minister. They had no children.

== See also ==
- List of abolitionist forerunners

== Notes ==
Attribution

This article incorporates text from a publication now in the public domain: "Bevan, Joseph Gurney". Dictionary of National Biography. London: Smith, Elder & Co. 1885–1900.
