= Richard Alexander Bevan =

British banker and philanthropist (1834–1918)

- Born: 14 July 1834; Brighton, East Sussex, England
- Died: 18 February 1918 (aged 83)
- Education: Harrow School; Trinity College, Cambridge
- Occupation: Banker
- Spouse: Laura Maria Polhill
- Children: 4 sons (including Robert Bevan), 2 daughters
- Parent(s): Richard Bevan; Charlotte Hunter
- Relatives: Silvanus Bevan (paternal great-great-grandfather); Timothy Bevan (paternal great-grandfather); Silvanus Bevan (paternal grandfather)

Richard Alexander Bevan (14 July 1834 – 18 February 1918) was a British banker and philanthropist. He is known as "the father of Cuckfield."

== Early life ==
Richard Alexander Bevan was born on 14 July 1834 in Brighton, England. His father, Richard Bevan, was a banker. His mother, Charlotte Hunter, was the daughter of Colonel Richard Hunter. He grew up at Highcliff Lodge, a house located at 128 Marine Parade, which is located on Marine Square in Kemptown, Brighton.

He was educated at Harrow School and Trinity College, Cambridge.

== Career ==
Bevan was a banker. He became a partner in the Brighton Union Bank which was founded in Brighton in 1805. The bank was set up by a deed of co-partnership between William Golding, James Browne, Nathaniel Hall, Richard Lashmar and Thomas West. It became Hall, Bevan, West and Bevans, before being taken over by Barclay, Bevan, Tritton, Ransom, Bouverie and Co in 1894, and going on to form part of Barclays Bank.

== Philanthropy ==
Bevan served as a Justice of the Peace and was the Treasurer of Brighton College, a private boarding school, from 1860 to 1918.

Bevan became known as "the father of Cuckfield." He built the Queen's Hall in Cuckfield in 1897 to commemorate the Queen's Diamond Jubilee.

== Personal life ==
Bevan married Laura Maria Polhill (daughter of Edward Polhill). They had four sons, including painter Robert Bevan, and two daughters. Their daughter Edith Bevan founded the Cuckfield Women’s Suffrage Society.

They resided on Brunswick Square, Hove, near Brighton. In 1862, they moved to Cuckfield, where he built Horsgate House in 1865.

== Death ==
Bevan died on 18 February 1918 and is buried in the Bevan family tomb at Holy Trinity Church, Cuckfield.
