= QSA =

QSA may refer to:

- Qt Script for Applications, a scripting engine
- Quaker Social Action
- Qualified Security Assessor, a certification by the Payment Card Industry (PCI) Security Standards Council
- Quantification Settlement Agreement, a water distribution plan
- Queens of the Stone Age, a band
- Queen's Scout Award
- Queen's South Africa Medal for service in the Boer War
- Queensland State Archives
- Queer-straight alliance
