= Quaker Gardens =

Quaker Gardens can refer to:

- Quaker Gardens, Islington, the former Quaker burial ground at Bunhill Fields, London
- Quaker Gardens, New Jersey, an unincorporated community
