= Fosbury House =

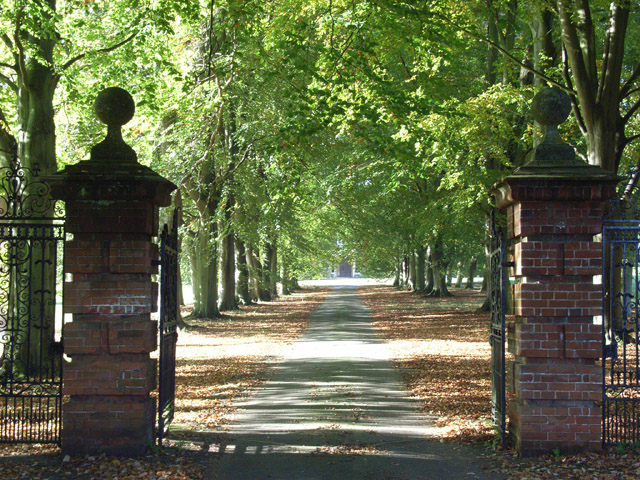
- The driveway to Fosbury House

- Location within Wiltshire
- 51.326°N 1.559°W
- Location: Fosbury, Wiltshire, England

History
- Built: 1800

Listed Building – Grade II
- Official name: Fosbury House
- Designated: 30 July 1986
- Reference no.: 1033995

Fosbury House is a Grade II listed country house northwest of the village of Fosbury in Wiltshire, England, about 11 miles (18 km) southeast of Marlborough.

The mansion was built about 1800, in limestone ashlar with a hipped tiled roof, and has three storeys. The three-bay front has a half-round Ionic portico and a pedimented gable. Lodges stand at the roadside entrances to the grounds: a two-storey building of c.1860 in flint and brick in the southwest, opposite the church; and a single-storey building in the northeast.

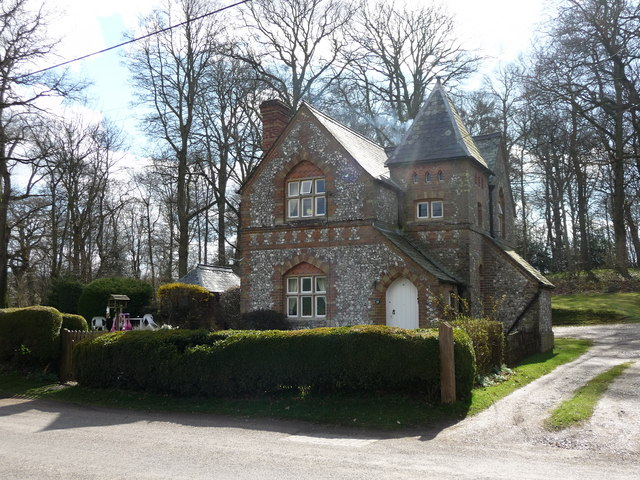
The south lodge

The house was purchased in 1810 by Silvanus Bevan, then passed to his son David Bevan, then to his son Robert Cooper Lee Bevan, then to his son Francis Augustus Bevan, four generations of bankers. At some point between 1899 and 1903, it was sold to Alfred Henry Huth (1850–1910), the bibliophile, and it housed the Huth Library until its dispersal in a series of sales after his death.

The house was recorded as Grade II listed in 1986, as was the brick and flint kitchen garden wall at the rear, which has piers with urn finials and cast-iron gates.

The house, together with 300 acres, was bought in 1993 by Erskine Guinness, son of Bryan Guinness, the writer and part of the Guinness brewing family. In 2005, Robert Hesketh, son of Colonel Roger Fleetwood-Hesketh, Conservative MP for Southport, died from "a cocktail of alcohol, heroin and cocaine" at an 18th birthday party there.
