= William Westbrooke Richardson =

Sussex High Sheriff 1770

William Westbrooke Richardson (died 23 July 1771) was High Sheriff of Sussex in 1770.

== Early life ==
William Westbrooke Richardson was the son of Joseph Richardson (1689-1734), barrister, and his wife Elizabeth Minshull.

== Career ==
In 1758 he was the owner of Mount Pleasant in East Barnet. Frederick Charles Cass wrote in his history of East Barnet that William Westbrooke Richardson was not connected with the Richardsons who owned the nearby Little Grove as far as he could tell.

He was elected a governor of Barnet Grammar School in 1759.

He was High Sheriff of Sussex in 1770.

== Death and legacy ==
Richardson died on 23 July 1771. His trustees sold Mount Pleasant to Sir William Henry Ashhurst after Richardson's death.

== See also ==
- Heene
