= Richard Bevan (banker, born 1788) =

British banker and philanthropist

- Born: 22 August 1788; Swallowfield, Berkshire, England
- Died: 4 February 1870 (aged 81)
- Occupation: Banker
- Spouses: Charlotte Hunter; Sarah Dewar
- Children: 1 son (Richard Alexander Bevan), 4 daughters
- Parent(s): Silvanus Bevan III; Louisa Kendall
- Relatives: Silvanus Bevan (paternal great-grandfather); Timothy Bevan (paternal grandfather); David Bevan (brother)

Richard Bevan (22 August 1788 – 4 February 1870) was a British banker and philanthropist. He was a co-founder of Barclays Bank.

== Early life ==
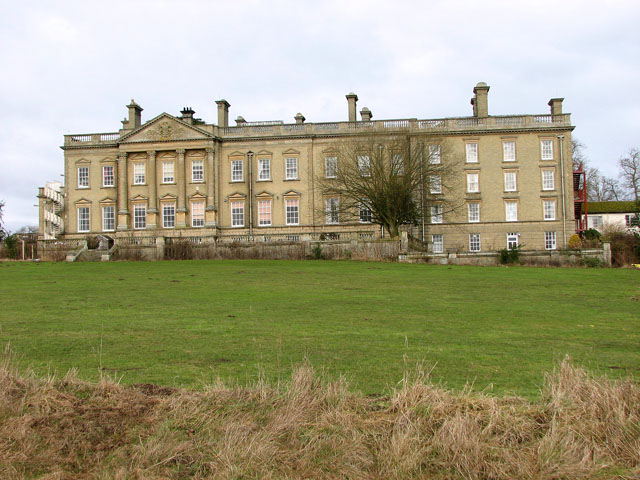
Riddlesworth Hall

Richard Bevan was born on 22 August 1788 at Swallowfield Park, Berkshire His father, Silvanus Bevan III, was a banker. His mother was Louisa Kendall. He grew up at Riddlesworth Hall with six siblings.

He was educated at Harrow School and Trinity College, Cambridge.

== Career ==
Bevan was a banker. He joined the Brighton Union Bank which had been set up in 1805 by a deed of co-partnership between William Golding, James Browne, Nathaniel Hall, Richard Lashmar and Thomas West. It became Hall, Bevan, West and Bevans, before being taken over by Barclay, Bevan, Tritton, Ransom, Bouverie and Co in 1894, and going on to form part of Barclays Bank.

== Philanthropy ==
Bevan made charitable contributions to the Widow's Friend and Benevolent Society.

== Personal life ==
Bevan married twice. His first wife was Charlotte Hunter, the daughter of Lt-Col Dunbar James Hunter & Seraphina Donclere. They married 30 August 1823. They had four daughters and one son, the banker Richard Alexander Bevan (1834–1918). Charlotte died in 1835.

In 1859, their youngest daughter Charlotte Louisa (1831–1911) married Percival Bosanquet (1831–1915), the son Augustus Henry Bosanquet and Louisa Priscilla Bevan (the eldest daughter of Richard's cousin David Bevan). Their daughters Theodosia (1828–1886) and Elizabeth Charlotte (1830–1894) both married clergymen. Their eldest daughter, Harriet Caroline, died as a toddler in 1834.

His second wife was Sarah (−1883), the daughter of Richard Cuming Dewar of Clapham, Surrey. She had been friends with his first wife Charlotte for many years. This marriage was childless.

He lived at Highcliff Lodge, 128 Marine Parade, which is located on Marine Square in Kemptown, Brighton.

== Death ==
Bevan died on 4 February 1870 and is buried in Brighton's Extra-Mural Cemetery.
