= Philip Stanhope Dodd =

Philip Stanhope Dodd (1775–1852) was a Church of England clergyman.

== Life ==
Philip Stanhope Dodd was son of the Rev. Richard Dodd (d. 1811), rector of Cowley, Middlesex and author of a translation of Formey's Ecclesiastical History. He was educated at Tonbridge School and Magdalene College, Cambridge, where he proceeded B.A. in 1796, M.A. in 1799, and was elected a fellow. In early life he was for some years curate of Camberwell, Surrey, which appointment he exchanged in 1803 for the ministry of Lambeth Chapel, retaining the afternoon lecture at Camberwell.

In 1806 he was chaplain to the lord mayor, Sir William Leighton. He was rewarded for his civic services by the valuable rectory of St Mary-at-Hill in the city of London in 1807, where he was one of the most popular divines of the metropolis.

In 1812 he was presented by his college to the sinecure rectory of Aldrington in Sussex, the church of which had been destroyed. Sir J. S. Sidney, bart., in 1819 gave him the rectory of Penshurst, Kent, worth £766 per annum, which was his last church preferment.

Dodd died at Penshurst Rectory 22 March 1852, aged 77. He married Martha, daughter of Colonel Wilson of Chelsea College.

== Works ==
In 1798 Dodd published anonymously Hints to Freshmen, from a Member of the University of Cambridge, of which a third edition was printed in 1807.

He published five sermons preached as chaplain to the lord mayor. The fourth of these, on The Lawfulness of Judicial Oaths and on Perjury, preached at St. Paul's Cathedral 31 May 1807, produced A Reply to so much of a sermon by Philip Dodd as relates to the scruples of the Quakers against all swearing, by Joseph Gurney Bevan. In 1837 he wrote A View of the Evidence afforded by the life and ministry of St. Paul to the truth of the Christian Revelation.
