= Shoreham College =

Location
- St Julian's Lane; Shoreham-by-Sea, West Sussex, BN43 6YW; England; 50.83289°N 0.24667°W

Information
- Type: Private day school
- Motto: Deus horam dat ('God gives the hour')
- Religious affiliation: Church of England
- Established: 1852; 174 years ago
- Local authority: West Sussex
- Department for Education URN: 126112 Tables
- Principal: S Bakhtiari
- Gender: Coeducational
- Age: 3 to 16
- Houses: Grenville; Nelson; Rodney; Raleigh
- Former pupils: Old Shorehamers
- Website: www.shorehamcollege.co.uk

Shoreham College is a private day school for boys and girls aged 3 to 16, which is located in Shoreham-by-Sea on the Sussex coast between Brighton and Worthing.

The school is a charitable trust whose trustees form the College Council. The current principal is Mrs Sarah Bakhtiari..

== History ==
Shoreham College was founded in 1852 as "New Protestant Shoreham Grammar School" by some "leading gentlemen of that town" and later renamed "Shoreham Grammar School". It was founded with the intention of educating local boys in classics, and "other branches of a liberal education" with a central focus on the Bible. The foundation was backed by townspeople and local clergymen against puseyism and the revival of Catholic traditions in the Church of England, in particular "High church". On 27 November 1852 an advertisement for pupils was published in the Brighton Herald.

One of the buildings the school occupies was formerly a house which dates back to the 18th century and is a Grade II listed building.

== Houses ==
Upon joining the school, pupils are placed in either Grenville, Nelson, Rodney or Raleigh house, to which they remain attached through their school career.

Throughout the year, many inter-house competitions take place, encompassing subject areas such as music, art and sport. During the school's Speech Day (a prize-giving event held at the end of each academic year), three prize shields are available for the house which has achieved: the most house points for pupils' good conduct; the best exam results; and the most points overall (gained from inter-house events over year).

== Notable former pupils ==
- Dele Belgore - Nigerian Lawyer
- John Bertalot - Organist
- Marcus Butler - Vlogger
- Peter Cushing - OBE, actor
- Gerald Dunning - Medievalist
- Chris Eubank Jr. - professional boxer
- Albert Kingwell - Architect
- Laurence L’Estrange - British Diplomat
- Geoffrey Munn - OBE, MVO, author, managing director of London jewellers, Wartski, BBC Antiques Roadshow jewellery expert
- Steve Nardelli - musician and songwriter
- David Ryall - Actor
- Hubert Scott-Paine - Boat and Aircraft designer
- Matthew Waterhouse - Actor
- Gerald Wild - Australian Politician, MBE, AM
