= Gerald Dunning =

Scholar and medievalist

Gerald Clough Dunning
- Born: 20 December 1905; Ventnor, Isle of Wight
- Died: 19 April 1978 (aged 72)
- Education: Bedford Modern School; University College London
- Spouse: Muriel Higham

Gerald Clough Dunning (20 December 1905 – 16 April 1978) was a pioneering scholar in the development of medieval British archaeology. His most significant contribution was to the study of post-Conquest pottery; he was largely responsible for establishing the first chronological framework by which different types of English ceramics could be dated. His work has been described as 'visionary' and 'seminal'. It has been said that Dunning did not achieve the profile of some of his peers as he did not write a text-book on either medieval pottery in particular or on medieval archaeology in general, but concentrated on writing articles for academic journals and encouraged the research interests of others. However, John Hurst argued that "we should regard Gerald Dunning as the main founding father of medieval archaeology as we know it today in the last quarter of the 20th Century".

== Career ==
Gerald Clough Dunning was the son of James and Mary (Clough) Dunning. He was born on 20 December 1905 at Ventnor, Isle of Wight. He was educated at Shoreham Grammar School and Bedford Modern School. His early interest in archaeology was fostered at Bedford through the school's archaeological society, and he also took on the task of mending broken pottery and also reassembling Bronze-Age skeletons from Dunstable Downs held in the school museum. At University College, London he took a BSc in Anthropology and in 1927 was awarded the university's Franks Studentship in Archaeology. From 1929 to 1934 he was based at the London Museum as Investigator of Building Excavations in the City of London on behalf of the Society of Antiquaries of London. From 1934 to 1942 he was Junior Investigator with the Royal Commission on the Ancient and Historical Monuments of Wales. From 1942 to 1946 he served in the meteorological service of the Royal Naval Volunteer Reserve. At the end of the war he returned to London as an Inspector of Ancient Monuments, where he remained until his retirement in 1965. He was appointed a Fellow of the Society of Antiquaries of London in 1935, and was awarded the degree of D.Lit by the University of London in 1968. He was a founding council member of the Society for Medieval Archaeology in 1957 and a founder and for 12 years Chairman of the Deserted Medieval Villages Research Group.

== Later medieval pottery ==
At the beginning of Dunning's career there was a general ignorance regarding the chronology of later English medieval pottery, and this problem began to occupy his mind during the rescue excavations he undertook in the City of London during the early 1930s. He later recalled:

I hastily planned Roman walls, drew sections, took photographs and scribbled notes on pieces of paper. We then left the sites, pausing for a glass of sherry at one of the very convenient pubs on the way, and returned to the Guildhall for lunch. Later in the afternoon and evening, I returned to the London Museum, there to disentangle my notes and start to draw the plans correctly and have a go at the pottery. Medieval pottery often turned up in the City and I began to draw this too. Often, in the evening Mortimer Wheeler used to come in to see what was the loot that day. He was as perplexed as I that not even a vague date could be given to the medieval pots.

In 1931 Dunning was awarded the Esher Research Studentship to study specifically medieval pottery and published his first two reports on groups of these objects in 1935. Over the following 40 years he developed the first chronology of later English medieval pottery. He was able to discern regional variations in use and production, and through research in France, the Low Countries, Scandinavia and Germany, insular from imported pottery in England, as well as English exports to the Continent.

According to Hurst, "Because of all this work, we have a basic framework on which our present knowledge of medieval pottery and many other classes of object is founded".

== Anglo-Saxon archaeology ==
Dunning also published extensively on Anglo-Saxon pottery, most notably on Saxo-Norman wheel-thrown types from East Anglia. He also examined late Anglo-Saxon pottery imports from the Rhineland to understand the complexity of North Sea trade routes during the period. He collaborated with Sonia Chadwick Hawkes on a study of some of the ornamental migration period grave goods excavated from Anglo-Saxon cemeteries in Kent.

== Other research ==
In all, Dunning produced 302 published articles, 188 of them were concerned with medieval or Anglo-Saxon pottery. His many other research interests included: French and English schist hones, stone mortars from Purbeck and Caen, the medieval Devon slate trade, black marble Tournai fonts in England and on the Continent, ceramic roof furniture such as chimney pots, finials and roof-tile crests, Iron-Age Swan's neck and Ring-headed pins and late Anglo-Saxon belt buckles. He carried out excavations at a stone circle and cairn in Brecknockshire, Salmonsbury Camp Hillfort, Gloucestershire, an Anglo-Saxon site at Bourton on the Water and at Roman Gloucester, among others. The British Museum holds over 500 objects, mainly medieval pottery artefacts, donated by Dunning and the Conway Library has photographs attributed to Dunning. The Conway Library's archive of primarily architectural images is in the process of being digitised under the wider Courtauld Connects project.

== Personal life ==
Dunning was a keen oarsman in his youth, and throughout his life wore a boater with his Old School rowing colours every summer. Later in life he became an expert on Academic and Ecclesiastical dress. He could distinguish all the robes from the major European universities and also collected Cardinals' hats.

He married Muriel Higham in 1938; they had a son and daughter. Gerald Dunning died on 16 April 1978.
