= Albert Kingwell =

English architect

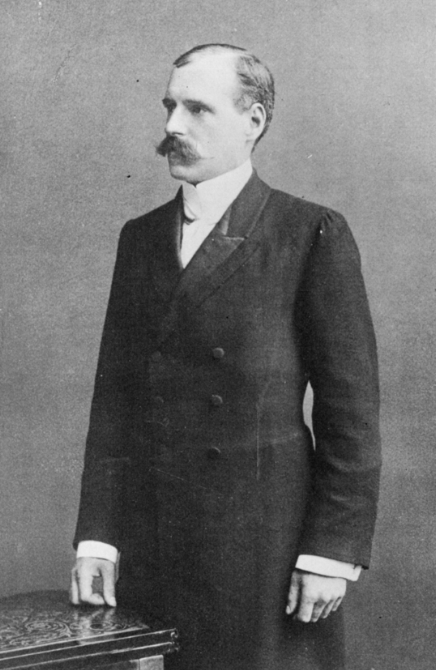
Albert Edward Kingwell in 1899

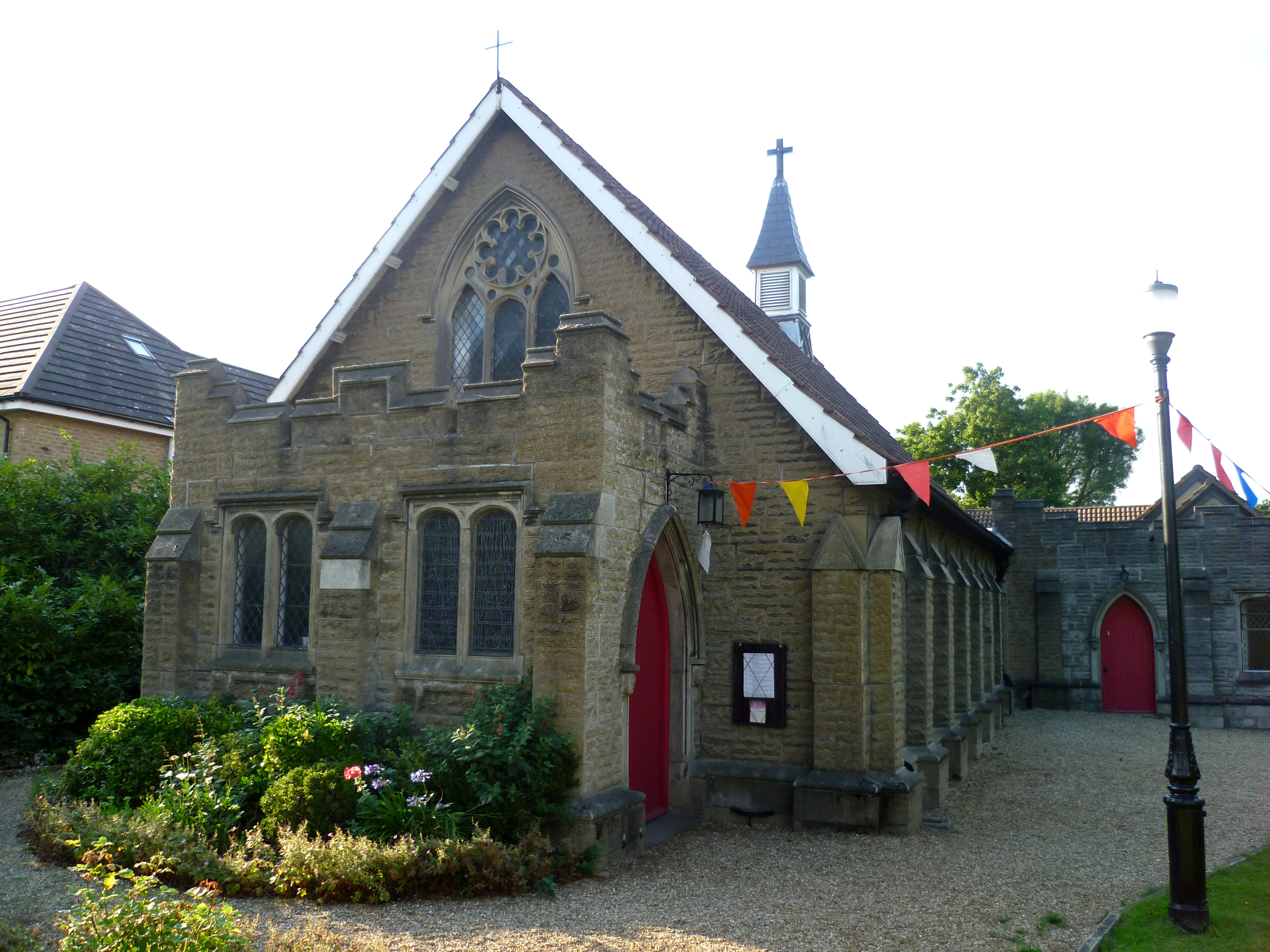
St Paul's Church, the first church in Hadley Wood. Built in concrete in 1910–11 to the plan of Albert Kingwell.

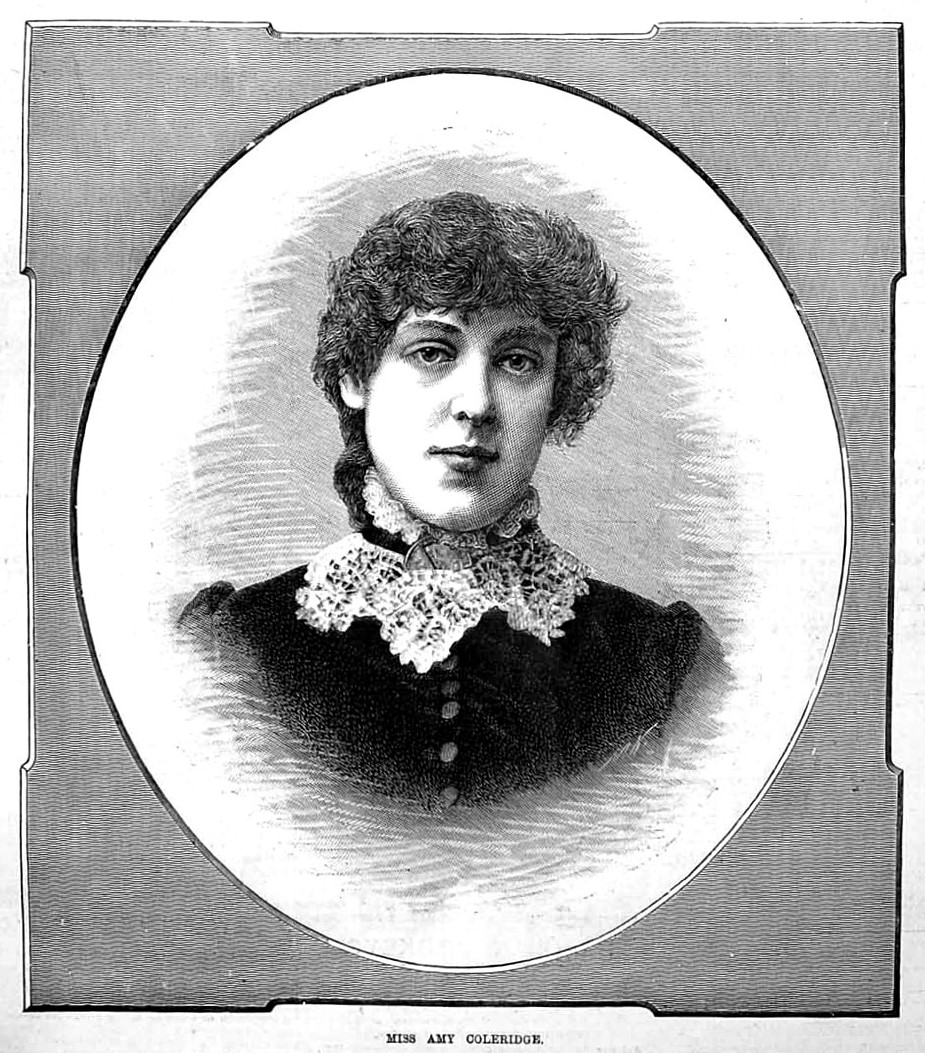
Amy Coleridge from the cover of The Illustrated Sporting & Dramatic News, January 1886.

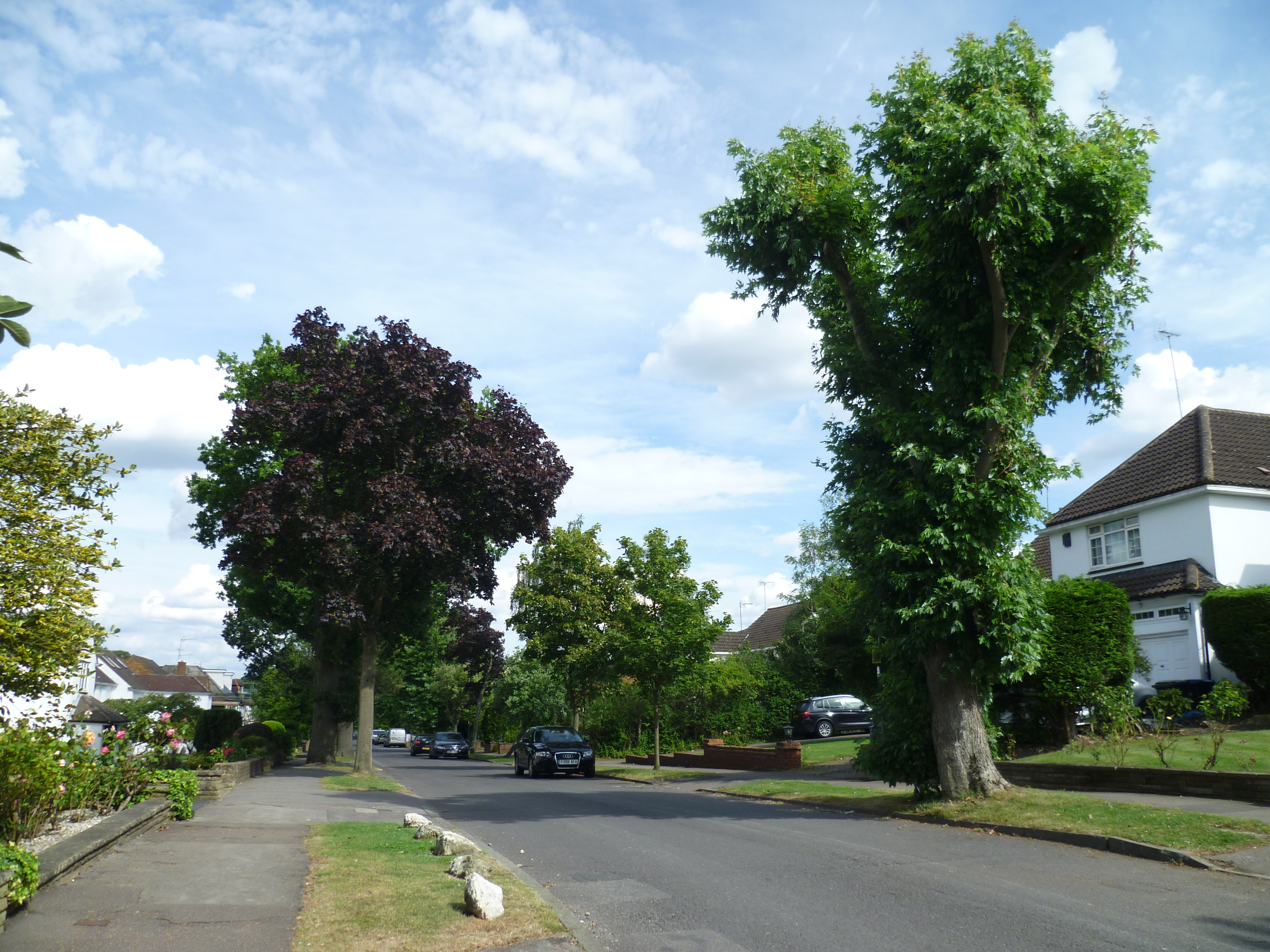
Kingwell Road, Hadley Wood.

Albert Edward Kingwell FRIBA (3 January 1863 – 10 November 1949) was an English architect, surveyor and land agent who was one of the first to use concrete in his practice. He oversaw the Jack Estate at Hadley Wood in Hertfordshire for more than 50 years.

== Early life and education ==
Albert Edward Kingwell was born in London shortly after New Year's 1863, the only son of the carriage-builder Frederick Kingwell (born Plymouth 1819). and Eliza Kingwell. He was educated at Shoreham Grammar School and Lancing College. He studied at the École de Dessin in Paris, the Architectural Association School of Architecture and at the Royal College of Art before being apprenticed to George Edwards.

== Career ==
Kingwell began in private practice in London in 1886. In 1899, he drew up plans for buildings in Beech Hill Park Estate when he was practising at 103–104 Cheapside, London, noting on them that he was "sole agent". In March 1908, still at Cheapside, he was elected a member of The Society of Architects. He was also a member of the Institution of Constructional Engineers, the Royal Sanitary Institute and a founder member of the Concrete Institute.

Sometime in the early 1900s, he succeeded Charles Payne as agent for the Jack Estate and moved into No. 1 Crescent West, Hadley Wood, where the estate office was located and where he and his wife had their home for the rest of their lives.

In 1910–11, Kingwell was the architect, for which service he did not charge, of Hadley Wood's first church, St Paul's Church, built in concrete on one acre of land donated by Charles Jack and the Duchy of Lancaster. Although not a churchgoer himself, he presented a stained glass window of St Paul to the church in his wife's name and left the church £100 in his will.

In an obituary it was claimed that Kingwell was one of the first architects to build and reinforce buildings in London using concrete.

== Personal life ==
In 1885, Kingwell, of Albert House, Theobald's Road, was sued by William Haviland and his wife Amy Coleridge for the return of £5 that was said by them to have been lent to him by Amy in 1883 when she was acting in New York before her marriage. It was said in evidence that before she went to America, Kingwell and Amy had been lovers. He had given her a ring and her letters from America had referred to him as "my husband" but she had subsequently married Haviland without Kingwell's knowledge. Kingwell had thought them engaged. Amy had been in the habit of giving Kingwell money as he was an architect in "very poor circumstances". She had written to him saying "everything I have must belong to you". Amy's mother, Adelaide M'Kay, an actress by the stage name of Wilmore, pointed out however that Kingwell was the son of a successful coach builder. The judge ruled for Kingwell as the correspondence between the couple was of such a "passionate" nature and in such terms as to prevent the money being regarded as a loan.

Amy Coleridge later had a distinguished career on the South African stage.

Kingwell married Eva Mary Squires in the Hampstead district of London in 1901. The couple apparently had no children. According to the 1911 census, by which time they were living in Hadley Wood, they were able to employ one servant. Albert bred horses after he moved to Hadley, particularly Polo ponies, which he exported to Europe. In 1910, Mrs Kingwell showed two Brood mares at the annual Polo and Riding Pony Society show at the Agricultural Hall, London.

Kingwell was a Freemason and a founder member of The Society of Architects Lodge and Chapter in 1921. He was a member of Enfield Council for Hadley Wood from 1922 to 1937.

== Health and death ==
Kingwell later suffered from arthritis, requiring one stick, then two, then crutches, and ultimately confined to a bath-chair. He died on 10 November 1949 at The Nursing Home, Beech Hill, Hadley Wood. He left an estate of £22,611.

Kingwell Road in Hadley Wood is named after him. Eva died on 16 January 1950 at 1 Crescent West, Hadley Wood. The house was demolished in the 1960s and replaced by other buildings.
