= Joan Dant =

English pedlar and benefactor

- Born: 1631; Spitalfields
- Died: 1715 (aged 83–84)
- Burial place: Quaker Gardens, Islington
- Occupation: Pedlar

Joan Dant (1631–1715) was an English pedlar. Born in Spitalfields, in the East End of London, she married a weaver. Upon her husband's premature death, she was forced to become a pedlar, selling goods to fellow Quakers in the environs of London. Thanks to her frugality and good business sense, she became a rich merchant, leaving £9,150 (equivalent to about £1,728,000 in 2025) in her will when she died in 1715.

== Life ==
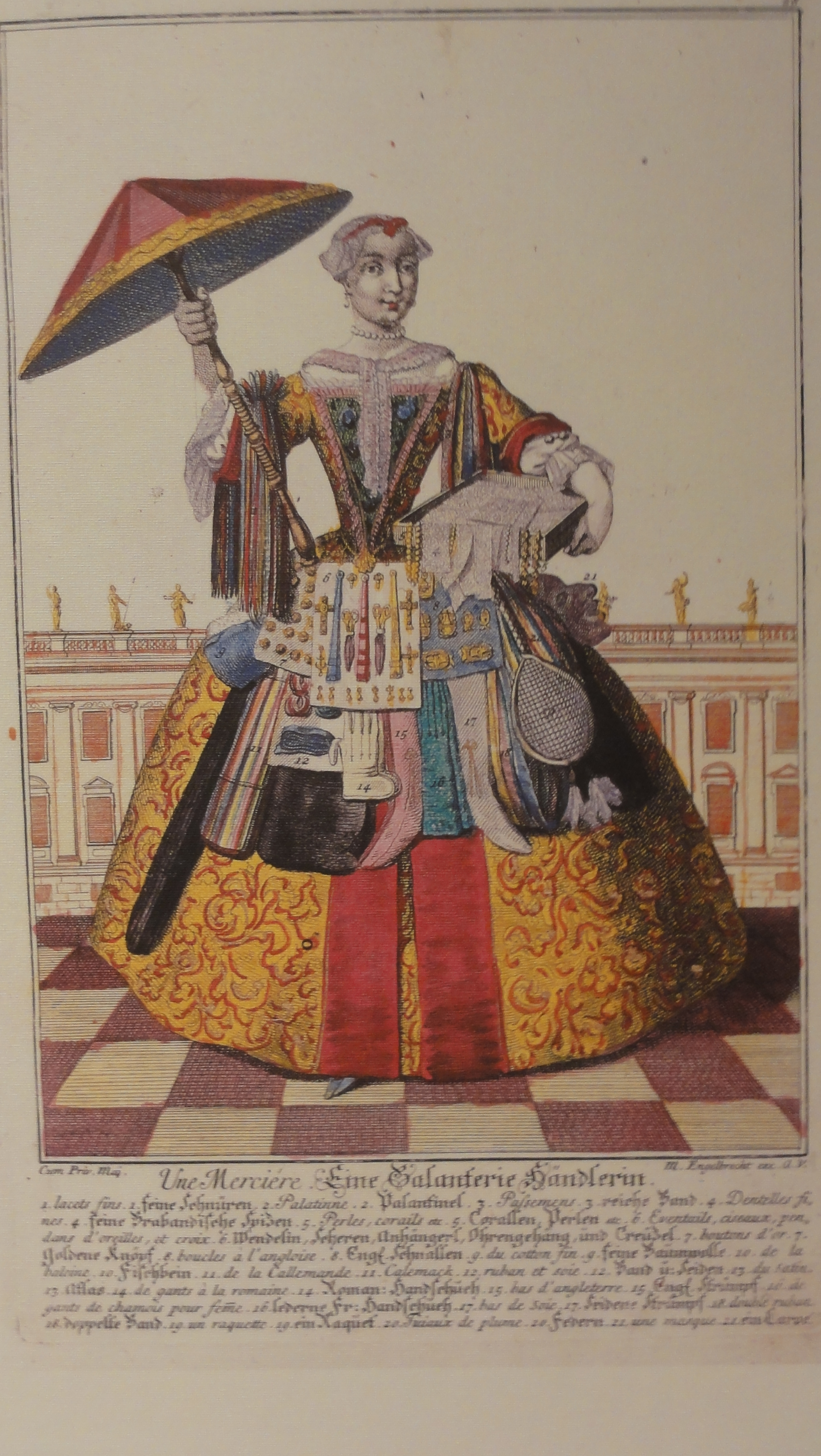
A pedlar with her wares

There are few details concerning Dant's early life. She was born in 1631, in Spitalfields, in the East End of London, and married a weaver.

Upon the early death of her husband, Dant was forced to become a pedlar in order to survive. Carrying products on her back, she sold haberdashery, hosiery and mercery, mostly in the countryside around London. She was an upright Quaker and therefore could sell to fellow Friends. Her business increased and since she remained frugal, Dant had enough money to start trading for goods from abroad, becoming a successful merchant. By 1711, she had been invited to join the monthly Women's Meetings of Quakers in London.

Dant died in 1715, aged 84. At the time of making her will, she was worth more than £9,000. She gave some of her savings away to the London Yearly Meeting of Quakers and its poorer attendees, saying "I got it by the rich and I mean to leave it to the poor". After her death, the executors set the sum at £9,150 (equivalent to about £1,727,701 in 2025). They sold off her remaining shop stock of silk stockings, silk gloves and raw silk for £123.45, her silverplate for £16 and other household goods for £70. Dant had also left behind £2,581 in cash, £1,000 of shares in a lead mine, investments in five trading ships and £4,375 in various other stocks and annuities, including East India Company bonds.

Dant was buried at a Quaker cemetery at Bunhill Fields in London.

== Legacy ==
According to the Oxford Dictionary of National Biography, Dant is regarded as "a rare example of a female capitalist from before the Industrial Revolution." Having given £110 to the poor and £1800 to Quaker organisations, she set up a fund to help poor Friends, which was still giving out grants of under £2 (equivalent to about £220 in 2025) to deserving individuals in 1844.
