= St Paul's Church, Hadley Wood =

Coordinates: 51.6669°N 0.17093°W

St Paul's Church
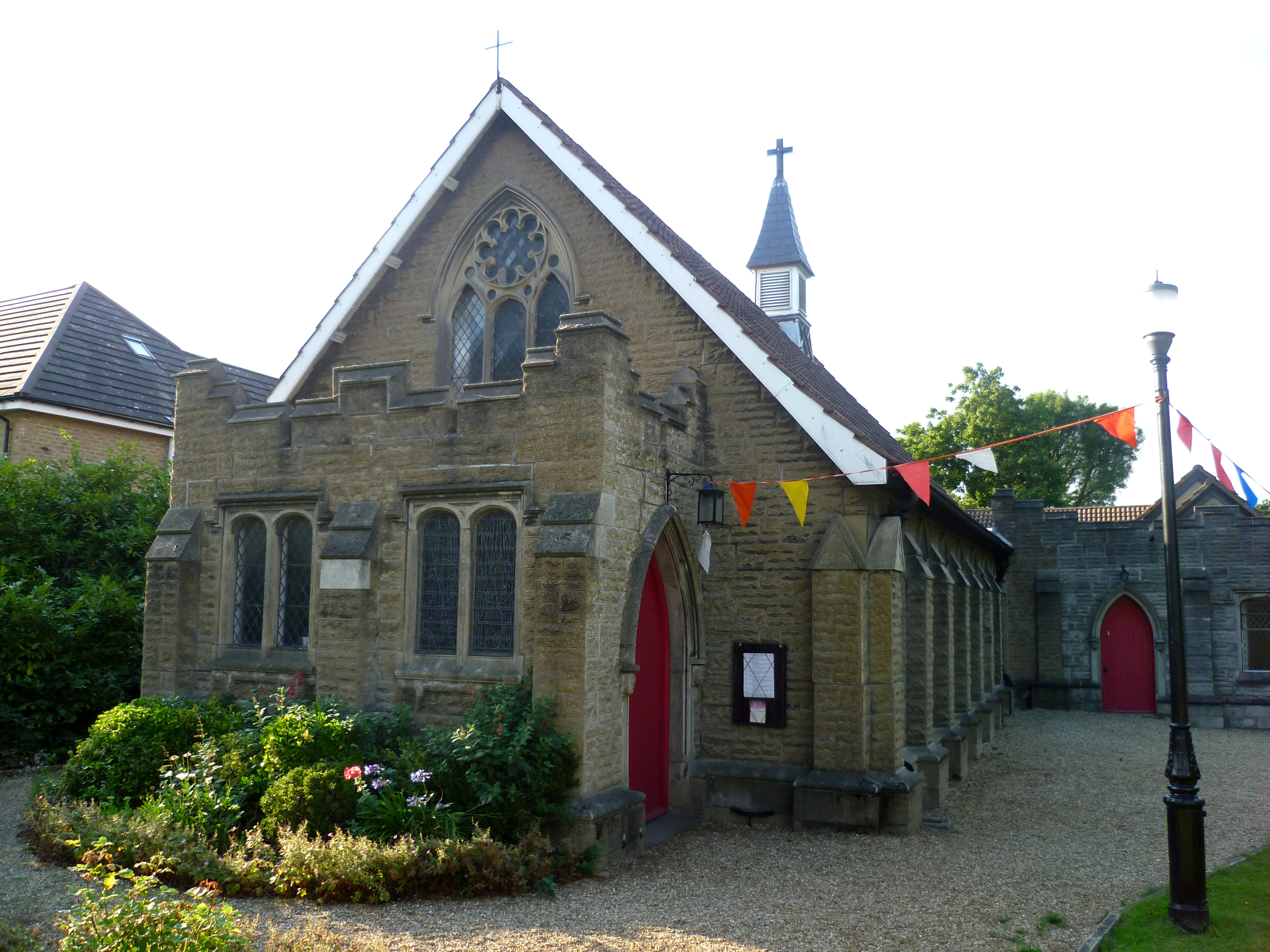
- St Paul's Church
- Location: Camlet Way, Hadley Wood, Greater London, EN4 0EN
- Country: England
- Denomination: Church of England
- Churchmanship: Conservative Evangelical

History
- Status: Active

Architecture
- Functional status: Proprietary chapel

Administration
- Diocese: Diocese of London
- Archdeaconry: Archdeaconry of Hampstead
- Deanery: Enfield
- Parish: St Paul Hadley Wood

Clergy
- Bishop: The Rt Revd Rod Thomas (AEO)

St Paul's Church is a Church of England proprietary chapel in Hadley Wood, London.

== History ==
Albert Kingwell, agent for Charles Jack, arranged for the conveyance from the Duchy of Lancaster of an acre of land on which to build the church and was also the architect. He also presented a stained window to the church. It was a condition of the transfer of the land that a church be built within three years. The building was originally known as the Church Room, only becoming St Paul's Church in 1936. The church opened in 1911, and was initially an offshoot of Christ Church, Cockfosters. It became independent in 2000.

== Present day ==
The church holds weekly services on Sundays. St Paul's belongs to the Conservative Evangelical tradition of the Church of England. As a parish, it supports complementary gender roles, and it has passed resolutions to reject the ordination of women. It receives alternative episcopal oversight from the Bishop of Ebbsfleet.
