= Quaker Gardens, Islington =

Public garden and former burial ground in London

Coordinates: 51°31′25.23″N 0°5′27.78″W

Quaker Gardens
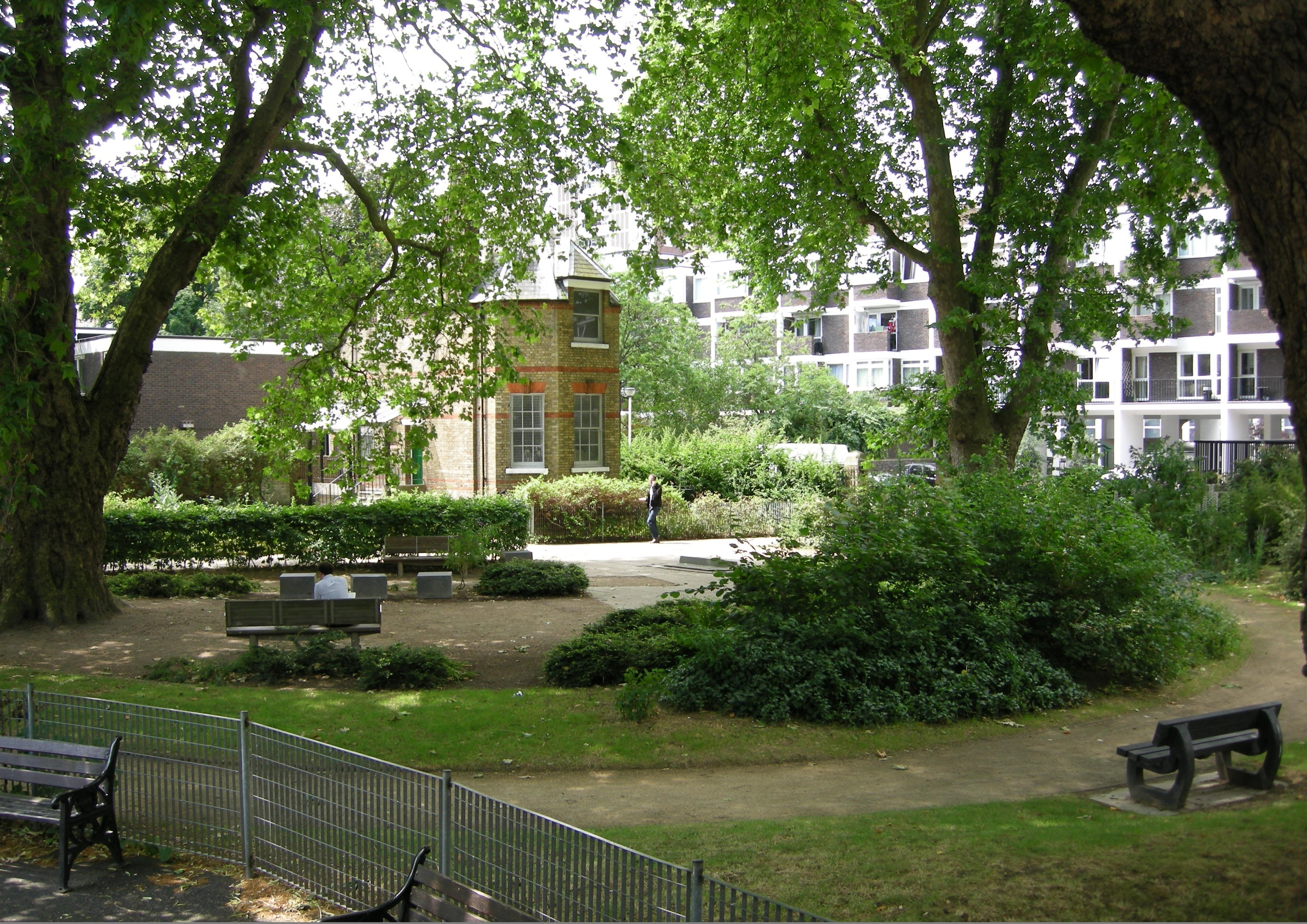
- View of Quaker Gardens. The brick building in the background is the former caretaker's house of the Bunhill Memorial Buildings (1881), now a Quaker meeting house.
- Interactive map of Quaker Gardens

Details
- Established: 1661
- Location: London Borough of Islington
- Country: England
- Type: Public (closed)
- Owned by: London Borough of Islington
- No. of interments: 12,000
- Find a Grave: Quaker Gardens

Quaker Gardens is a small public garden in the extreme south of the London Borough of Islington, close to the boundary with the City of London, in the area known historically as Bunhill Fields. It is managed by Islington Borough Council. It comprises the surviving fragment of a former burying ground for Quakers (members of the Religious Society of Friends), in use from 1661 to 1855. George Fox (d. 1691), one of the founders of the movement, was among those buried here.

The gardens lie to the west of Bunhill Row, to the south of Banner Street, and to the north of Chequer Street, and can be entered from either Banner Street or Chequer Street. In addition to the public garden, the site includes a children's playground and a tarmac ball court with basketball hoops. A Quaker meeting house, the last remaining part of the former Bunhill Memorial Buildings, stands at the north-west corner of the gardens.

== History ==
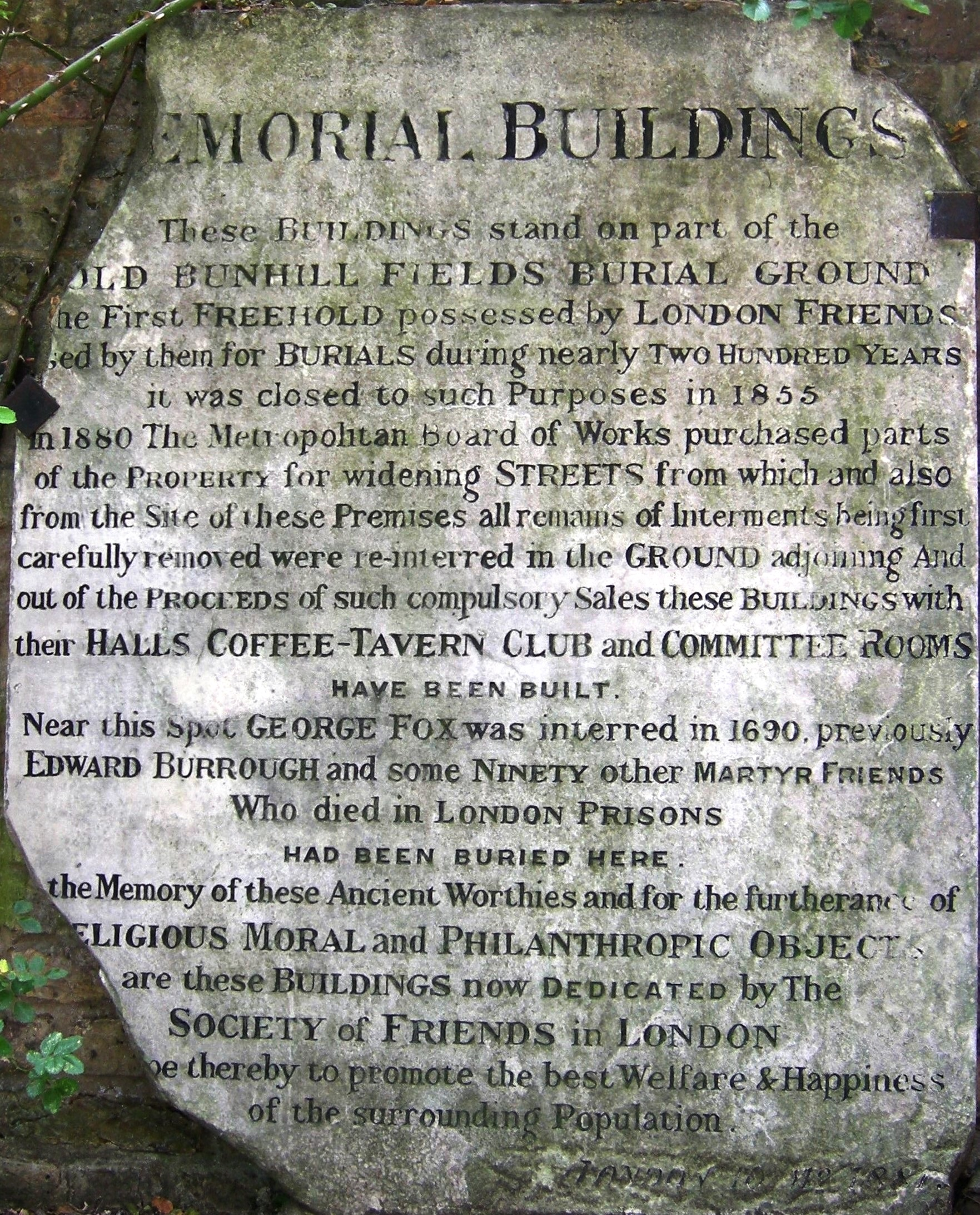
Bomb-damaged foundation tablet from the Memorial Buildings, outlining the site's history

The site lies in the area known historically as Bunhill Fields. The name derives from "Bone Hill", which is possibly a reference to the district having been used for occasional burials from at least Saxon times, but more probably alludes to the use of the fields as a place of deposit for human bones – amounting to over 1,000 cartloads – brought from St Paul's Cathedral charnel house in 1549 when that building was demolished.

In 1661 the London Quakers purchased a plot of land here of 30 square yards for £270 for use as a burial ground: it constituted the first freehold property owned by Quakers in London. This was four years earlier than the opening of the nearby "Dissenters'" burial ground, on the other side of Bunhill Row, which is still known as Bunhill Fields. As well as burials arising from routine deaths, the bodies of 1,177 Quakers who died in the Great Plague of 1665–66 were buried here. The ground was soon full, but additional plots of land were purchased to extend it, until by c. 1845 about £3,600 had been invested in the site. The ground was closed for burials in 1855, by which date around 12,000 burials had taken place.

Graves were not individually marked with monuments or gravestones. The sole exception was a small tablet on the wall, simply inscribed "G. F.", in commemoration of George Fox (1624–1691), one of the founders of the movement. However, so many Quakers came to visit this that it was denounced as "Nehushtan" (idolatrous) by Robert Howard, a prominent member of the Society, and was destroyed. Fox is now commemorated by a more modern marker, also set against the wall.

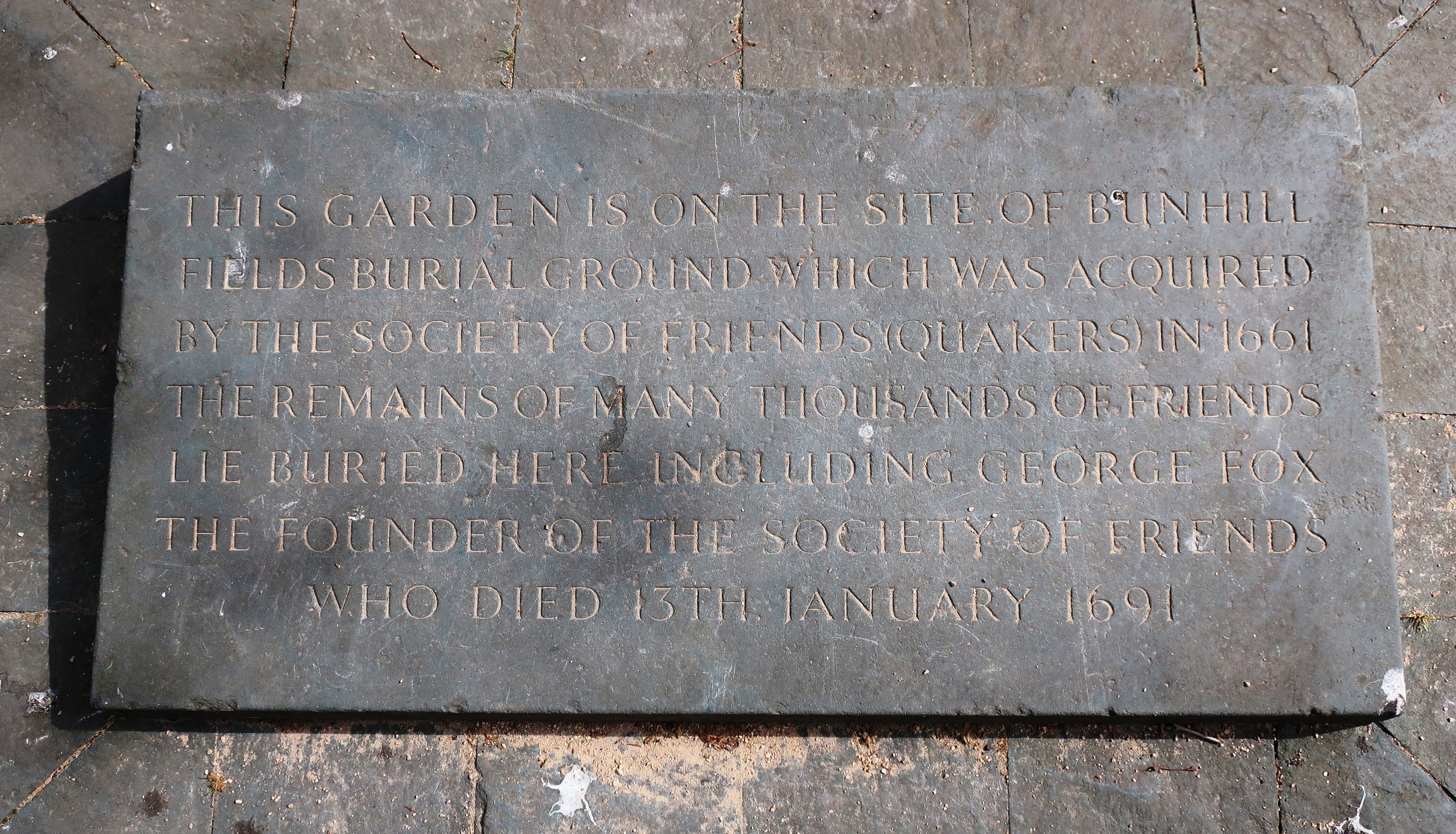
Modern commemorative memorial stone in the centre of the gardens

In the 1870s the Bedford Institute Association (BIA), a Quaker mission, began to hold meetings at the ground, initially in a tent and subsequently in a corrugated iron room. In 1880 a large part of the burial ground was acquired by the Metropolitan Board of Works for road-widening and building purposes, including the building of a Board school. These parts of the site were cleared of burials, and the exhumed bodies reinterred in the surviving part of the burial ground. With the proceeds from the sale of the land, the Quakers built Bunhill Memorial Buildings (opened 1881), which was leased to the BIA: it incorporated a large Meeting House, committee rooms, an adult school, a reading room, a medical mission, lodging rooms, and a teetotal "Coffee-Tavern Club".

The burial ground suffered bomb damage in the Second World War, and in 1944 the Memorial Buildings were largely destroyed. The only part of the Buildings to survive was the detached caretaker's house, which was redeveloped by the BIA in 1976, and is still in use as a Quaker Meeting House.

== Notable burials ==
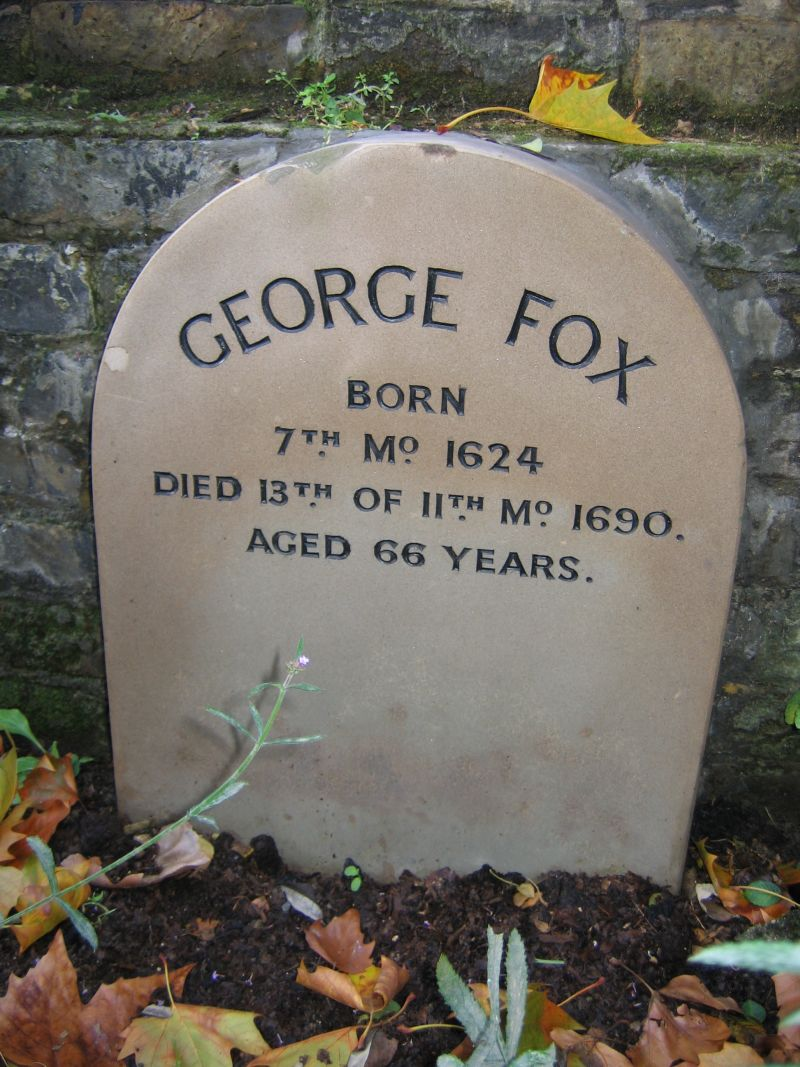
Memorial to George Fox (d. 1691)

- Ann Austin (d. 1665), travelling Quaker preacher
- John Bellers (1654–1725), political and educational theorist and writer
- Joseph Gurney Bevan (1753–1814), writer of Quaker apologetical works
- Edward Burrough (1634–1663), Quaker leader and controversialist
- Joan Dant (1631–1715), pedlar
- George Fox (1624–1691), a founder of the Quaker movement
- John Nickolls (?1710–1745), collector and antiquary
- Daniel Quare (1649–1724), clockmaker
- George Whitehead (1636–1723), Quaker leader and author of memoir, The Christian Progress of George Whitehead

== Bibliography ==
- Butler, David M. (1999). The Quaker Meeting Houses of Britain. Vol. 1. London: Friends Historical Society. p. 380. ISBN 0900469447.
- Holmes, Mrs Basil [Isabella M.] (1896). The London Burial Grounds: notes on their history from the earliest times to the present day. London: T.F. Unwin. pp. 133–135, 141–142.
