= Daniel Quare =

British clockmaker

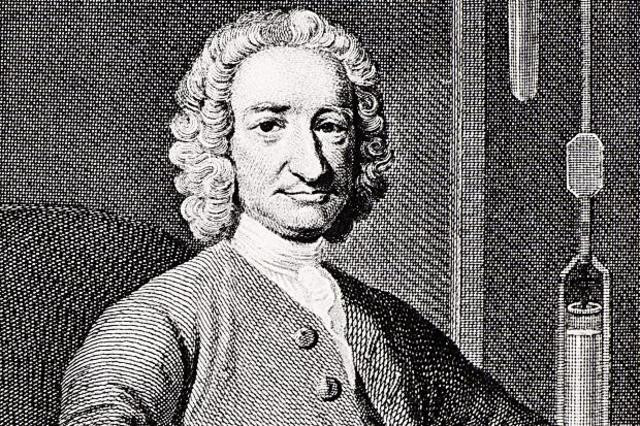
- Born: 1648 or 1649; Somerset, England
- Died: 21 March 1724
- Occupation: Clockmaker
- Relatives: Silvanus Bevan (son-in-law)

Daniel Quare (1648 or 1649 – 21 March 1724) was an English clockmaker and instrument maker who invented a repeating watch movement in 1680 and a portable barometer in 1695.

== Early life ==
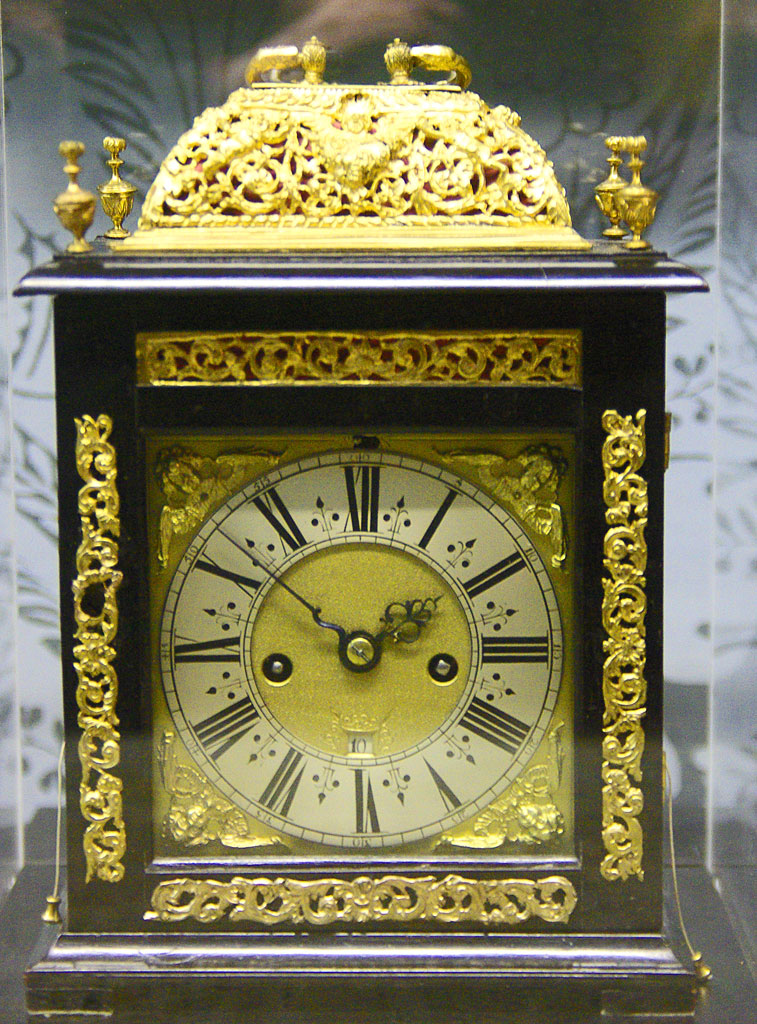
Bracket clock by Daniel Quare on display at the Walker Art Gallery, Liverpool

Daniel Quare's origins are obscure. He was possibly a native of Somerset, and is believed to have been born in 1648 or 1649. Nothing is known of his parentage, although he is presumed to have come from a strict Quaker family. No record has been traced of his apprenticeship.

== Career ==
On 3 April 1671 he was admitted a brother of the Clockmakers' Company. One of the early members of the Friends' (Quakers') meeting at Devonshire House, Bishopsgate, he married there, on 18 April 1676, Mary, daughter of Jeremiah Stevens, maltster, of High Wycombe, Buckinghamshire. In the register-book he is described as "clockmaker, of Martins-le-Grand in the liberty of Westminster".

Soon afterwards, Quare moved to the parish of St Anne and St Agnes within Aldersgate, where in 1678, for refusing to pay a rate for the maintenance of the clergy of the parish, his goods to the value of £5 were seized to defray a fine of £2 12s. 6d. The next year, "for fines imposed for refusing to defray the charge of the militia, two clocks and two watches were taken from him". A little later he settled in Lombard Street, whence he migrated in 1685 to the King's Arms in Exchange Alley, long a favourite home for watchmakers. In 1683 Quare and five other Friends had "their goods seized to the value of £195 17s. 6d. for attending meeting at White Hart Court". On 4 June 1686 Quare, with about fifty other Friends, was summoned to appear before the commissioners appointed by James II to sit at Clifford's Inn to hear their grievances. He was fined again in 1689, but he was subsequently taken into William III's favour. On Quare's petition two Friends imprisoned in Westmorland were released, and on 2 May 1695 he introduced four Friends, including George Whitehead and Gilbert Latey, to a private interview with William III. Quare and nineteen other quakers signed a petition to the commons, presented by Edmond Waller on 7 February 1696.

When Quare began his career horology was rapidly advancing. The pendulum was a novelty; so were the spiral spring and anchor escapement invented by Robert Hooke, and the fusee chain. To Quare belongs the honour of inventing repeating watches, and it is also claimed for him that he adapted the concentric minute hand. If he was actually the inventor of the latter, he must have constructed it early in his career, for two concentric hands are shown in a diagram in Christiaan Huygens's Horologium Oscillatorium (1673). Clocks and watches made by Quare with only one hand are extant, or with two circles and pointers, one for the hours and another for the minutes, and the concentric invention did not quickly supersede this arrangement even in Quare's own workshop. In the London Gazette for 25–29 March 1686, is an advertisement for a lost "pendulum" watch made by Quare, that had only one hand, but was curiously arranged to give the minutes: "it had but 6 hours upon the dial plate, with 6 small cipher figures within every hour; the hand going round every 6 hours, which shows also the minutes between every hour."

When in 1687 Edward Booth, alias Barlow, applied for a patent for "pulling or repeating clocks and watches", the Clockmakers' Company successfully opposed the application on the ground that the alleged invention was anticipated by a watch previously invented and made by Quare. The latter's watch was superior to Barlow's, because it repeated both the hour and the quarter with one pressure, while Barlow's required two.

Wood gives an account of a watch made by Quare for James II, but the references are inaccurate. Quare is also said to have made a repeating watch for William III. He certainly made a very fine clock for the king, which went for a year without rewinding. Being specially made for a bedroom, it did not strike. The clock still stands in its original place, by the side of the king's bed, in Hampton Court Palace, and shows sundial time, latitude and longitude, and the course of the sun. In 1836 the clock was altered by Benjamin Lewis Vulliamy, the equation work being disconnected and partly removed, a new pendulum provided, and the clock fitted with a deadbeat escapement. The case is surmounted by five well-modelled gilt figures, the complete height being over ten feet. The going train is similar to another year clock made by Quare. F. J. Britten says of it: "It seems almost incredible for 81 lb. × 4 ft. 6 in. to drive the clock for more than 13 months, but everything was done that was possible to economise the force. The very small and light swing wheel, the balanced minute hand, and the small shortened arbors with extra fine pivots, all conduce to the end in view." The weight in the Hampton Court clock was still less, being only 72 lb. There is also at the Royal Hospital, Greenwich, a very curious clock by Quare with a double pendulum.

On 2 August 1695, in the face of some opposition from the Clockmakers' Company, a patent was granted to Quare for a portable barometer. The barometer, in the words of the patent, "may be removed and carried to any place, though turned upside down, without spilling one drop of the quicksilver or letting any air into the tube, and yet nevertheless the air shall have the same liberty to operate upon it as on those common ones now in use with respect to the weight of the atmosphere". None of these portable barometers are known to exist, but a good example of a "common" sort made by Quare is at Hampton Court.

Quare was chosen a member of the court of assistants in the Clockmakers' Company in 1697, warden in 1705 and 1707, and master of the company in 1708.

== Death ==
Quare died on 21 March 1724, aged 75, at his country house at Croydon, and was buried in the Quaker burial ground, Chequer Alley, Bunhill Fields, on 27 March. The Daily Post of Thursday, 26 March, reported: "Last week dy'd Mr. Daniel Quare, watchmaker in Exchange Alley, who was famous both here and at foreign courts for the great improvements he made in that art, and we hear he is succeeded in his shop and trade by his partner, Mr. Horseman", i.e. Stephen Horseman, apprenticed to Quare in 1702, and admitted to the Clockmakers' Company in 1709.

His will, made on 3 May 1723, was proved on 26 March 1724 by Jeremiah, his son and executor. Among other bequests, Quare left to his wife £2,800, all his household goods, both in London and in the country, and "the two gold watches she usually wears, one of them being a repeater and the other a plain watch". The widow lived with her son, Jeremiah, until her death on 4 November 1728 (aged 77) in the parish of St Dionis Backchurch, Lime Street. Of Quare's children who survived infancy there were, besides the son Jeremiah, a "merchant", three daughters: Anna, married to John Falconer; Sarah, wife of Jacob Wyan; and Elizabeth, who married, on 10 November 1715, Silvanus Bevan, "citizen and apothecary". At Elizabeth's wedding, Sarah, duchess of Marlborough, signed the register (along with seventy-two other witnesses).
