= Belmont, East Barnet =

House in East Barnet, London, England

Coordinates: 51.6465°N 0.1505°W

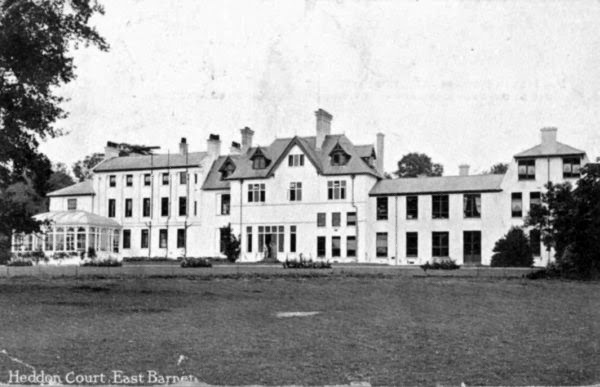
Heddon Court, c. 1910s.

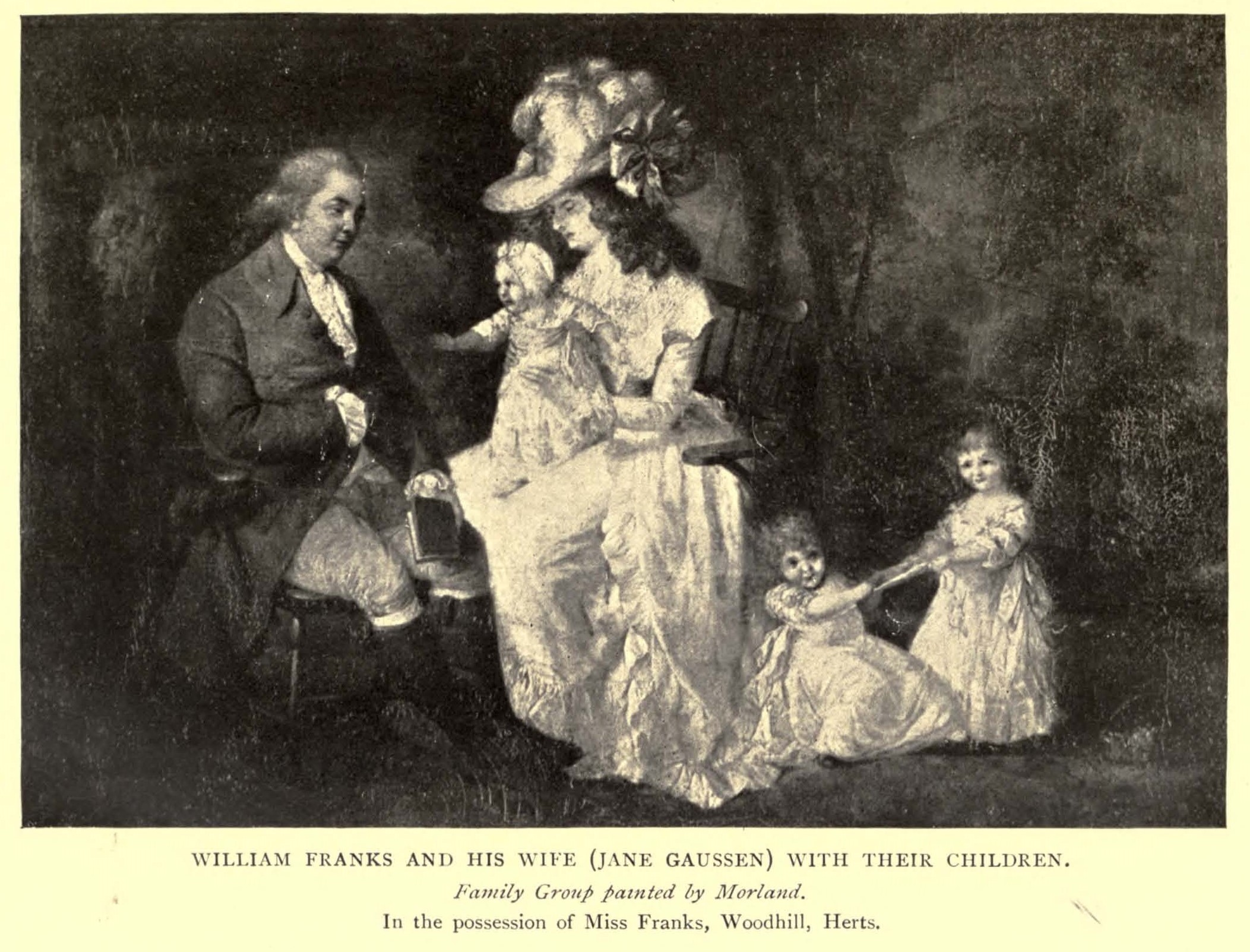
William Franks and his wife (Jane Gaussen) with their children. George Morland, n.d. Owner of Mount Pleasant 1786-90.

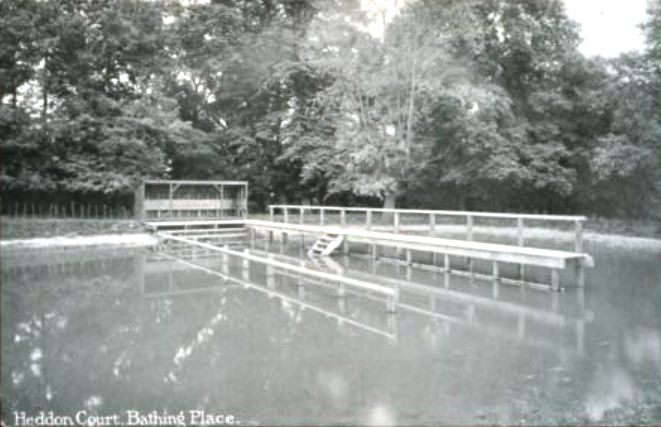
Heddon Court bathing place, 1912.

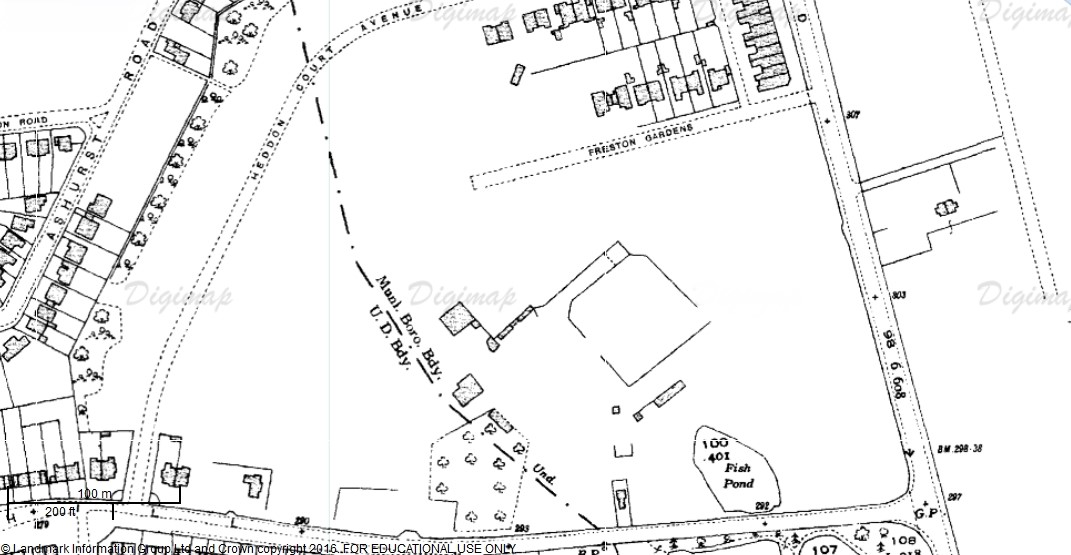
Heddon Court (centre) on a 1930s Ordnance Survey map, outside the boundary of East Barnet and within the borders of Southgate/Enfield.

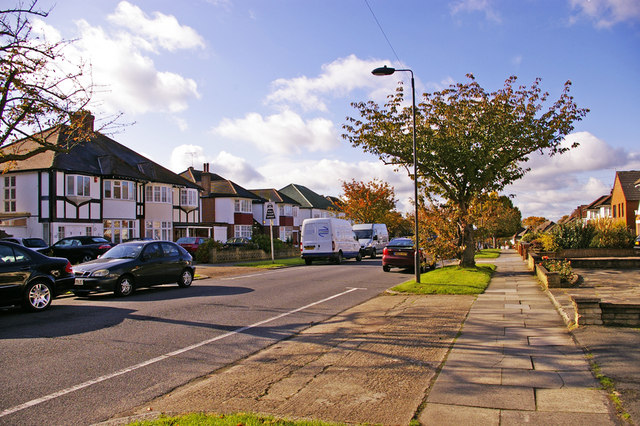
Heddon Court Avenue

Belmont, originally known as Mount Pleasant, was a house in East Barnet, London, near Cockfosters, that dated back to the sixteenth century. By the end of the nineteenth century it had become Heddon Court and was the home of a preparatory school for boys. The school closed in 1933 and the house was demolished. The site is now occupied by suburban housing.

== History ==
The estate later known as Mount Pleasant was held in the sixteenth century by a member of the Rolfe family who is mentioned in sources as early as 1406. There were originally two houses on the site, one of which was held early in the seventeenth century by William Howard, son of Lord William Howard. These two houses were converted into one capital messuage called Mount Pleasant, which in 1636 was held by William Greene. During part of 1635 it was tenanted by Elias Ashmole the antiquary.

William Greene was succeeded by his eldest daughter Grace, wife of Edward Pecke, and in 1758 Mount Pleasant was the property of William Westbrooke Richardson, who was elected a governor of Barnet Grammar School in the following year. His trustees sold the estate to Sir William Henry Ashhurst, who in 1786 sold it to William Franks. In 1790 it was purchased by William Wroughton who sold it in 1796 to John Henry Warre.

At about this time the name of the estate was changed to Belmont, and John Warre's widow sold it early in the nineteenth century to John Kingston of Oakhill. He sold it in 1813 to Thomas Harvey, who died at Belmont in 1819, when it was sold under his will to Mr. Goodhart, from whom it passed shortly after to Job Raikes. He sold it in 1826 to David Bevan who died there in December 1846, a week after suffering injuries during a fire at the house. The house passed to his son Robert Cooper Lee Bevan. He sold it to Henry Alexander, who died there in 1861 when it was sold to Charles Addington Hanbury.

== Heddon Court ==
By the 1890s the house was known as Heddon Court.

== Heddon Court School ==
At some time in the 1920s, Heddon Court School moved to the site from Hampstead.

Under headmaster Henry Frampton Stallard in the 1920s, Heddon Court School, like many English preparatory schools, had a strong sporting ethos and when the poet John Betjeman applied for a job teaching English there, some time after Stallard had left, he had to bluff familiarity with the rules of Cricket in order to get the job. His interview was recalled in his poem "Cricket Master". According to John Bale and former pupils, Betjeman then began a programme of converting "athletes to aesthetes" which caused the school's sporting results to "plummet". In the year he was there he got drunk, participated in pranks and rescued a boy whose leg had got stuck in boards at the bottom of the swimming pool. He found a kindred spirit in the new headmaster John Humphrey "Huffy" Hope, a Communist who had taught at Eton and also disliked sport. According to one source, he entered the classroom through the window, and lay on the floor to teach "to make sure he's got control." The author Gavin Maxwell was a pupil during Stallard's time and the artist Ben Nicholson was there during the 1910s.

Tubular bells at Christ Church, Cockfosters, form part of a monument to pupils of the school killed during the First World War.

The school closed in 1933 when it was merged with Horton Preparatory School at Ickwell Bury in Bedfordshire. The building was later demolished and the site used for housing after the Piccadilly line arrived in the area and Cockfosters station was opened in 1933. Heddon Court Avenue is named in memory of the house.
