= William Henry Ashurst (judge) =

English judge (1725–1807)

Sir William Henry Ashurst (or Ashhurst) (1725–1807) was an English judge.

== Early life ==
Ashurst belonged to the Lancashire family, the Ashursts of Ashurst or Ashurst. One of his ancestors was Henry Ashurst, the philanthropist, and another was lord mayor of London in 1693. Sir William Ashurst was born in Ashurst, near Wigan, 26 January 1725, and was educated at Charterhouse.

== Career ==
Ashurst was admitted of the Inner Temple on 19 Jan. 1750. He practised for some years as a special pleader; and Mr. Justice Buller was one of his pupils. He was called to the bar on 8 February 1754, and was made a serjeant in 1770. On 25 June of the same year, on the removal of Sir William Blackstone to the Common Pleas, he succeeded him as a judge of the King's Bench, in which court Lord Mansfield then held undisputed sway. Mr. Justice Ashurst's judgments, which are reported in Loffts and Douglas's 'Reports' and Chitty's 'Practice Cases,' are remarkable for their clearness and good sense. A contemporary writer thus describes his qualities as a judge: 'Sir William Ashurst is a man of liberal education and enlarged notions. His language has no peculiar neatness nor brilliancy, but it is perspicuous, pointed, and clear. He reasons logically, and knows well how to winnow the chaff and eloquence from argument and law.'

Mr. Justice Ashurst is best remembered by his charge to the grand jury of Middlesex on 10 Nov. 1792. The charge was delivered shortly after the massacres of September in France, and at a time when the name of reform had become odious to a multitude of Englishmen. Mr. Justice Ashurst, giving expression to the fears of the hour respecting the French Revolution, attacked as 'absurd, nonsensical, and pernicious' the doctrines of its English admirers. 'There is no nation in the world that can boast of a more perfect system of government than that under which we live. . . . I trust that your minds will be impressed with these ideas, and that you will be assiduous in supporting our present form of government.' This charge was printed by the Society for preserving Liberty and Property against Republicans and Levellers as an opportune warning to the nation. It called forth several replies, one of the best-known being a pamphlet 'Justice to a Judge.' It also elicited from Bentham one of his most incisive pamphlets, 'Truth versus Ashhurst,' which was written in 1792, but was not printed until August 1823. Bentham's strictures are somewhat too sweeping. Sir William Ashurst was an admirer of what Bentham terms in this pamphlet 'the rubbish' of the common law. But he co-operated in some degree with Mansfield in introducing a spirit of equity into its administration. His personal appearance is recorded in the lines attributed to Erskine —

Judge Ashhurst with his lanthorn jaws
Throws light upon the English laws.

== Later life ==
Being highly esteemed as a lawyer, Sir William Ashurst was twice one of the commissioners entrusted with the great seal, which he held from 9 April 1783 to 23 December of the same year and from 15 June 1792 to 28 Jan. 1793. In 1786, Ashurst sold his home at Mount Pleasant (later known as Belmont) to William Franks. On 9 June 1799 he resigned his office, and retired to his house at Waterstock, in Oxfordshire, where he died on 5 November 1807.

== References and sources ==
"Ashurst, William Henry (1725-1807)" . Dictionary of National Biography. London: Smith, Elder & Co. 1885–1900.
