= Christ Church, Cockfosters =

Coordinates: 51.6515°N 0.1509°W

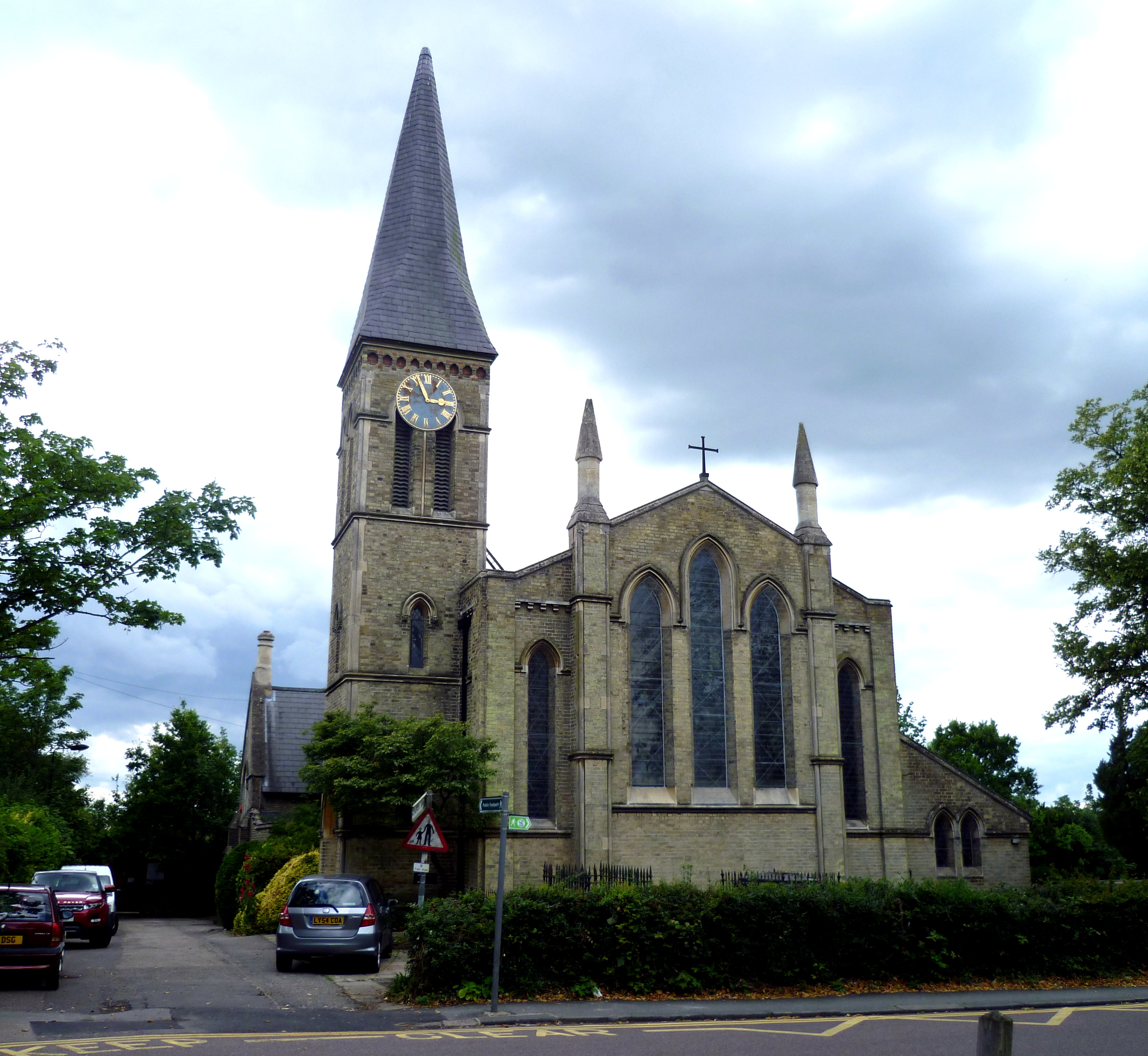
- Christ Church, Cockfosters
- Location: Chalk Lane, Cockfosters, EN4 9JQ
- Country: England
- Denomination: Church of England
- Churchmanship: Conservative Evangelical
- Website: www.cockfosters.church

History
- Dedicated: 9 April 1839

Administration
- Diocese: Diocese of London

Clergy
- Vicar: Jon Tuckwell

Christ Church, Cockfosters, is a conservative evangelical Anglican church in Chalk Lane, in the north London suburb of Cockfosters. It is about 200m from Cockfosters Underground station.

== History ==
The church was founded by Robert Cooper Lee Bevan, a member of the family who also founded Barclays Bank, and the funerary monument to the Bevan family is the largest single monument in the graveyard at Christ Church. The church was designed by Henry Edward Kendall, and consecrated by Bishop Blomfield on 9 April 1839.

In 1898, the church was renovated and redesigned by Sir Arthur Blomfield. Tubular bells were later installed as part of a monument to former pupils of Heddon Court School who died during the First World War.

St Paul's Church, Hadley Wood, opened in 1911, initially as an offshoot of Christ Church, but became independent in 2000.

== Gallery ==
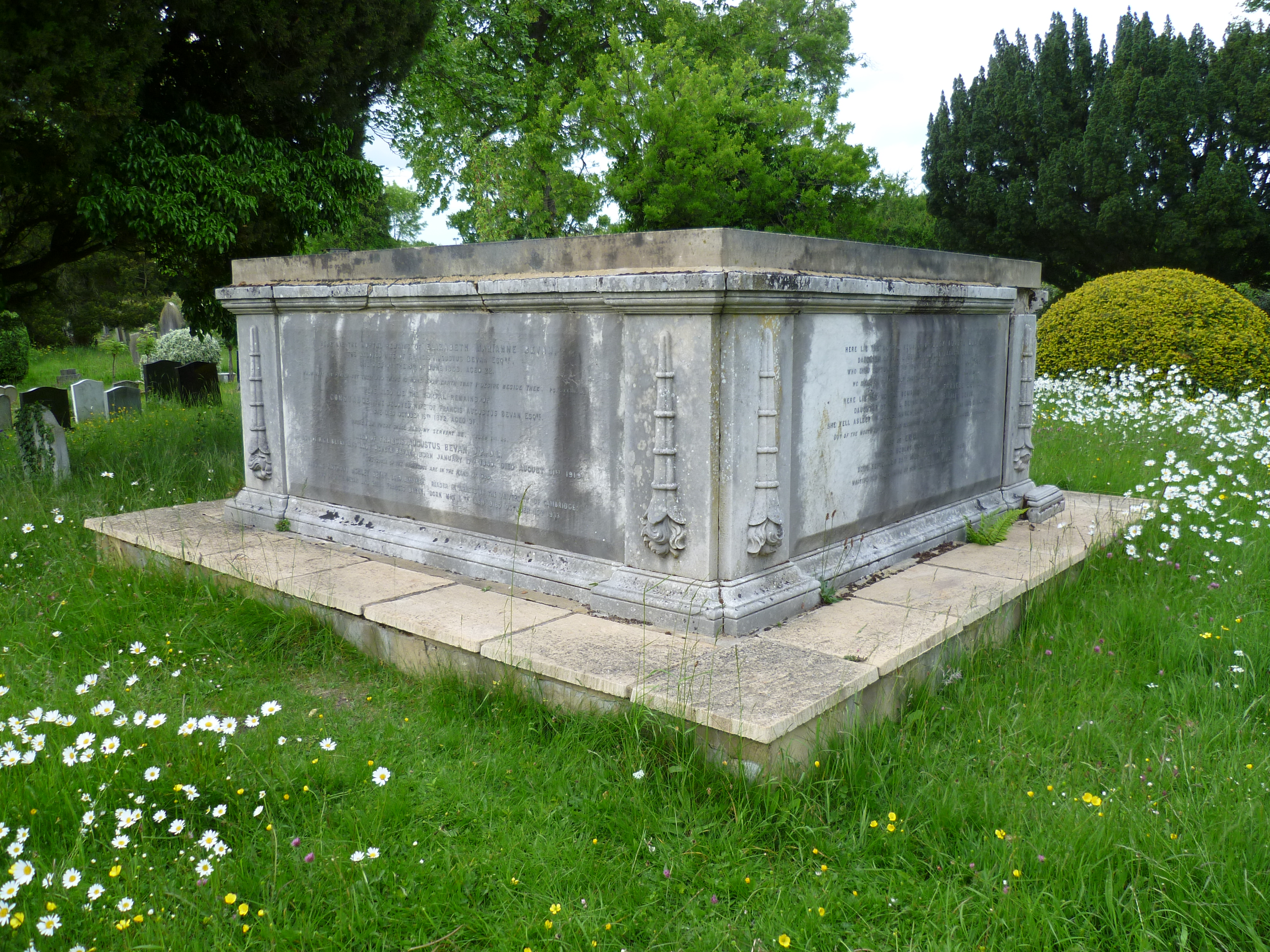
The Bevan family grave.

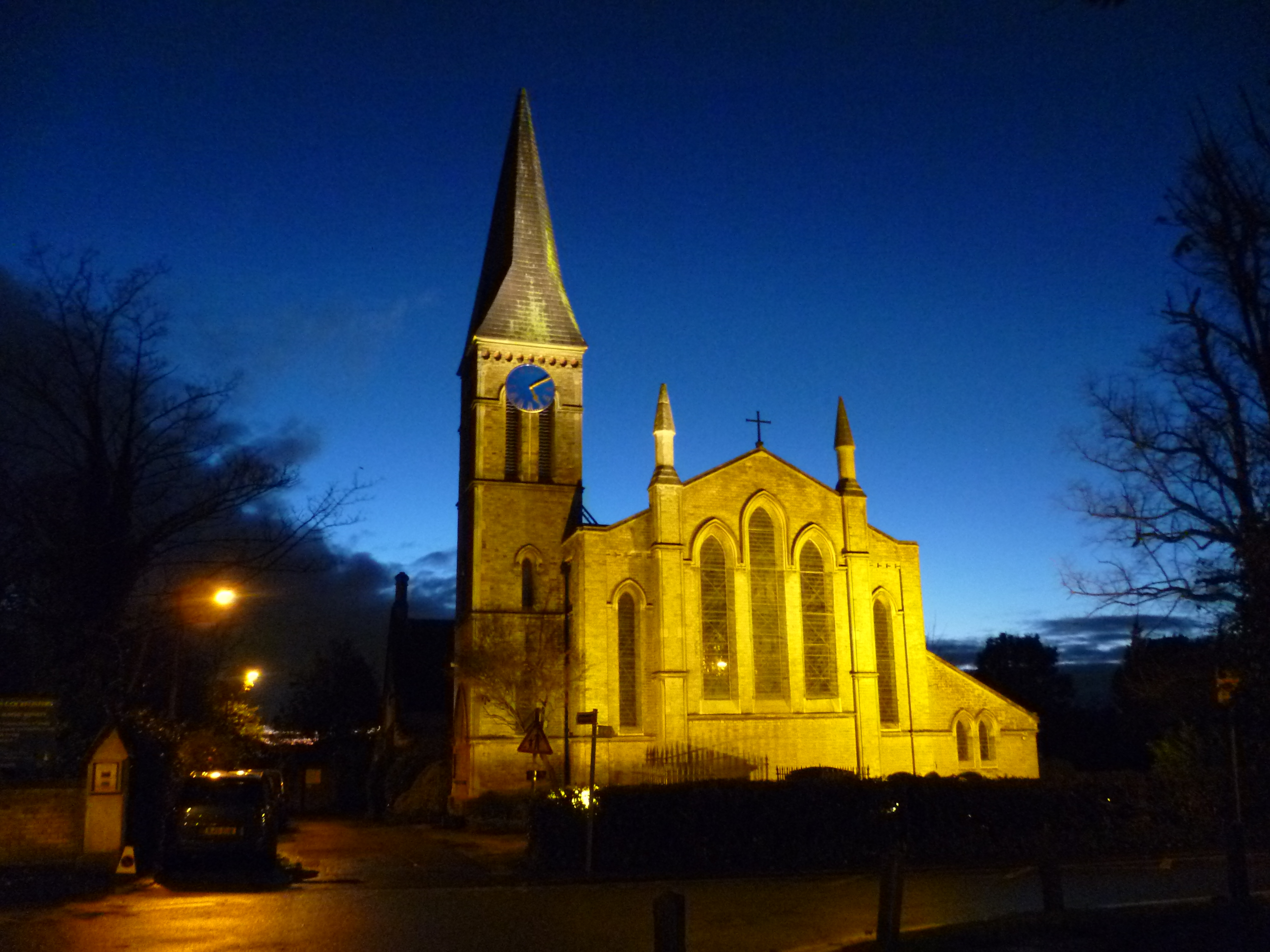
Night view.

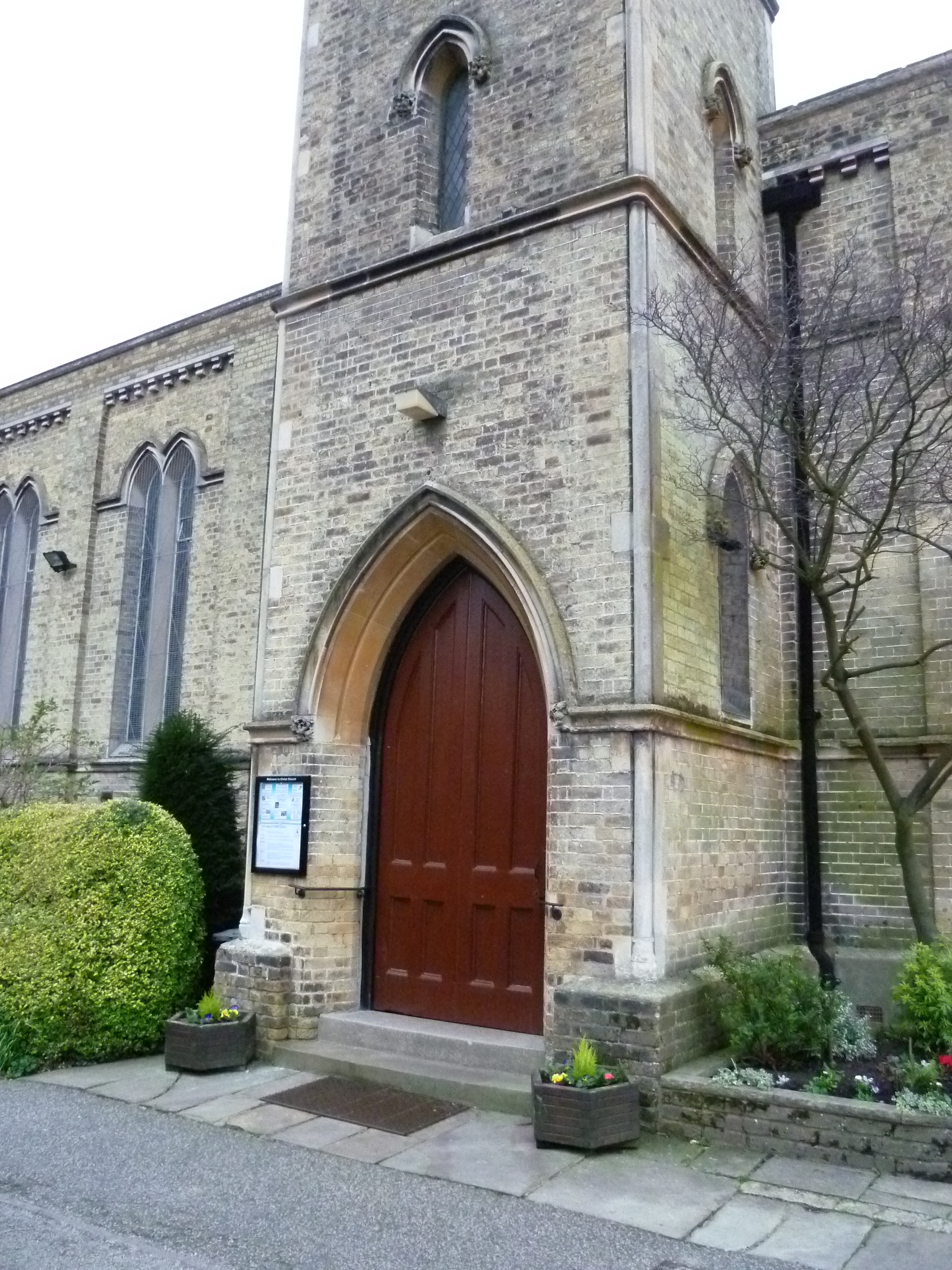
Main entrance.

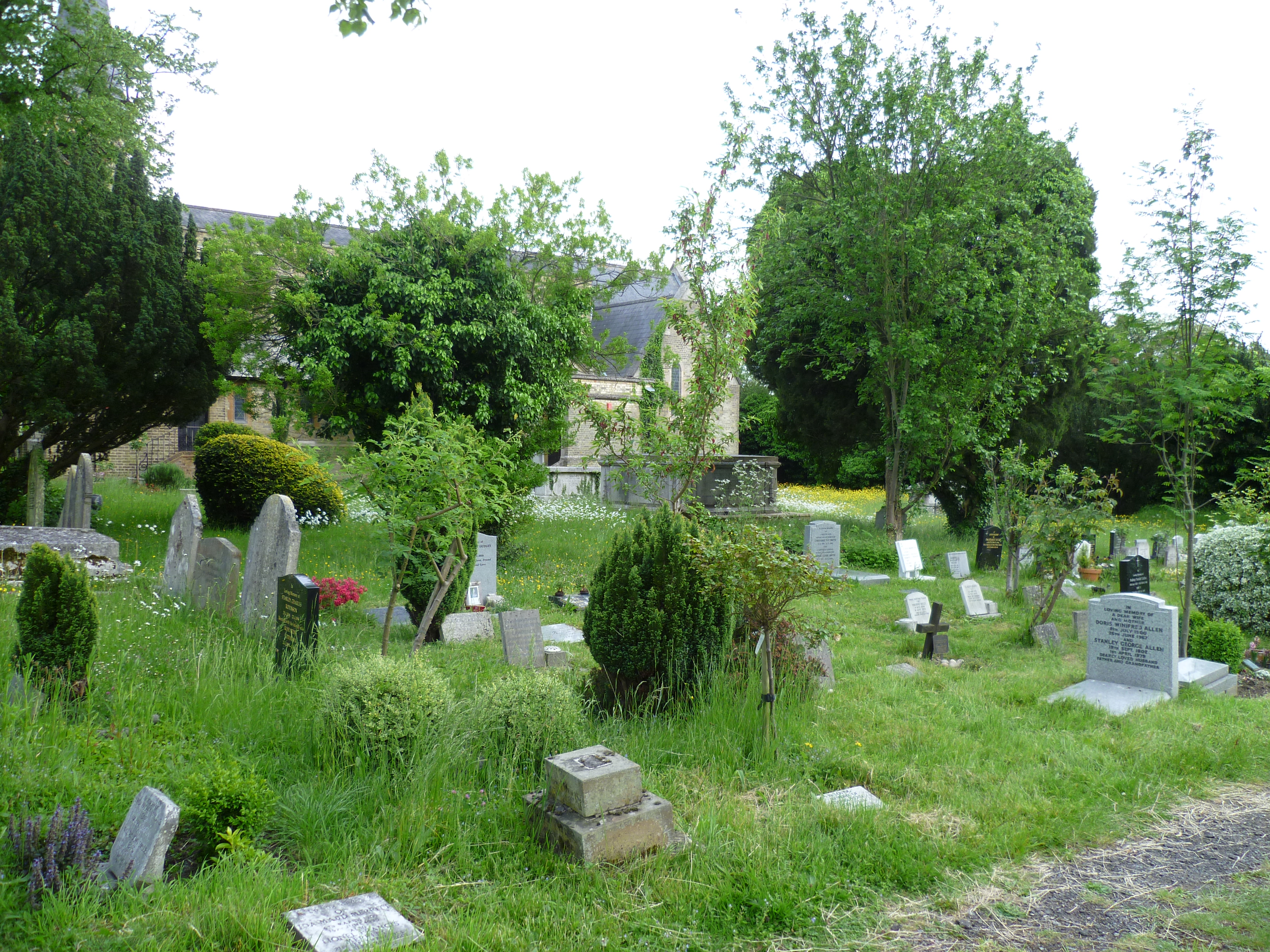
The graveyard.
