= Silvanus Bevan (1743–1830) =

British banker (1743–1830)

- Born: 3 October 1743; London, England
- Died: 1830 (aged 86–87)
- Occupation: Banker
- Spouses: Isabella Wakefield; Louisa Kendall
- Children: 7 sons, including David Bevan
- Parent(s): Timothy Bevan; Elizabeth Barclay
- Relatives: Silvanus Bevan (1661–1725) (paternal grandfather); Silvanus Bevan (1691–1765) (uncle)

Silvanus Bevan (a.k.a. Silvanus Bevan III) (3 October 1743 – 25 January 1830) was a British banker.

== Early life ==
He was born on 3 October 1743 in Plough Court Pharmacy, Lombard Street, London, the son of Timothy Bevan (1704–1786, brother of Silvanus Bevan) and his wife Elizabeth Barclay (1714–1745). His father hired the English educator, historian, and Quaker Robert Proud to tutor Silvanus and his brother.

== Career ==
In 1767, he joined his uncle James Barclay, and in 1776, their firm became "Barclay, Bevan and Bening". He was a sleeping partner in the Barclay and Perkins brewery (Anchor Brewery) at Southwark.

== Personal life ==
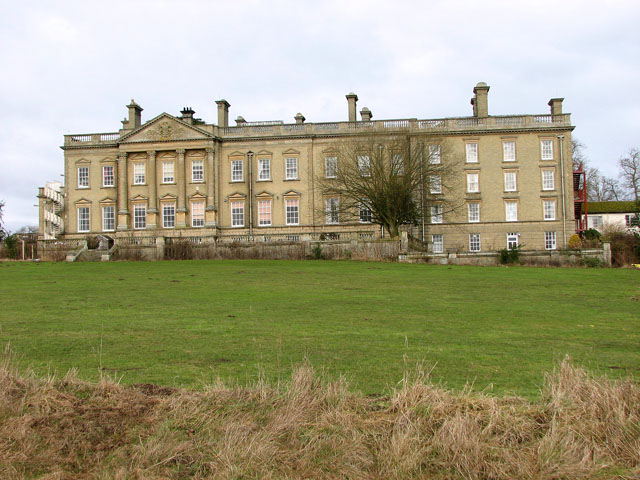
Riddlesworth Hall.

On 10 April 1769, he married Isabella Wakefield (1752–1769), the daughter of Edward and Isabella Wakefield, from an old Westmorland Quaker family. She died of fever on 17 November 1769, aged 17.

On 23 September 1773, Bevan married Louisa Kendall (1748–1838), the daughter of Henry Kendall, a banker, of Lincoln's Inn Fields. They had seven sons. On marrying a non-Quaker, he was expelled from the Society of Friends. In 1783 he bought Swallowfield Park in Berkshire, from John Dodd for £20,000, and then sold the house in about 1788. In 1789 he bought Riddlesworth Hall. In 1814 he moved to Fosbury House, Hungerford, Wiltshire. He also had houses at 31 Gloucester Place, London and Collingwood House, 127 Marine Parade, Brighton.

Silvanus and Louisa Bevan had seven children:

- David Bevan (1774–1846)., married Favell Bourke Lee (1780–1841)
- Henry Bevan (1776–1860), married Harriet Droz (1783–1852).
- Rev. Frederick Stephen Bevan (1779–1859), married Ann Elizabeth Buxton (1782–1848).
- Charles Bevan (1781–1832), married Mary Johnstone (1789–1854).
- Rev. George Bevan (1782–1819), married Anne Buchanan (1782–1831).
- Robert Bevan (1784–1854), married Mary Peele Taylor (1786–1853).
- Richard Bevan (1788–1870), married Charlotte Hunter (1801–1835) then Sarah Dewar (−1883). He was a banker based in Brighton.

He died in 1830.
