= Robert Proud =

English educator, Quaker and historian

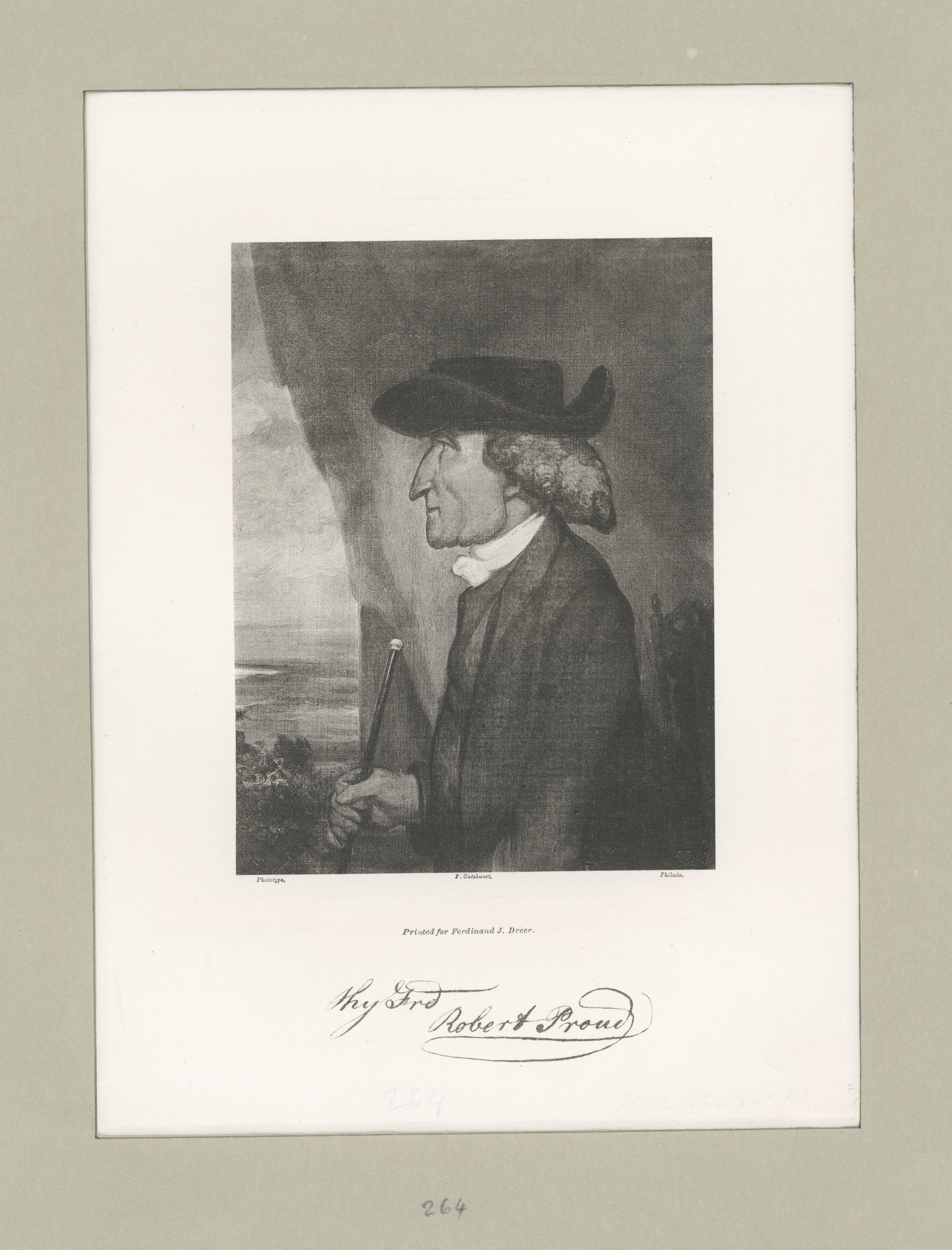
- Born: May 10, 1728; Yorkshire, England
- Died: July 7, 1813 (aged 85); Philadelphia, Pennsylvania, United States
- Occupations: Quaker educator and historian of the Province of Pennsylvania
- Parent(s): William and Ann Proud

Robert Proud (1728–1813) was an English educator, Quaker and historian known for his research and writing about the Province of Pennsylvania (also known as the Pennsylvania Colony).

Dubbed "Pennsylvania's first historian" Proud was a Loyalist during the American Revolution, and completed much of his writing while living in poverty after emigrating from England to Philadelphia.

== Formative years ==
Born on May 10, 1728, in Yorkshire, England, Robert Proud was a son of Ann and William Proud, a prosperous farmer. Initially reared "on a leasehold near the North-Riding market-town of Thirsk," according to historian J. H. Powell, he was educated in a primary school in the community of his birth, but was then sent at the age of 18 by his parents to David Hall's Quaker boarding school at Skipton. While there, he trained intensively in classical studies. After completing his education in 1750, he worked briefly as a bookkeeper in London before being persuaded by Dr. John Fothergill to pursue studies in botany and pharmacopoeia, which he did. In order to support himself, he secured work as a tutor for several families, including that of Timothy Bevan of Hackney, with whom he resided for a number of years before emigrating from England in late winter of 1758.

Shortly after arriving in the Province of Pennsylvania (also known as the Pennsylvania Colony), he settled in Philadelphia, where he launched a private school for boys dedicated to the instruction of Latin. When that school failed two years later, he was hired to teach at The Friends School in that city in September 1761. Also known as The Friends Academy, The Public School or the Penn Charter School, it is known today as the Friends Select School. He ultimately rose to the level of master teacher. He was elected to the revived American Philosophical Society in 1768.

But even after having some success as an educator, Proud's life remained far from secure. Per Powell, during "his first twenty years [in Philadelphia, Proud] lived in fourteen different Quaker homes, dependent upon Friends for his bed and board". Persecuted politically during the American Revolution for his Loyalist sympathies toward England and religiously for his pacifist views as a Quaker — the latter of which may have been kindled by the decreased Quaker population and resulting decline of Quaker influence, according to historian Robert F. Oaks — Proud attempted to gain a more secure financial footing by establishing another enterprise of his own — a London-based business venture launched in partnership with his brother in September 1770 — but it also failed quickly. Briefly moderating his "views on 'the American cause'", according to Kara Flynn, Special Collections cataloguer at Haverford College, he "returned to his Loyalist roots" following a series of revolts by Patriot sympathizers. As Philadelphia became an increasingly dangerous place for him, he resigned from his teaching position in 1775, opting to remain in seclusion until 1780 to avoid arrest and preserve his own life. He used this time to write poetry, translate Latin works into English, and perform significant research that would later form the backbone of his two-volume The History of Pennsylvania in North America.

Leaving seclusion sometime around 1788, Proud returned to teaching at the Friends School and described his educational philosophy that same year via his Some Short Notes & Memoranda by R.P. Philadelphia, Respecting the Scholastic Education of Youth Among Friends, according to biographer Melissa Hozik:

"To render the Minds of youth attentive to Instruction & to habituate them to a decent & agreeable Deportment, in improved Society, are great Points in Education; but too little attended to by many ... the Education of youth ought to be considered, as it really is, a Religious Duty & Concern, as being introductory to the great Interests of Virtue & Happiness. ... "

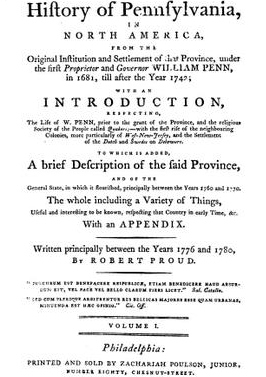
Title page from Robert Proud's The History of Pennsylvania in North America, Vol. 1 (1897).

Resigning from teaching again in 1793 in order to shepherd his The History of Pennsylvania in North America through its printing and marketing phases, he was able, in 1797, to release his first volume, which presented a biographical sketch of William Penn and also covered Pennsylvania's religious history from 1681 to 1709.

After soliciting and securing financial support from his students and other members of Philadelphia's Quaker community in order to continue his historical research and writing, he was then able to release the second volume of this work the following year. Volume II covered the periods of 1709 to 1742 and 1760 to 1770.

According to curators at the Historical Society of Pennsylvania, Proud's two-volume set was "unsuccessful, due to its Loyalist leanings, and some very strong inaccuracies.

== Later years, death and legacy ==
Locked into a lifelong struggle with poverty, Proud finally retired to a life of seclusion. Having never married, he died in Philadelphia on July 7, 1813.

In addition to the criticism and lack of financial success which his works suffered during his lifetime, Proud's The History of Pennsylvania in North America has also been criticized by latter day historians. According to Powell, "the first observation that occurs to one on reading Proud's History" is that "there was much material available which he chose not to consult, and much that he did use was of a highly partisan nature."

Also, from the perspectiveof Robert Bray Wingate, the former rare books librarian at the Pennsylvania State Library:

Proud had available to him historical resources which he chose to ignore and much of his work is marred by partisanship and bias. A pacifist of staunchly conservative outlook ... he remained throughout his life a Tory of deepest hue. Never an egalitarian, he was dismayed by the sweeping social and economic changes wrought by American independence and never reconciled himself to the objectives of the new republic. Although well-trained as a scholar, there is much truth to Proud's own assertion that his History was imperfect, deficient, and not what he had hoped for after some twenty years of gathering material and writing amidst gnawing privation as a schoolmaster.

But, added Wingate, despite these problems, "Proud exemplifies the dissenting commentator whose political criticisms and trenchant observations of the passing scene remain perennially interesting and valuable to the historian".

== Publications (abridged list) ==
- Proud, Robert. The History of Pennsylvania in North America from the Original Institution and Settlement of That Province Under the First Proprietor and Governor William Penn, in 1681, till after the Year 1742, Vol. I. Philadelphia, Pennsylvania: Zachariah Poulson Jr., 1797. OCLC 970881579
- Proud, Robert. The History of Pennsylvania in North America from the Original Institution and Settlement of That Province Under the First Proprietor and Governor William Penn, in 1681, till after the Year 1742, Vol. II. Philadelphia, Pennsylvania: Zachariah Poulson Jr., 1798. OCLC 970881579

=== Selected excerpts from the author's works ===
- "The wisdom of former ages, when transmitted, in writing, to posterity, in an inestimable treasure; but the actions of illustrious and virtuous persons, in the same manner exhibited, is still more beneficial: by the former our judgments are rightly informed, and our minds brought into a proper way of thinking; by the latter we are animated to an imitation; and while the excellency of noble examples is displayed before our understandings, our minds are inspired with a love of virtue. This appears to be the office of history; by which every succeeding age may avail itself of the wisdom, and, even, of the folly, of the preceding, and become wiser and happier by a proper application. Through this medium when we view the conduct of those great men of antiquity, who have benefited mankind, in their most essential interests, they appear frequently to have been actuated by motives, the most disinterested, and attended with a satisfaction more than human! — Adversity, which refines men, and renders them more fit to benefit the human race, is a frequent concomitant of worthy minds; and apparent success doth not always immediately attend noble and just designs:— When a Socrates is put to death, wisdom and truth seem to suffer; and when an Aristides is exiled, justice appears to be in disgrace. But virtue is its own reward, and depends not on the fluctuating opinions of mortals, not on the breath of popular applause; which is often on the side of error, and entirely opposite to the real interest of its votaries." — Robert Proud, The History of Pennsylvania in North America from the Original Institution and Settlement of That Province Under the First Proprietor and Governor William Penn, in 1681, till after the Year 1742, Vol. I (Introduction: Part the First, p. 1)
