= Quaker Social Action =

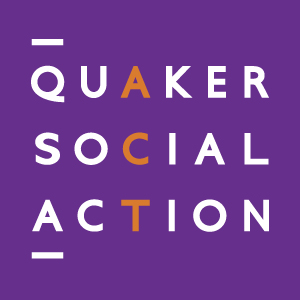
- QSA's logo since 2015.
- Abbreviation: QSA
- Predecessor: Bedford Institute Association
- Formation: 1867
- Type: Charity
- Purpose: To support people on low incomes in east London and beyond.
- Headquarters: Bethnal Green
- Location: East London
- Board of directors: Judith Moran
- Staff: 35
- Website: quakersocialaction.org.uk

Quaker Social Action (QSA) is an independent charity working in east London and beyond to tackle poverty.

QSA runs practical projects to support people facing poverty:

- Down to Earth: a helpline for people unable to afford funerals
- Made of Money: financial wellbeing courses, workshops and resources
- This Way Up: a life coaching and mindfulness course
- Move on Up: supported housing for young adult carers in London
- Cook Up: a kitchen space for people who need one
- Turn a Corner: a mobile library for people affected by homelessness
- The Money Guiders England Network: a network for professionals providing money guidance, in partnership with the Money and Pensions Service

QSA also works with Big Local community projects in London, as a Local Trusted Organisation.

The charity is led by its director Judith Moran. Though not religious, QSA adheres to Quaker values.

== History ==
Founded as the Bedford Institute Association (BIA) in 1867, its original purpose was to commemorate the life and continue the work of the Quaker silk merchant and philanthropist of Spitalfields, Peter Bedford (1780–1864).

As the BIA entered the 20th century, its eight branches across east and South London worked to nurture healthy citizens. They became places of refuge from the slums of East End streets, offering activities, summer camps, and outings for unemployed men and women with children.

The new post-war flats, new jobs, and new social legislation gave east Londoners an improved standard of living based on rights rather than charity. The welfare state made some of the BIA's work unnecessary, but after the war, the high density housing and broken community ties sowed the seeds of problems for the future.

In the 1970s and 1980s, economic crises and changes to welfare policy created a new, spiraling rise in social deprivation and poverty. In the late 1980s, the BIA began to grow rapidly once again in response. To reflect a more modern image and purpose, the BIA was renamed as Quaker Social Action and incorporated as a limited company (as well as a charity) in 1998.
