= Silvanus Bevan =

Welsh apothecary

- Born: 1691; Swansea, Wales
- Died: 1765 (aged 73–74); Hackney
- Resting place: Bunhill Fields
- Occupation: Apothecary
- Spouses: Elizabeth (Quare) Bevan; Martha Heathcote
- Parent(s): Silvanus Bevan (1661–1727); Jane (Phillips) Bevan
- Relatives: Daniel Quare (father-in-law); Timothy Bevan (brother)

Silvanus Bevan FRS (1691 – 8 June 1765) was an apothecary, who founded the London firm of Allen & Hanburys.

== Biography ==
=== Early life ===
Silvanus Bevan was born in 1691 in Swansea, into a prosperous Welsh Quaker family. His father (1661–1725), a burgess was also called Silvanus. The elder Silvanus owned property at Penclawdd Llanrhidian, and various farms and lands were bought including Gwen-y-Goredd, Tyry Gorge. His mother was Jane Bevan (née Phillips). He had a younger brother, Timothy (1704-1786), and six sisters.

He left Swansea as a young man, and moved to Cheapside, in London.

=== Career ===
He obtained his "Freedom" from the Worshipful Society of Apothecaries in 1715 having served his seven years' apprenticeship with Thomas Mayleigh. He established his Pharmacy at Number Two Plough Court, Lombard Street in one of whose rooms Alexander Pope, the poet, had been born in 1688. William Cookworthy was one of his apprentices.

His business prospered, and in 1725 he was joined by his younger brother, Timothy (1704–1786). Timothy continued the Plough Court Pharmacy after his brother's retirement, and was succeeded by his son, Joseph Gurney Bevan (1753–1814). In the nineteenth century, under William Allen and the Hanbury family, Allen & Hanburys became one of the leading pharmaceutical companies in London.

In 1725, he was elected a Fellow of the Royal Society, on the proposal of Isaac Newton. In 1743 his letter entitled “An Account of an Extraordinary Case of the Bones of a Woman Growing Soft and Flexible”, was printed in their Philosophical Transactions. It describes his findings having performed a post-mortem examination.

He was a skilled carver of ivory and several busts of well-known men are still in existence (he sent one to Lord Cobham, when he was seeking likenesses for statues for his garden at Stowe House.

After he retired his interest in Welsh antiquities brought him into contact with Richard Morris. There are references to him in the Morris Letters He was described as being a dilettante, a collector of fossils, curios, books and paintings and a keen gardener. Although he spoke Welsh badly, in 1762 he was elected a member of the Cymmrodorion.

=== Family ===
On 9 November 1715 he married Elizabeth, the daughter of Daniel Quare, the royal clockmaker, at a Friends' meeting-house in the City. His wedding was attended by Sarah, Duchess of Marlborough, Lord Finch, Lady Cartwright, William Penn, the Venetian ambassador and his wife. Elizabeth died soon after their marriage in giving birth to a son, who lived but a few hours. Silvanus subsequently married Martha Heathcote, the daughter of Gilbert Heathcote (1664-1719), a Quaker physician to King William III of England. They had no children.

His brother Timothy and his wife Elizabeth Barclay (1714–1745) had two sons, Joseph Gurney Bevan and Silvanus Bevan (1743-1830).

=== Death ===
He died in Hackney on 5 June 1765, and was buried at the Bunhill Fields burial-ground.

=== Notes ===
There were three prominent Silvanus Bevans in the family.

- Silvanus (I) (1661–1725) the father of the subject of this entry was a burgess of the City of Swansea.
- Silvanus (II) (1691–1765) the apothecary, and
- Silvanus (III) (1743–1830), son of Timothy Bevan, the brother of Silvanus Bevan (II), was one of the founders of Barclay's Bank and partner of Thrale's Anchor Brewery. He was a grandson of Silvanus (I) and the great grandfather of Robert Polhill Bevan, the artist.
