= Edwyn Bevan =

British philosopher and historian (1870–1943)

Edwyn Robert Bevan OBE, FBA (15 February 1870 in London – 18 October 1943 in London) was a versatile British philosopher and historian of the Hellenistic world.

== Life ==
Edwyn Robert Bevan was the fourteenth of sixteen children of Robert Cooper Lee Bevan, a partner in Barclays Bank, and his second wife Emma Frances Shuttleworth, daughter of Philip Nicholas Shuttleworth, Bishop of Chichester. He was educated at Monkton Combe School and at New College, Oxford.

Bevan held an academic position at King's College London as Lecturer in Hellenistic History and Literature. The Arabist Anthony Ashley Bevan was his brother, the conspiracy theorist Nesta Helen Webster was his youngest sister and the artist Robert Polhill Bevan a cousin.

He married Mary Waldegrave, daughter of Granville Waldegrave, 3rd Baron Radstock in 1896 and they had two daughters, Christina (born March 1897, died 1981) and Anne (born March 1898, died 1983).

Bevan's name is given in a list of staff at Wellington House, Britain's War Propaganda Bureau, in a report from February 1916. His role was "Reader & Reporter German papers"

Bevan was awarded an honorary doctorate from St. Andrews in 1922 and an honorary D.Litt. from Oxford in 1923. In 1942 he became a Fellow of the British Academy.

== Autochromes of Christina ==
A series of early colour photographs Mervyn O'Gorman took in 1913 of Bevan's oldest daughter Christina Elizabeth Frances Bevan dressed in red were included in the Drawn by Light exhibition in 2015 by the National Science and Media Museum and gained press and social media attention.

== Works ==
- The House of Seleucus (1902) 2 volumes Volume I Volume II
- The Prometheus Bound of Aeschylus, rendered into English verse 1902
- Jerusalem under the High Priests: Five Lectures on the Period between Nehemiah and the New Testament (1904)
- The Seven against Thebes of Aeschylus, rendered into English verse 1912
- Indian Nationalism : An Independent Estimate (1913)
- Stoics and Sceptics (1913)
- Brothers all: The War and the Race Question (1914)
- Peace with Empire: The Problem (1915)
- German War Aims (1917)
- The Method in the Madness: A fresh Consideration of the Case between Germany and Ourselves (1917)
- Ancient Mesopotamia: The Land of The Two Rivers (1918)
- German Social Democracy During the War(1918)
- The German Empire of Central Africa as the Basis of a New German World Policy (1918) with Emil Zimmermann
- Hellenism and Christianity (1921)
- The Hellenistic Age (1923) with J. B. Bury, E. A. Barber, W. W. Tarn
- The House of Ptolemy (1927)
- The World of Greece and Rome (in Benn's Sixpenny Library) (1927)
- Later Greek Religion (1927)
- Sibyls and Seers: A Survey of Some Ancient Theories of Revelation and Inspiration (1928)
- The Legacy of Israel (1928) editor with Charles Singer
- Thoughts on Indian Discontents (1929)
- Jerusalem under the high priests: five lectures on the period between Nehemiah and the New Testament (1930)
- The hope of a world to come; underlying Judaism and Christianity (1930)
- The Poems of Leonidas of Tarentum (1931)
- Christianity (1932) Home University Library of Modern Knowledge
- Our Debt to the Past (1932) with others
- After Death (1934) with others
- Symbolism and Belief (1938) Gifford Lectures
- Holy Images: An Inquiry Into Idolatry and Image-Worship in Ancient Paganism and in Christianity (1940)
- Christians in a World at War (1940)
