= List of wardens of New College, Oxford =

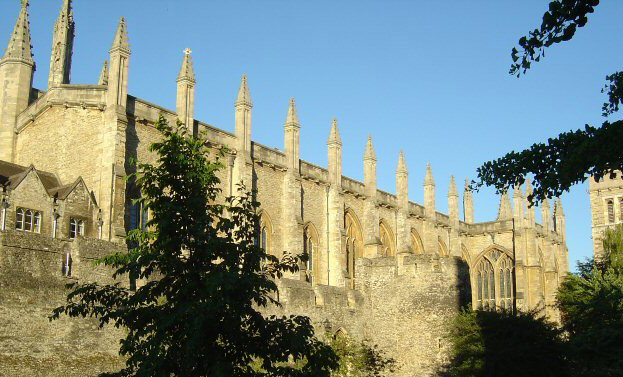
New College, Oxford

The warden of New College, Oxford, is the college's principal. The officeholder is responsible for the college's academic leadership, chairing its governing body, and representing it in the outside world.

- 1379–1389: Nicholas Wykeham
- 1389–1396: Thomas Cranley
- 1396–1403: Richard Malford
- 1403–1429: John Bowke or Bouke
- 1429–1435: William Estcourt
- 1435–1454: Nicholas Ossulbury
- 1454–1475: Thomas Chaundler
- 1475–1494: Walter Hyll
- 1494–1520: William Porter
- 1520–1521: John Rede
- 1521–1526: John Young
- 1526–1542: John London
- 1542–1551: Henry Cole
  - In 1547, Thomas Harding was named Warden by King Edward VI
- 1551–1553: Ralph Skinner
- 1553–1573: Thomas Whyte, or White
  - In 1556, John Harpsfield was elected Warden but did not assume the office.
- 1573–1599: Martin Culpepper
- 1599–1613: George Ryves
- 1613–1617: Arthur Lake
- 1617–1647: Robert Pinck
- 1647–1648: Henry Stringer
- 1649–1658: George Marshall (intruded by the Parliamentary Commissioners)
- 1658–1675: Michael Woodward
- 1675–1679: John Nicholas
- 1679–1701: Henry Beeston
- 1701–1703: Richard Traffles
- 1703–1712: Thomas Brathwait
- 1712–1720: John Cobb
- 1720–1724: John Dobson
- 1725–1730: Henry Bigg
- 1730–1740: John Coxed
- 1740–1764: John Purnell
- 1764–1768: Thomas Hayward
- 1768–1794: John Oglander
- 1794–1822: Samuel Gauntlett
- 1822–1840: Philip Nicholas Shuttleworth
- 1840–1860: Rev. David Williams
- 1860–1903: James Edwards Sewell
- 1903–1924: William Archibald Spooner
- 1925–1940: Herbert Fisher
- 1944–1958: Alic Halford Smith
- 1958–1976: Sir William Hayter
- 1976–1985: Arthur Hafford Cooke
- 1985–1996: Harvey McGregor QC
- 1996–2009: Alan Ryan
- 2009–2016: Sir Curtis Price
- 2016–2026: Miles Young
- 2026-present: Sir Robin Niblett
