= Frances Bevan =

British translator and poet

Emma Frances Bevan (1827–1909) was a British translator and poet.

She was the daughter of Philip Nicholas Shuttleworth, Bishop of Chichester.

She was the second wife of the banker, Robert Cooper Lee Bevan, with whom she had nine children:

- Ada Frances Bevan (15 June 1857 – 24 March 1861)
- Professor Anthony Ashley Bevan (19 May 1859 – 16 October 1933) Lord Almoner's Professor of Arabic, Trinity College, Cambridge. Orientalist and one of the dozen most learned Arabists of the world.
- Hubert Lee Bevan (9 October 1860 – 29 November 1939)
- Millicent Ada Bevan (5 January 1862 – 7 August 1946)
- Gladys Mary Bevan (4 December 1864 – 15 October 1947)
- Gwendolen Bevan (11 November 1865 – 24 October 1937) who married Ion Grant Neville Keith-Falconer Lord Almoner's Professor of Arabic, Trinity College, Cambridge.
- Edwyn Robert Bevan (15 February 1870 – 18 October 1943), philosopher
- Enid Bertha Bevan (5 April 1872 – 13 June 1954)
- Nesta Helen Bevan (14 August 1875 – 7 May 1960), controversial author who revived conspiracy theories about the Illuminati
