= John Dobson =

John Dobson may refer to:

== People ==
- John Dobson (academic) (1690–1724), warden of New College, Oxford
- John Dobson (architect) (1787–1865), British architect
- John Dobson (amateur astronomer) (1915–2014), popularizer of astronomy and the Dobsonian telescope
- John Dobson (Canadian politician) (1824–1907), Canadian senator
- John Dobson (Northern Ireland politician) (1929–2009), Northern Irish politician
- John Dobson (priest) (born 1964), British priest and Dean of Ripon
- John Dobson (rugby union, born 1886) (1886–1936), Scotland international rugby union player
- John Dobson (rugby union coach), South African rugby union coach

== Places ==
- John Dobson and McFadden Parks, a combined park system in Chehalis, Washington
