= Henry Ford (disambiguation) =

Henry Ford (1863–1947) was an American industrialist, the founder of the Ford Motor Company.

Henry Ford may also refer to:

== People ==
=== Politicians ===
- Henry Ford (Michigan legislator) (1825–1894), Michigan state senator
- Henry Ford (MP for Weymouth) (1386–1397), member of parliament for Weymouth
- Henry Ford (Tiverton MP) (1617–1684), English politician
- Henry Harrison Ford (1844–1887), member of the Texas House
- Henry P. Ford (1837–1905), mayor of Pittsburgh, Pennsylvania, from 1896 to 1899

=== Illustrators ===
- Henry Ford (illustrator) (1828–1894), American illustrator
- Henry Justice Ford (1860–1941), British illustrator

=== Others ===
- Henry Ford II (1917–1987), American business executive, grandson of Henry Ford
- Henry Ford (defensive back) (born 1931), American football defensive back
- Henry Ford (defensive lineman) (born 1971), American football defensive lineman
- Henry Ford (professor) (1753–1813), professor of Arabic and principal of Magdalen Hall, University of Oxford
- Henry Jones Ford (1851–1925), political scientist
- E. B. Ford (1901–1988), also known as Henry Ford, British ecological geneticist

== Other uses ==
- The Henry Ford, museum and historical Greenfield Village
- Henry Ford Hospital, hospital founded with money from Henry Ford
- Henry Ford College, college in Dearborn Michigan
- Henry Ford Health, Metro Detroit
- Henry Ford II High School, Sterling Heights, Michigan
- Henry Ford Bridge, Los Angeles County, Southern California

== See also ==
- Harry Ford (disambiguation)
- Henri Ford, Haitian-American pediatric surgeon
