= Robert Cooper Lee Bevan =

English banker

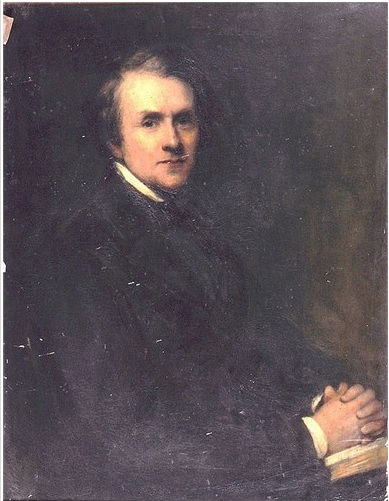
- Robert Cooper Lee Bevan by William Boxall (painted c. 1850)
- Born: 8 February 1809; Walthamstow, East London, England
- Died: 22 July 1890 (aged 81)
- Occupation: Banker
- Spouse(s): Agneta Elizabeth Yorke; Emma Frances Shuttleworth
- Children: 16, including Francis Bevan, Anthony Ashley Bevan, Edwyn Bevan, and Nesta Helen Webster
- Parent(s): David Bevan; Favell Bourke Lee
- Relatives: Silvanus Bevan (paternal grandfather); Timothy Bevan (paternal great-grandfather); Favell Lee Mortimer (sister)

Robert Cooper Lee Bevan (8 February 1809 – 22 July 1890) was a British banker. He served as a senior partner of Barclays Bank.

== Early life ==
Robert Cooper Lee Bevan was born on 8 February 1809 at Hale End, Walthamstow. He was the eldest son of fellow banker David Bevan (1774–1846), and his heiress wife, Favell Bourke Lee (1780–1841). He was educated at Harrow School and Christ Church, Oxford. Robert Cooper Lee Bevan, was named for the affection of his maternal grandfather, Robert Cooper Lee, Crown Solicitor-General of Jamaica, and later Barrister of London, England.

== Career ==
Bevan served as a senior partner of Barclays Bank.

== Personal life ==
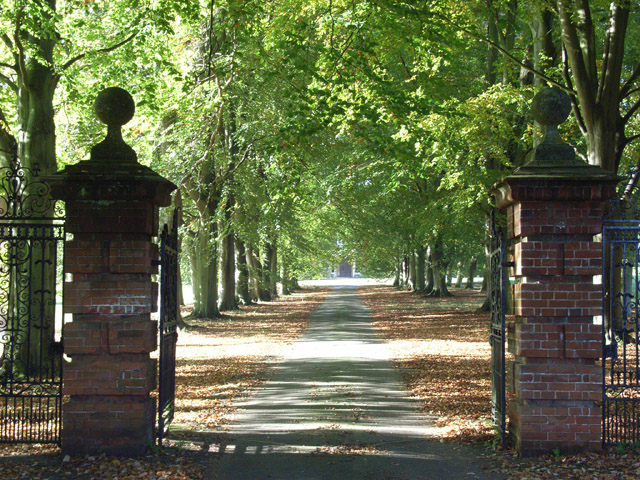
Driveway, Fosbury House

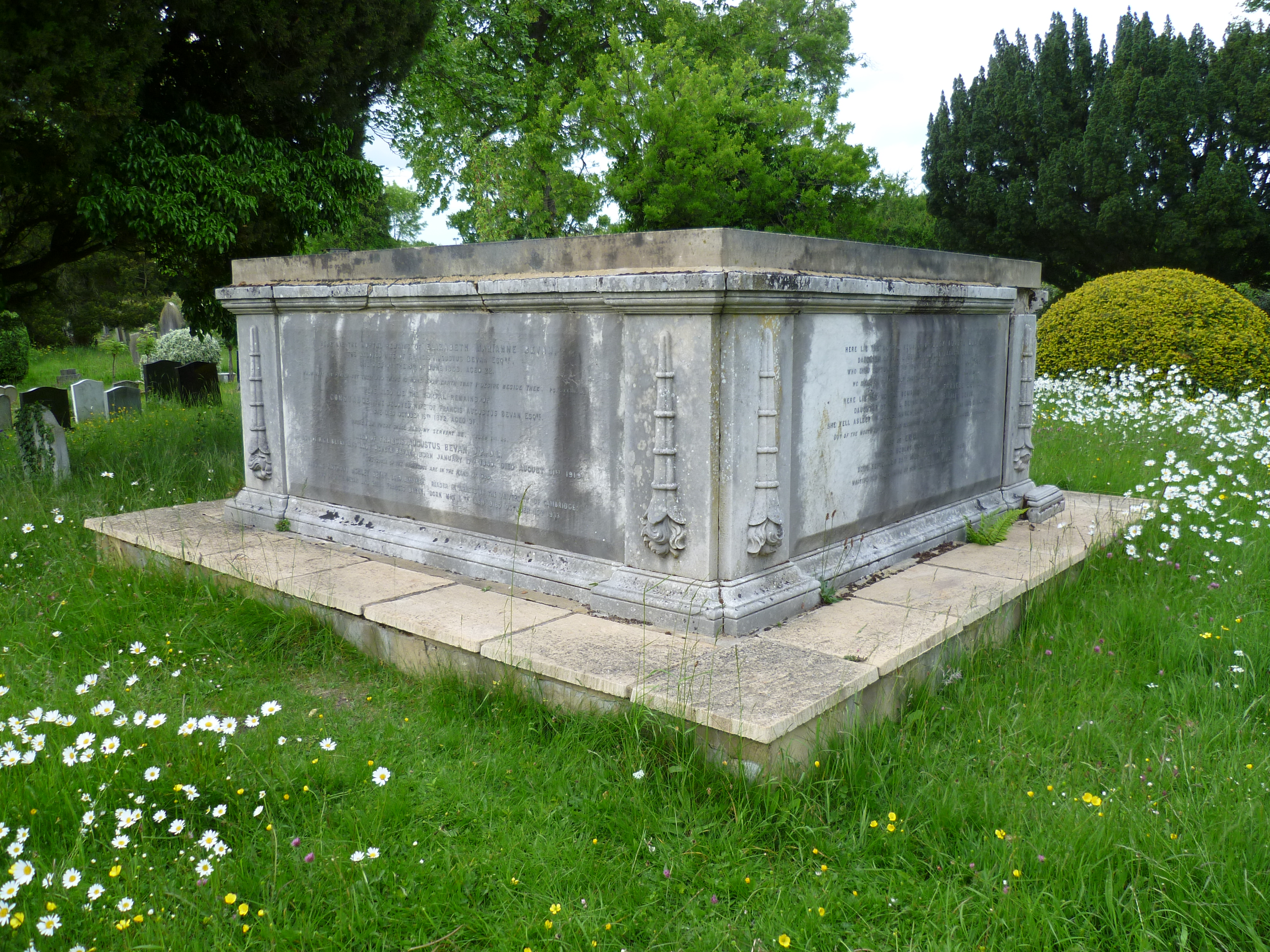
The Bevan family vault at Christ Church, Cockfosters

He resided at Fosbury House, Wiltshire, and Trent Park, London. His father bought Trent Park as a gift to celebrate his marriage to Agneta Elizabeth Yorke.

He founded Christ Church, Cockfosters, and the funerary monument to the Bevan family is the largest single monument in the graveyard of that church. The inscription to him reads, "He lived soberly, righteously and godly in this present world". His eldest son Sydney was the joint first baptism (along with Cecil, the son of his brother-in-law Augustus Henry Bosanquet) in the new church, nine days after its consecration.

He had 16 children, seven with his first wife, Lady Agneta Elizabeth Yorke (1811–51), daughter of Vice-Admiral Hon. Sir Joseph Sidney Yorke and Elizabeth Weake Rattray:

- Sydney Bevan (1838–1901)
- Francis Augustus Bevan (1840–1919), banker, chairman of Barclays Bank from 1896 to 1916.
- Lucy Agneta Bevan (1841–45)
- Alice Lee Bevan (1843–1923)
- Wilfred Arthur Bevan (1846–1905)
- Roland Yorke Bevan (1848–1923), married Agneta Olivia Fitzgerald (1850–1940), daughter of Arthur Kinnaird, 10th Lord Kinnaird
- Edith Agneta Bevan (1850–1929), married William Middleton Campbell

He had a further nine children with his second wife, the translator and poet Emma Frances Shuttleworth, daughter of Philip Nicholas Shuttleworth, Bishop of Chichester:

- Ada Frances Bevan (1857–1861)
- Anthony Ashley Bevan (1859–1933), orientalist
- Hubert Lee Bevan (1860–1939)
- Millicent Ada Bevan (1862–1946)
- Gladys Mary Bevan (1865–1947)
- Gwendolen Bevan (1866–1937), married Ion Keith-Falconer
- Edwyn Robert Bevan, philosopher and historian
- Enid Bertha Bevan (1872–1954)
- Nesta Helen Bevan (1875–1960), controversial author who revived conspiracy theories about the Illuminati

== Brighton Town Mission (Brighton and Hove City Mission) ==
Whilst living in Brighton, Bevan saw the deplorable state of the slums, and being a Christian wanted to "push back the tide of evil and ignorance" in the town.

During the Autumn of 1849 the discussions over some kind of 'mission' for Brighton were coming to a head. It was finally decided that a Town Mission should be established based on the same principles as those of the London City Mission. Men would be employed to go from door to door and they would be paid from funds raised by subscriptions from supporters.

== Land ==
John Bateman in his Great landowners, of 1883, lists Bevan as having:

- In Wiltshire, 2,227 acres (worth 1,679 guineas pa); Berkshire. 956 acres (worth 807 gpa) and Hampshire. 214 acres (worth 160 gpa). At the time parts of Berkshire were islands within Wiltshire. This refers to his Fosbury estate.
- In Middlesex, 469 acres (worth 794 gpa) and Hertfordshire 47 acres (worth 136 gpa). (Trent Park).

Total: 3,913 acres worth 3,576 guineas per annum

== Death ==
He died in 1890.
