= Harry Ford =

Harry Ford may refer to:

- Harry Ford (actor) (born 1987), American actor
- Harry Ford (Australian footballer) (1884–1957), Australian rules footballer
- Harry Ford (baseball) (born 2003), American baseball player
- Harry Ford (footballer, born 1893) (1893–1963), English footballer
- Harry Chapman Ford, American playwright and novelist

== See also ==
- Henry Ford (disambiguation)
