= John Macbride (professor) =

English academic

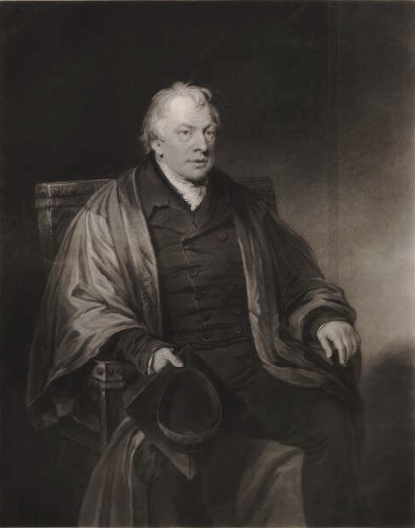
- John Macbride, 1850 engraving
- Born: John David Macbride; 28 June 1778; Plympton St Maurice, Devon
- Died: 24 January 1868 (aged 89); Oxford
- Education: Cheam School, Exeter College, Oxford
- Occupation: academic

John David Macbride (28 June 1778 – 24 January 1868) was an English academic at the University of Oxford in the 19th century.

== Life and career ==
John David Macbride, the son of John MacBride (a naval officer and politician), was born in Plympton St Maurice, Devon, on 28 June 1778. He studied at Cheam School and Exeter College, Oxford, becoming a fellow of the college in 1800. He married in 1805, giving up his fellowship, and began to study law; he obtained his Bachelor of Civil Law and Doctor of Civil Law degrees in 1811. In 1813, he was appointed to two university positions that he was to hold until his death in 1868: Lord Almoner's Reader in Arabic (reflecting his interest in oriental studies) and Principal of Magdalen Hall, Oxford. (Both positions had previously been held by Henry Ford.) As principal, he oversaw the move from alongside Magdalen College to a new site formerly occupied by Hertford College, which had become defunct. The move was completed in 1822, Magdalen Hall flourished under Macbride, and it became a college of the university (as the reborn Hertford College) in 1874. His writings included The Mohammedan Religion Explained (1857) and theological lectures. He died in Oxford on 24 January 1868.
