= Henry Ford (professor) =

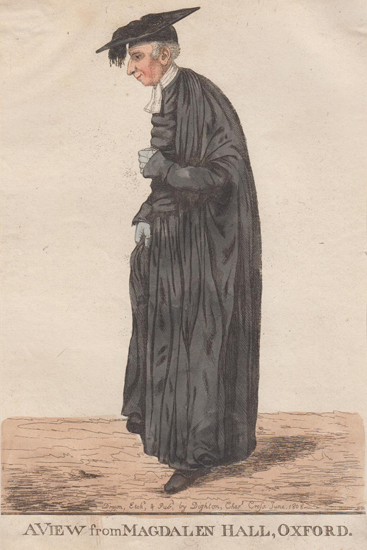
Henry Ford, depicted in 1808

Henry Ford (c.1753 – 26 July 1813) was an academic at the University of Oxford, who held the positions of Lord Almoner's Professor of Arabic (1780–1813) and Principal of Magdalen Hall, Oxford (1788–1813).

== Life and career ==
Henry Ford, from Cranbrook in Kent, joined the University of Oxford on 9 July 1776, at the age of 23, matriculating as a member of Pembroke College. He later became a member of Christ Church and obtained his Bachelor of Arts degree in 1780. He was appointed Lord Almoner's Professor of Arabic straight after obtaining his degree. He was not the only candidate: William Jones, a lawyer and linguist, also applied. He had a reputation as a radical, and although Ford was "a comparative nonentity" (in the words of Jones's biographer), he had the advantage of having married the niece of a bishop, (Note: Jones's biographer names the bishop as Robert Lowth (Bishop of London and a former Bishop of Oxford); contemporary reports state that Ford's wife's uncle was John Butler, at that time Bishop of Oxford and later Bishop of Hereford.) and so "nepotism and politics triumphed".

Ford obtained his Master of Arts degree in 1783. When Matthew Lamb, the Principal of Magdalen Hall, resigned in 1788, Ford was his successor. He obtained a doctorate in civil law in the same year: it was customary at the time for the heads of colleges and halls to have a doctoral degree. He then "retired as much as he could from the public view", wrote one historian of Hertford College (a successor institution to Magdalen Hall), adding that "it was his excessive shyness that gained for him a certain notoriety and a place among the early Oxford caricatures."

In addition to his Oxford positions, he was also an ordained priest in the Church of England. He was a residentiary canon of Hereford Cathedral, rector of Cradley and vicar of Woolhope and Fownhope in Herefordshire. These were positions given to him by his wife's uncle, John Butler, the Bishop of Hereford. After Butler's death in 1802, Ford (who was the bishop's executor) arranged for a memorial tablet to be placed in the cathedral.

Ford died on 26 July 1813, and was buried in Hereford Cathedral; a memorial to him was placed in the cloisters. He was succeeded in his positions as Lord Almoner's Professor and Principal of Magdalen Hall by John Macbride. Alumni Oxonienses, a 19th-century register of students and academics at the university, records that Ford had two sons, Charles and Frederick, who both studied at Oxford. He and his wife, Mary, also had a daughter, Anna Louisa. Mary died on 18 December 1831 "in her 80th year".

An obituary in The Gentleman's Magazine praised Ford's "great and varied acquirements in general science", his "profound knowledge of Oriental literature" and his "unaffected piety, gentleness, and benevolence." It also described him as "an affectionate husband and tender father."
