= John Dobson (academic) =

John Dobson, DD (30 May 1690, in Cliddesden –10 December 1724, in Oxford) was Warden of New College, Oxford, from 1720 until his death.

Dobson was educated at New College where he graduated BA in 1711, MA in 1714 and BD in 1721.

Academic offices
Preceded by John Cobb	Warden of New College, Oxford; 1720–1724	Succeeded by Henry Bigg
