= Abraham Wheelocke =

English linguist 1593–1653

Abraham Wheelock (1593 in Whitchurch, Shropshire – 25 September 1653) was an English linguist. He was the first Cambridge professor of Arabic.

== Cambridge ==
He graduated MA from Trinity College, Cambridge in 1618, and became Fellow of Clare College, Cambridge in 1619. He was the first Adams Professor of Arabic at the University of Cambridge, from around 1632. According to Robert Irwin, he regarded it as part of his academic duty to discourage students from taking up the subject. Thomas Hyde was one of his pupils.

== Clergyman ==
He was ordained deacon in the Church of England by the Bishop of London in 1619 and priest by the Bishop of Peterborough in 1622. He served as vicar of St Sepulchre's, Cambridge, from 1622 to 1642, of Passenham, Northamptonshire, in 1626–27, and of Middleton, Norfolk.

== Librarian ==
Wheelock was appointed librarian of the "Public Library" (i. e. Cambridge University Library) in 1629, and was also Reader in Anglo-Saxon. In 1632 he oversaw the transfer of Thomas van Erpe's collection of oriental books and manuscripts to Cambridge University Library from the family of the 1st Duke of Buckingham who had bought it before the latter's death in 1628. This brought with it the collection's first book in Chinese.

== Editor ==
Wheelock produced the editio princeps of the Old English version of Bede's Ecclesiastical History of the English People and the Anglo-Saxon Chronicle (1643–1644). In the same work he published an important edition – and the first in England – of Bede's Ecclesiastical History in its original Latin text, opposite the Old English version, along with Anglo-Saxon laws. Many of the notes in this consist of the Old English homilies of Aelfric of Eynsham, which Wheelocke translated himself into Latin. In the following year (1644), the London publisher Cornelius Bee put out another, enlarged edition, which included an updated version of William Lambarde's legal text "Archaionomia." This text was probably a collaboration between Wheelock and his friend Sir Roger Twysden.

Quatuor evangeliorum domini nostri Jesu Christi versio Persica Syriacam & Arabicam suavissimè redolens was a trilingual version of the Four Gospels, published in the same year as the London Polyglot, to which he also contributed.

== Personal life ==
Wheelocke married in 1632 Clemence Godd. He was believed by Venn to be probably father of Ralph and Gregory Wheelock (sic) who respectively entered Cambridge in 1645 and 1649.
