= Richard Traffles =

Richard Traffles DCL (15 August 1648, in Winchester – 30 June 1703, in Oxford) was an English educator in the first decade of the 18th Century.

Traffles graduated BCL from New College, Oxford in 1673. He was warden of his college from 1701 until his death.

Academic offices
Preceded by Henry Beeston	Warden of New College, Oxford; 1703–1712	Succeeded by Thomas Brathwait
