= Thomas Jarrett =

English churchman and orientalist

Thomas Jarrett, DD, (1805–1882) was an English churchman and orientalist.

== Life ==
He was educated at St. Catharine's College, Cambridge, where he graduated B.A. in 1827 as thirty-fourth wrangler, and seventh in the first class of the classical tripos. In the following year he was elected a Fellow of his college, where he stayed as classical and Hebrew lecturer until 1832.

In 1832 he was presented by his college to the rectory of Trunch in Norfolk. In 1831 he was elected Sir Thomas Adams's Professor of Arabic, and held the chair until 1854, when he was appointed Regius Professor of Hebrew and canon of Ely Cathedral. He died at Trunch rectory on 7 March 1882.

== Works ==
He knew at least twenty languages, and taught Hebrew, Arabic, Sanskrit, Persian, Gothic, and indeed almost any language for which he could find a student. He spent much time on Romanisation of oriental languages according to a system of his own; and also in promoting a system of printing English with diacritical marks to show the sound of each vowel without changing the spelling of the word.

He published in 1831 an Essay on Algebraic Development, intended to illustrate and apply a system of algebraic notation submitted by him to the Cambridge Philosophical Society in 1827, and printed in the third volume of their Transactions. It contained a suggestion for the notation for a factorial, written n as opposed to n! (a notation of German origin), that had wide currency in the nineteenth century.

In 1830 he published ‘Grammatical Indexes to the Hebrew Text of Genesis;’ in 1848, a ‘Hebrew-English and English-Hebrew Lexicon;’ in 1857, ‘The Gospels and Acts so printed as to Show the Sound of each Word without Change of Spelling,’ a work which was intended to illustrate his ‘New Way of Marking Sounds of English words without Change of Spelling,’ published in 1858; in 1866, an edition of Virgil with all the quantities marked; in 1875, ‘Nalopākhyānam,’ or the Sanskrit text of the Story of Nala transliterated into Roman characters; and in 1882, the ‘Hebrew Text of the Old Covenant printed in a modified Roman Alphabet.’ He also transliterated editions, which were never published, of the Rāmāyana, the Shāhnāmah, and the Korān.

He bequeathed his library to St Catharine's College, where it remains.
