= Thomas Robinson (orientalist) =

English clergyman and academic

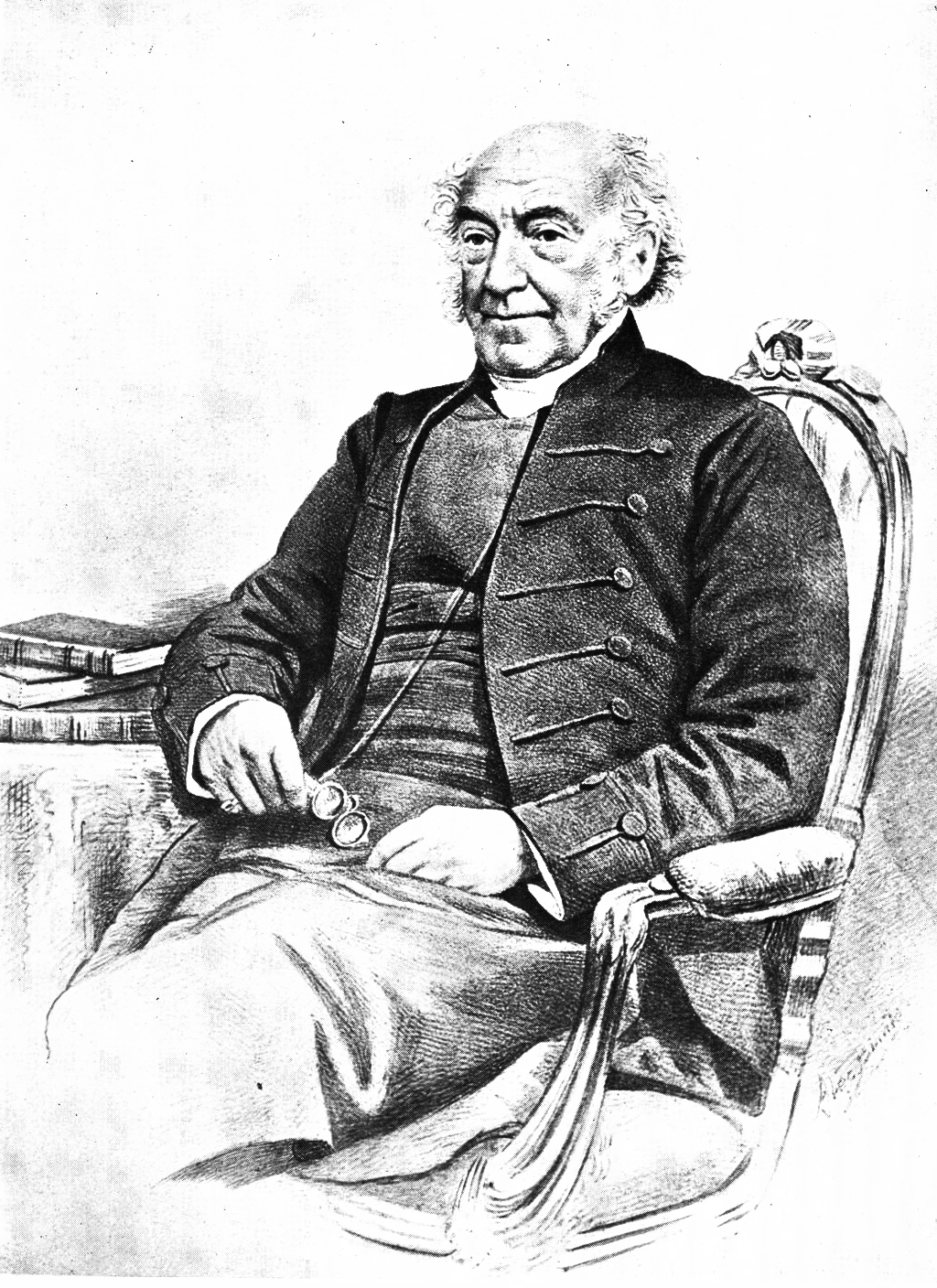

Thomas Robinson (1790 – 17 May 1873) was an English churchman and academic who became the Archdeacon of Madras in 1826, Lord Almoner's Professor of Arabic at Cambridge in 1837, and Master of the Temple in 1845.

== Life ==
Robinson was the youngest son of Thomas Robinson (1749–1813). He was educated at Rugby School and Trinity College, Cambridge, where he matriculated as a scholar in 1809. In 1810 he gained the first Bell scholarship, and he graduated B.A. in 1813. He proceeded M.A. in 1816, was admitted ad eundem at Oxford in 1839, and graduated D.D. in 1844.

Robinson was ordained deacon in 1815 and priest in 1816, then went out as a missionary to India. He was appointed chaplain on the Bombay establishment, and was stationed first at Seroor and then at Poonah. He attracted the notice of Thomas Fanshaw Middleton, and in 1825 he was appointed chaplain to Middleton's successor, Reginald Heber. He was present at Trichinopoly on 2 April 1826, when Heber was drowned, and preached and published a funeral sermon. Before the end of 1826, he was made Archdeacon of Madras.

In 1837 Robinson was appointed Lord Almoner's Professor of Arabic at the University of Cambridge. In 1845 he was elected Master of the Temple, and in 1847 was appointed Prebendary of Mora with a stall in St Paul's Cathedral. In 1853 was presented to the rectory of Therfield, Hertfordshire. In the following year, he was made canon of Rochester Cathedral, resigning his professorship at Cambridge. He gave up his rectory in 1860, and the mastership of the Temple in 1869, being succeeded by Charles John Vaughan.

Robinson died at the Precincts, Rochester, on 13 May 1873.

== Works ==
Early in his time in India, Robinson was engaged in translating the Old Testament into Persian. The first part, The History of Joseph from the Pentateuch, appeared in 1825, and two others, Isaiah to Malachi and Chronicles to Canticles, in 1837 and 1838. Other works were:

- Discourses on the Evidences of Christianity, Calcutta, 1819, dedicated to Thomas Fanshaw Middleton.
- The Last Days of Bishop Heber, Madras, 1829.
- On the Study of Oriental Literature, 1838, inaugural lecture delivered on 22 May 1838.
- The Character of St. Paul the Model of the Christian Ministry, Cambridge, 1840.
- The Twin Fallacies of Rome, Supremacy and Infallibility, London, 1851.

== Family ==
Robinson was first married in 1816, to Esther Eleanor, by Charles Simeon. She died at Therfield on 3 July 1855. He was survived by his wife Mary, and by two sons who were clerics, Charles Edward Ricketts (born in Madras 1829, died 1881), and Thomas (died 1895) who was a Cambridge Apostle and Head Master of Potsdam School, Jamaica.

== Notes ==
This article incorporates text from a publication now in the public domain: Lee, Sidney, ed. (1897). "Robinson, Thomas (1790-1873)". Dictionary of National Biography. Vol. 49. London: Smith, Elder & Co.
