= Tripos =

Bachelor's exam or course at Cambridge

Cambridge Tripos
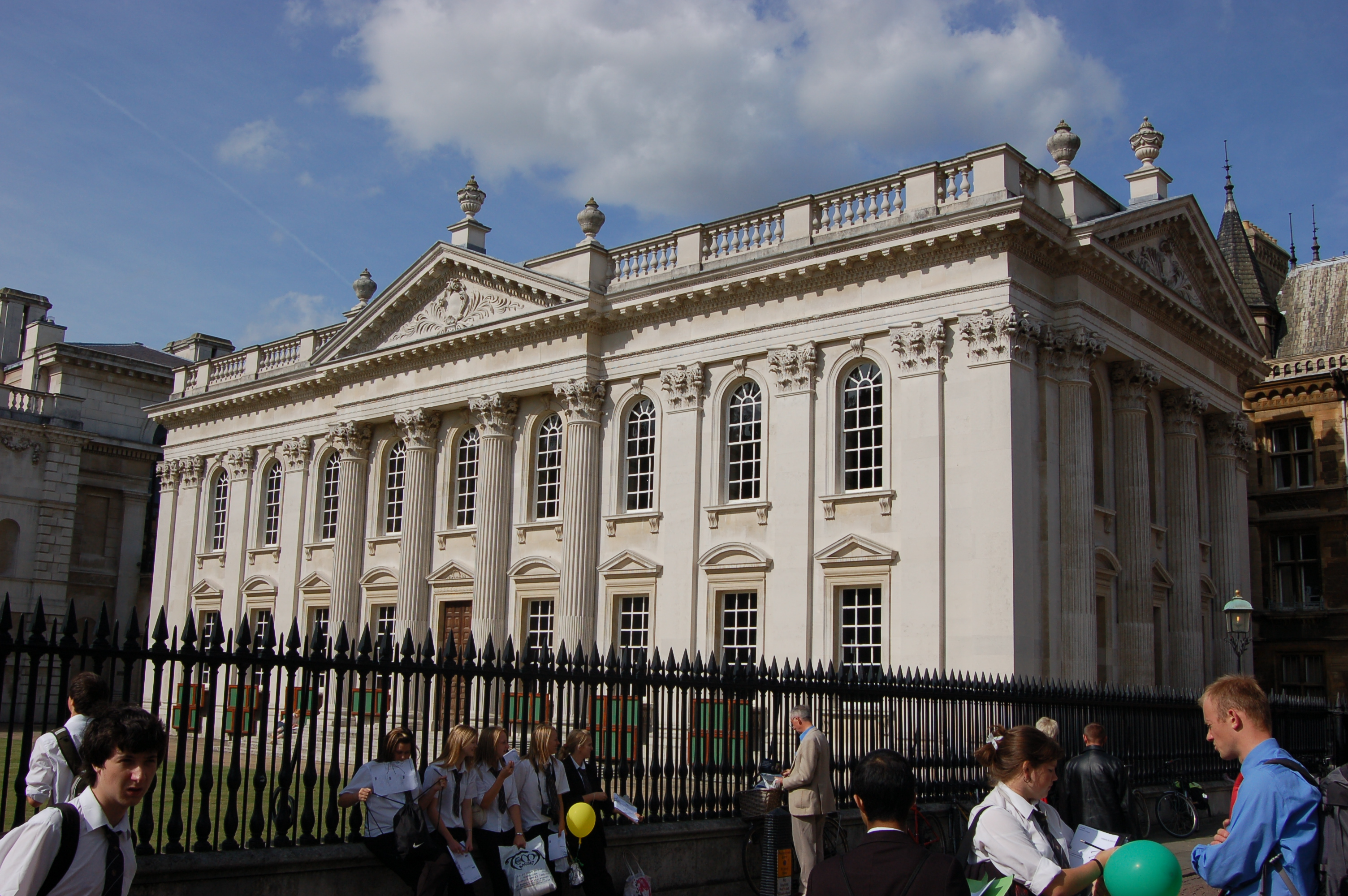
- Tripos results were posted publicly outside departments and the Senate House until 2021.
- Type: Bachelor's degree (BA); Master's degree (MSci, MEng, MMath)
- Duration: 3 or 4 years
- Regions: University of Cambridge
- Languages: English language
- Website: www.camdata.admin.cam.ac.uk/structure-undergraduate-courses-cambridge

A Tripos (/ˈtraɪpɒs/, plural 'Triposes') is an academic examination that originated at the University of Cambridge in Cambridge, England. The term encompasses both the examinations required for undergraduate students to qualify for a bachelor's degree and the courses of study undertaken to prepare for such examinations. Undergraduate students studying mathematics, for instance, ultimately take the Mathematical Tripos, students of English literature take the English Tripos, and Students interested in sciences take the Natural Sciences Tripos.

== Etymology ==
The word has an obscure etymology, but may derive from the three-legged stools, known as tripods, on which candidates once sat during oral examinations. According to an unverified tradition, students are said to have received one leg of a stool during each of their three years of exams, and the complete stool upon graduation. Another tradition holds that the name derives from the three brackets printed on the back of the voucher.

== History ==
Initially, the only way to obtain an honours degree at Cambridge was the Mathematical Tripos examination. John Jebb proposed reforms in 1772, but implementation was hindered by factors including the lack of expertise in smaller colleges across a broader range of subjects. Classed examinations in law were introduced in 1816 by James William Geldart, who was then Regius Professor of Civil Law. Although a classical tripos was created in 1822, it was open to only those who already had high honours in mathematics or those who were the sons of peers. This restriction ended around 1850, and triposes in the moral sciences and natural sciences were introduced in the 1860s. From Easter 2023, "overall degree classifications" were introduced to the Tripos system bringing Cambridge in line with other British universities.

The origin and evolution of the Cambridge Tripos can be found in William Clark's Academic Charisma and the Origin of the Research University.

== Structure ==
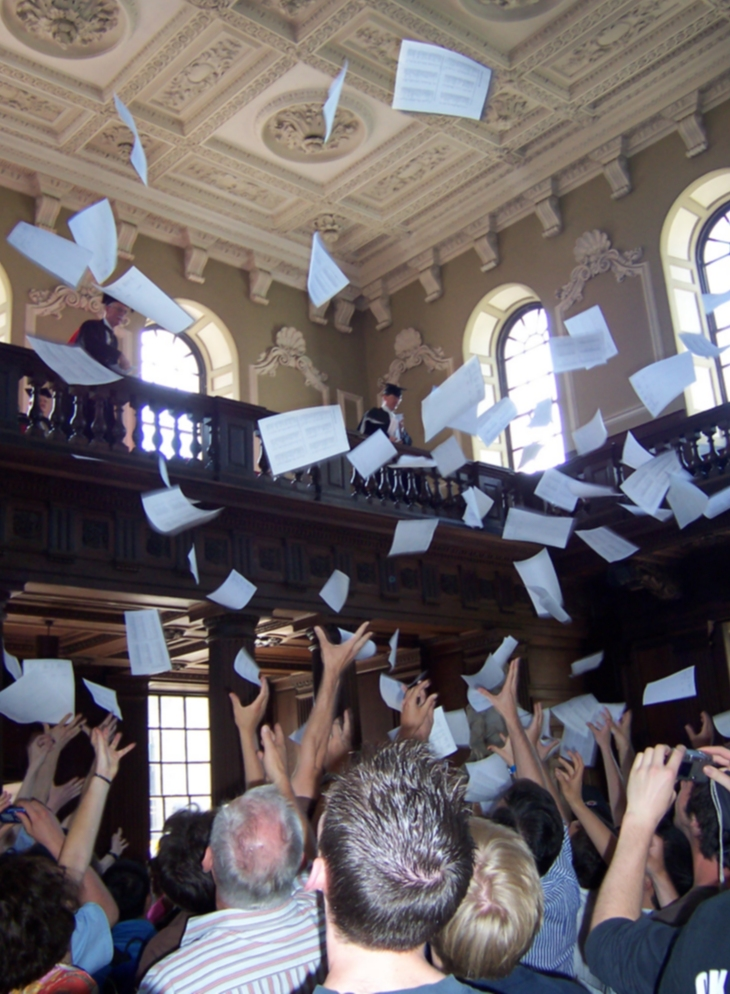
Mathematical tripos results are read out inside Senate House and then tossed from the balcony

A tripos is divided into two parts: Part I, which is broadly based, and Part II, which allows specialization within the student's chosen field. Since a bachelor's degree usually takes three years to complete, either Part I or Part II is two years, and the other one year. The details of this can vary from subject to subject. There is also an optional Part III offered in some subjects, such as the Mathematical Tripos; these are not required to complete a bachelor's degree. Some Part III courses allow the student to graduate with both a master's degree and a bachelor's degree: for example, scientific Part III courses allow the student to graduate with an MSci degree in addition to the BA degree that all Cambridge graduates receive. The Engineering Tripos is divided into four Parts (IA, IB, IIA, IIB), each corresponding to one academic year, and leads to the simultaneous awarding of the BA and MEng degrees.

Students are examined formally at the end of each part and are awarded a degree classification for each part. While each part receives its own classification, a student's performance in Part II is generally considered definitive for determining their overall ranking within their subject cohort (for example, the historic position of Senior Wrangler in the Mathematical Tripos was determined by Part II performance). Most subjects are examined in all three years; for example, the Natural Sciences Tripos has examinations for Part IA, Part IB, Part II, and in some subjects, Part III. The English, History and ASNaC Triposes have preliminary rather than full examinations at the end of the first year, though History and English have recently scrapped Preliminary exams in the first year and moved to an IA, IB, II structure with classed examinations in all years.

The student who achieves the highest marks in their Tripos subject is awarded the Winifred Georgina Holgate Pollard Memorial Prize. The prize is considered one of the most prestigious academic accolades awarded by the University of Cambridge. Each year, the University recognises these top students by publishing their names in the Reporter, the University of Cambridge's official journal, celebrating their academic excellence.

Degree regulations state that, to be awarded a degree, a student must have passed two honours examinations (i.e., two Tripos examinations) – this could include a Part I and a Part II, two Part I exams, or (in some cases) a Part I and a Part IA. From October 2011, students can be awarded an honours degree only if they have been awarded honours in a Part II or Part III examination; a combination of Part I examinations will allow a student to graduate with an Ordinary degree. All students must complete at least nine terms of residence (three years of study) – making it impossible for students to simply complete two one-year tripos parts. This makes it easy for an undergraduate to switch out of a subject. So a one-year Part I (or Part IA) must be followed by a two-year Part II, and usually vice versa. More exotic combinations are possible, with the permission of the student's college and prospective department, but some combinations create a four-year bachelor's degree. A few subjects – i.e., Management Studies, Manufacturing Engineering, and Linguistics (prior to October 2010) – exist only as Part II, and can be preceded by any manner of Part I subject.

Students who already possess a bachelor's degree or equivalent from another university are generally permitted to skip Part I, and thus can complete a Cambridge bachelor's degree in two years or less. Students already holding a BA degree from Cambridge are not permitted to collect a second BA from the university.

A student requesting to graduate (technically, 'be admitted to a degree') is assessed mainly on two criteria: not only the Triposes they have completed (requirements laid by the statutes and ordinances of Cambridge), as recorded in the Cambridge University Reporter (Cambridge's gazette newspaper), but also the number of terms kept (at least nine required for a BA degree; 10 for an undergraduate master's degree). A student's requests to graduate should also be approved by their college, and be unopposed by the regent house, one of the university's governing bodies with vetoing powers.

== List of Triposes ==
Below is the list of Triposes offered by the university (Latin numerals in brackets indicate the Parts available):

- Anglo-Saxon, Norse and Celtic Tripos (ASNaC) (I, II) (two-year part I)
- Archaeology Tripos (I, IIA, IIB)
- Architecture Tripos (IA, IB, II)
- Asian and Middle Eastern Studies (formerly Oriental Studies Tripos) (IA, IB, II)
- Chemical Engineering and Biotechnology Tripos ("Chem Eng") (IA, IB, II, III) (part III completion leads to MEng in addition to BA)
- Classical Tripos (IA, IB, II) (pre-IA year available to those without A-level Latin/Greek)
- Computer Science Tripos ("Comp Sci") (IA, IB, II, III) (part III completion leads to MEng plus BA)
- Economics Tripos (IA, IB, II)
- Education Tripos (I, II) (two-year part II)
- Engineering Tripos (IA, IB, IIA, IIB) (part IIB completion leads to MEng in addition to BA)
- English Tripos (IA, IB, II)
- Geographical Tripos (IA, IB, II)
- Historical Tripos (I, II) (two-year part I)
- Historical Tripos (from 2022) (IA, IB, II)
- History and Modern Languages Tripos (IA, IB, II) (two-year part II)
- History and Politics Tripos (IA, IB, II)
- History and Philosophy of Science Tripos (HPS) (IB, II)
- History of Art Tripos (I, IIA, IIB)
- Human, Social, and Political Sciences Tripos (HSPS) (I, IIA, IIB)
- Land Economy Tripos (IA, IB, II)
- Law Tripos (IA, IB, II)
- Linguistics Tripos (I, IIA, IIB)
- Management Studies Tripos ("Part II" only; the Management Studies Tripos is a one-year course)
- Manufacturing Engineering Tripos (I, II) (part III completion leads to MEng in addition to BA)
- Mathematical Tripos (IA, IB, II, III) (part III completion leads to MMath in addition to BA)
- Medical Sciences Tripos (MedST) (IA, IB)
- Modern and Medieval Languages Tripos (MML) (IA, IB, II)
- Music Tripos (IA, IB, II)
- Natural Sciences Tripos ("Nat Sci") (IA, IB, II, III) (part III completion leads to MSci in addition to BA)
- Philosophy Tripos (IA, IB, II)
- Psychological and Behavioural Sciences Tripos (I, IIA, IIB)
- Theological and Religious Studies Tripos (I, IIA, IIB)
- Veterinary Sciences Tripos (VetST) (IA, IB)

=== Triposes recently abolished, renamed or restructured ===
- Oriental Studies Tripos
- Education Studies Tripos
- Linguistics Tripos (Old Regulations)
- Archaeology and Anthropology Tripos
- Politics, Psychology and Sociology [PPS] Tripos
- Medical and Veterinary Sciences Tripos (MVST); split into separate Medical and Veterinary Sciences Triposes (MedST/VetST) from October 2018.
- Chemical Engineering Tripos (CET); succeeded by the Chemical Engineering and Biotechnology Tripos (CEBT) from October 2023.

== See also ==
- Honour Moderations (Oxford)
- Master of Arts (Oxbridge and Dublin)
- Wooden spoon (award)
- Wrangler (University of Cambridge)
