= John Purnell =

English academic administrator

John Purnell D.D. was an English academic administrator at the University of Oxford.

Between 1716 and 1726 Purnell was Consul acting for the Levant Company at Aleppo. Purnell was elected Warden (head) of New College, Oxford, in 1740, a post he held until 1764. During his time as Warden of New College, he was also Vice-Chancellor of Oxford University from 1747 until 1750.

Academic offices
Preceded by John Coxed	Warden of New College, Oxford; 1740–1764	Succeeded by Thomas Hayward
Preceded by Euseby Isham	Vice-Chancellor of Oxford University; 1747–1750	Succeeded by John Browne
