= Thomas Robinson (1749–1813) =

English cleric

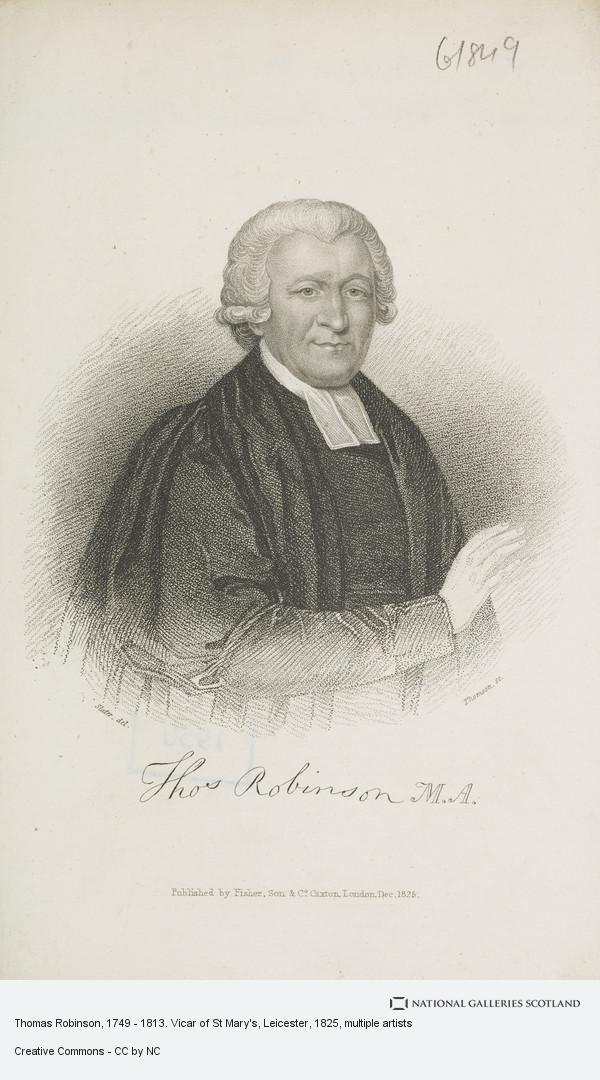
Thomas Robinson

Thomas Robinson (1749–1813) was an English cleric, known for his volumes of Scripture Characters.

== Life ==
He was born at Wakefield, Yorkshire, on 10 September 1749, the fourth son of James Robinson, a hosier there. He was sent at an early age to the Wakefield grammar school, and entered Trinity College, Cambridge as a sizar in 1768. In April 1771 he was elected a scholar of his college, in 1772 he graduated as seventh wrangler (M.A. 1775), and in October of the same year he was made a fellow of his college.

Around 1772 Robinson was ordained to the joint curacies of Witcham and Wichford in the Isle of Ely, then from 1773 to 1778 he was afternoon lecturer at All Saints', Leicester, and chaplain to the infirmary. In 1778 he was appointed to a lectureship newly founded in St. Mary's Church, Leicester. Later on in the same year he was made vicar of St. Mary's. He founded a number of charities there.

Robinson died at Leicester on 24 March 1813, and was buried on the 29th in the chancel of St. Mary's. His funeral sermon was preached by Edward Thomas Vaughan, who published a memoir of Robinson, with a selection of his letters, in 1815. The religious state of Leicester at the time, and Robinson's contribution, were described in a published eulogy by Robert Hall shortly after Robinson's death.

== Works ==
At St. Mary's in 1784 Robinson began the series of discourses on sacred biography by which he was best known. The earliest appeared in the Theological Miscellany of 1784, and the whole series was eventually printed under the title of Scripture Characters (1793, 4 vols.; 10th edit. 1815; abridgment, 1816). He wrote also The Christian System Unfolded, or Essays on the Doctrines and Duties of Christianity (1805, 3 vols.), and some shorter pieces. A collective edition of his Works was published in 8 vols. London, 1814.

== Family ==
Robinson was twice married. By his first wife, who died in 1791, he had a son Thomas (1790–1873) who became master of the Temple. His second wife, whom he married in 1797, was the widow of James Gerard, Warden of Wadham College, Oxford.
