= Samuel Hallifax =

English bishop

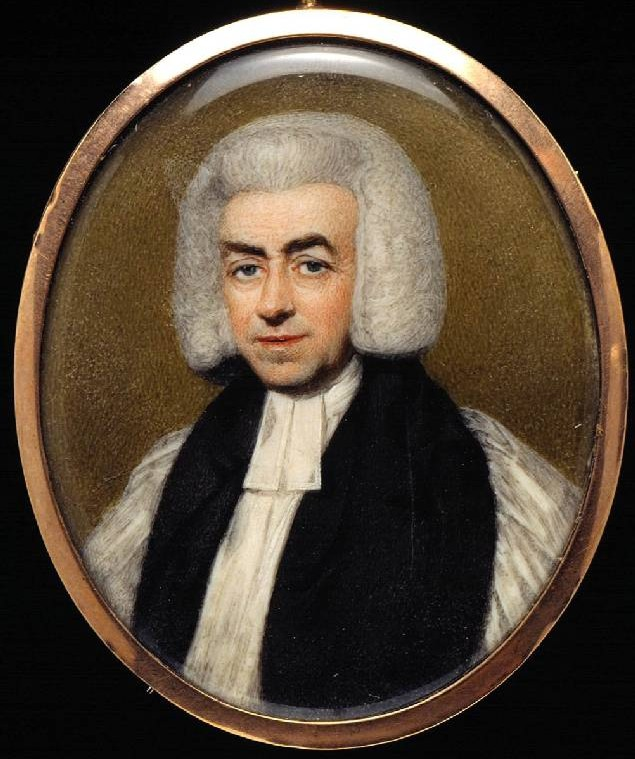
Samuel Hallifax, by Henry Edridge

Samuel Hallifax or Halifax (1733–1790) was an English churchman and academic, holder of several chairs at Cambridge and was successively Bishop of Gloucester (1781–1789) and Bishop of St Asaph (1789–1790).

== Life ==
He was born at Mansfield on 8 January 1733, eldest son of Robert Hallifax, apothecary, and by Hannah, daughter of Samuel Jebb of the same town. Robert Hallifax, M.D. (1735–1810), who was physician to the future George IV, was a younger brother. Sir Richard Jebb and John Jebb were his first cousins. After attending the grammar school of Mansfield, Hallifax was admitted to Jesus College, Cambridge, as an ordinary sizar 21 October 1749, and was elected to a closed scholarship. In January 1754 he graduated B.A., when he was third wrangler in mathematics, and won the chancellor's gold medal for classics, and in 1755 and 1756 he carried off one of the members' prizes. He was elected foundation scholar on 16 February 1754, and admitted to a fellowship on 22 June 1756. Next year he proceeded M.A., and before resigning his fellowship at Jesus College, early in 1760, held the college offices of praelector, dean, tutor, steward, and rental bursar.

On migrating to Trinity Hall Hallifax was elected to a fellowship (3 April 1760), became its tutor; he was noted for his harshness towards Samuel Heywood, a Unitarian. He took the degree of LL.D. in 1764. He was presented to the rectory of Cheddington, Buckinghamshire, 30 November 1765, and held it until 1777, but continued to reside at Cambridge, and retained his fellowship until 1 November 1775. When the chair of Arabic became vacant in January 1768, Hallifax, then deputy of William Ridlington, professor of civil law, defeated his cousin, John Jebb, who had studied Arabic for some time, in the contest for the Arabic chair. He held as sinecures for two years the positions of Sir Thomas Adams's Professor of Arabic and Lord Almoner's Professor of Arabic (1768–70); and fell out with John Jebb. Their differences were aggravated in 1772 on the attempt to abolish subscription to the Thirty-nine Articles by clergymen and members of the universities, when some letters signed 'Erasmus' in the newspapers, in favour of subscription, were generally ascribed to Hallifax. He was attacked by Ann Jebb with such wit and sarcasm that he is said to have called on Wilkie, her publisher, to request him not to print any more of her writings. They were again at odds in 1774, when Jebb carried his grace for a syndicate to promote annual examinations.

From 1770 to 1782 Hallifax held the regius professorship of civil law at Cambridge. He was created chaplain in ordinary to the king in February 1774, and D.D. by royal mandate in 1775. When Francis Topham vacated his position as master of faculties at Doctors' Commons, Hallifax succeeded to the post (1770). In 1778 Mrs. Gally, for his services to religion, rewarded him with the rectory of Warsop, Nottinghamshire, where he made the parish choir famous for miles round. His candidature in 1779 for the mastership of St Catharine's College, Cambridge, was unsuccessful.

On 27 October 1781 he was consecrated bishop of Gloucester, and on 4 April 1789 he was confirmed as bishop of St Asaph, apparently the first English bishop who had been translated to a Welsh see. He died of kidney stones at Dartmouth Street, Westminster, on 4 March 1790. His wife, whom he married in October 1775, was Catherine, second daughter of William Cooke, dean of Ely. Their surviving issue was one son and six daughters; the widow is said to have received a pension from George III. John Milner suggested in his End of Religious Controversy that Hallifax died a Catholic; he was contradicted in the British Critic April 1825, and Samuel Parr discussed the matter and Hallifax in detail.

== Works ==
His publications comprised:

- Saint Paul's Doctrine of Justification by Faith explained in three Discourses before the University of Cambridge, 1760; 2nd edit. 1762, in which he replied to some previous sermons by John Berridge on Justification by Faith alone, without Works.
- Two Sermons preached before the University, 1768, in praise of Benefactors.
- Three Sermons preached before the University on the Attempt to abolish Subscription to the Thirty-nine Articles of Religion, 1772, two editions; this produced an anonymous Letter to Dr. Hallifax upon the Subject of his three Discourses, 1772, by Samuel Blackall.
- An Analysis of the Roman Civil Law, in which a Comparison is occasionally made between the Roman Laws and those of England: being the heads of a course of Lectures publickly read in the University of Cambridge, 1774; 2nd edit. 1775; 4th edit. 1795; new edition, with alterations and additions by James William Geldart, 1836.
- Twelve Sermons on the Prophecies concerning the Christian Church, and in particular the Church of Papal Rome. Warburtonian Lectures at Lincoln's Inn, 1776.
- Sermons in Two Volumes by Samuel Ogden. To which is prefixed an Account of the Author's Life, with a vindication of his writings by Hallifax, 1780, 1786, 1788, and 1805. Hallifax followed Samuel Ogden at the Round Church, Cambridge.
- Preface by Hallifax to a Charge delivered by Bishop Butler at his Primary Visitation of Durham Diocese, 1786. The preface was added to editions of Joseph Butler's Analogy from 1788.

He contributed to the university collections of poems printed in 1760 and 1763. He published fourteen single sermons, and that preached in 1788 on the anniversary of the martyrdom of King Charles provoked 'A Letter to the Bishops on the Test Acts, including Strictures on Hallifax's Sermon 1789.' An apology for the clergy and liturgy of the established church was attributed to him by Michael Lort.

Church of England titles
Preceded by James Yorke	Bishop of Gloucester; 1781–1789	Succeeded by Richard Beadon
Preceded by Jonathan Shipley	Bishop of St Asaph; 1789–1790	Succeeded by Lewis Bagot
