= Anthony Ashley Bevan =

British orientalist (1859–1933)

Bevan in 1920.

Anthony Ashley Bevan, FBA (1859–1933) was a British orientalist.

He was the son of the banker Robert Cooper Lee Bevan, and his second wife, the translator and poet Frances Bevan. Frances was the author of the famous book Three Friends of God, and Songs of Eternal Life.

He was educated at Cheam, Surrey, the Gymnase Littéraire in Lausanne, and at the University of Strasbourg (Strassburg), where he studied under Theodor Noeldeke, a scholar in the field of oriental studies. His relationship with Nöldeke lasted to the end of his life as he kept up a pretty regular correspondence with him covering about half a century. He said in his introduction to the third volume of Al-Mufaddaliyat, in 1924: "I desire to express my deep gratitude to Professor Theodor Nöldeke, who from the first had contributed much towards the elucidation of the Arabic text and most kindly answered a large number of questions which I addressed to him with regard to various difficulties". Educated in Lausanne and Strassburg, Bevan had already laid the foundations of his immense Semitic learning when in 1884 he came from Nöldeke to William Wright. Their influence appears in all his work. He had a regular correspondence with Ignaz Goldziher as well for about 30 years i.e. to the end of Goldziher's life.

Letter by Bevan (1911)

Anthony entered Trinity College, Cambridge in 1884, and obtained a first in the Semitic languages tripos of 1887. In 1888 he gained a Tyrwhitt Hebrew scholarship and the Mason prize for biblical Hebrew, and two years later was elected a Fellow and appointed lecturer in oriental languages. In 1893 he became Lord Almoner's Professor of Arabic at Cambridge, a post previously held by his brother-in-law Ion Keith-Falconer. It had an annual stipend of only £50, but Bevan had ample private means (his father was the head of the banking house which would become Barclays) and was soon dispensed from the one obligation of lecturing formally once a year. The post was abolished after his death. He was elected a Fellow of the British Academy in 1916, resigning in 1928.

Bevan was "one of the dozen most learned Arabists, not of England and Europe only, but of the whole world. He was almost equally distinguished for his knowledge of Hebrew and Old Testament literature. He knew Syriac thoroughly and other Semitic languages well, and he had an excellent acquaintance with Persian language and literature". (Burkitt).

He also had a knowledge of Sanskrit, and was fluent in French, Italian, and German. His published work was relatively small, but of the highest scholarship. He was fastidious and scrupulously careful: as he observed in the course of one of his typically uncompromising reviews, ‘even slight inaccuracies are liable to become sources of confusion’. His friends and pupils could well believe the story that he was almost reduced to tears on discovering a misprint in one of his own works.

If Bevan's output was slight he spared himself no pains in assisting his colleagues, among other ways by reading their proofs: many, including his brother Edwyn, an archaeologist and Hellenist, were indebted to his scholarship. He was generous with his inherited wealth. He was a benefactor of the University Library and Museum of Archaeology, gave all his books to the Faculty of Oriental Languages, and left £10,000 to Trinity. Unostentatious, he was determined to ensure that his benefactions were made without drawing attention to himself.

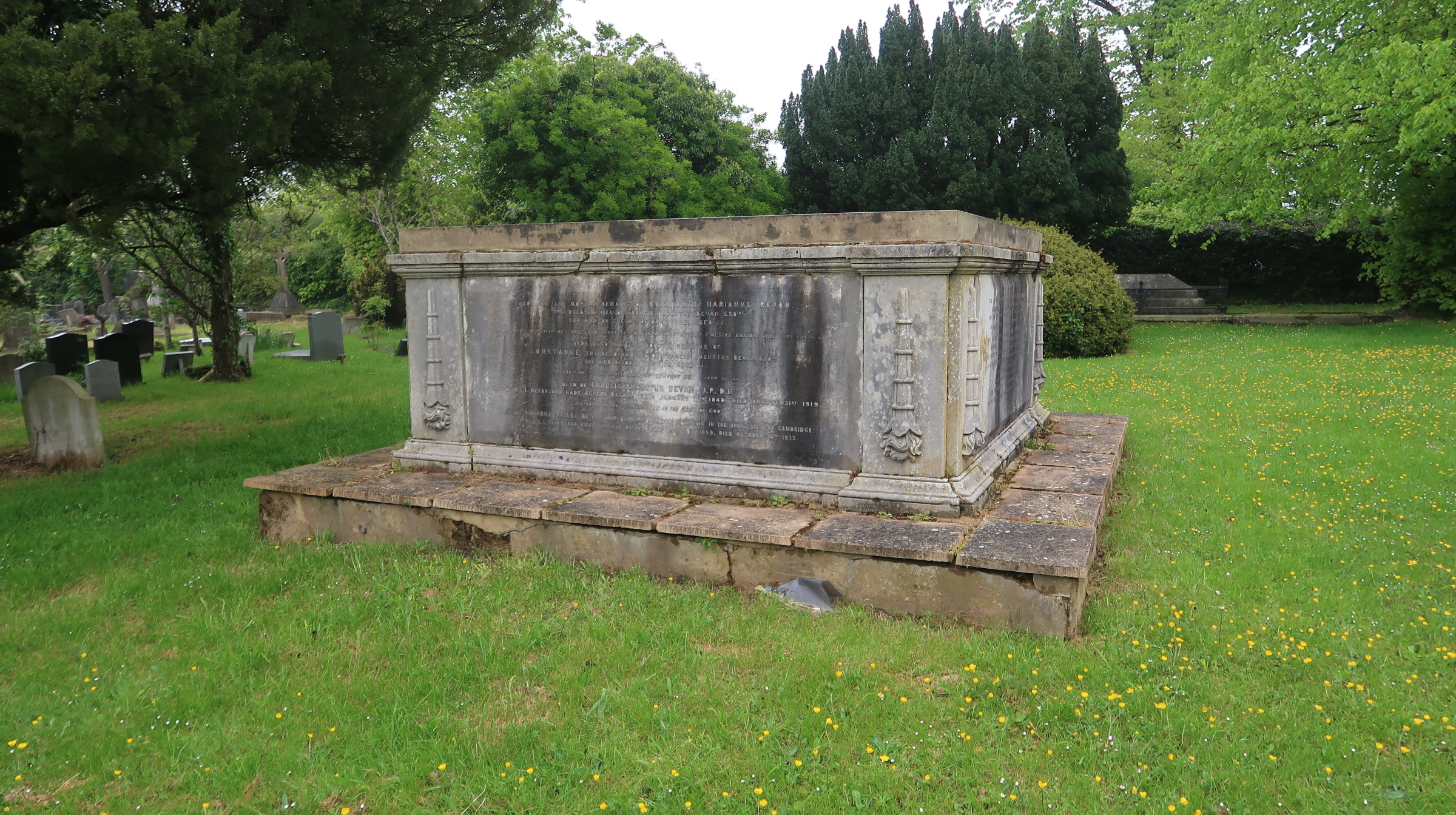
Anthony Ashley Bevan (Lord Almoner's Reader in Arabic in the University of Cambridge) buried in the family vault in Christ Church, Cockfosters, London UK (note the inverted flaming torches symbolising life snuffed out)

Bevan never visited any Arab countries, and his pronunciation of Arabic was thought "weird" by a former student. He was well liked by students and faculty, described as generous, and called a "liberal benefactor" to the college.
