= John Cobb (academic) =

John Cobb, DCL (19 August 1678, in Adderbury – 10 December 1725, in Oxford) was a college leader in the first quarter of the 18th Century.

Dobson was educated at New College where he graduated BCL in 1705. He was Warden of New College, Oxford, from 1712 until 1720; and Warden of Winchester College from 1720 until his death. He held incumbencies at Newbottle, Albourne, Somerton and Stoke Lyne.

Academic offices
Preceded by Thomas Brathwait	Warden of New College, Oxford; 1712–1720	Succeeded by John Dobson
