= Sir Thomas Adams's Professor of Arabic =

Title used at Cambridge University

Sir Thomas Adams's Professor of Arabic is a title used at Cambridge University for the holder of a professorship of Arabic; Sir Thomas Adams, 1st Baronet (1586–1668), Lord Mayor of London in 1645, gave to Cambridge University the money needed to create the first Professorship of Arabic.

The professorship was partly created to propagate the Christian faith "to them who now sit in darkness".

== Sir Thomas Adams's Professors ==
- Abraham Wheelocke (1632)
- Edmund Castell (1666)
- John Luke (1685)
- Charles Wright (1702–1710)
- Simon Ockley (1711)
- Leonard Chappelow (1720)
- Samuel Hallifax (1768)
- William Craven (1770)
- Joseph Dacre Carlyle (1795)
- John Palmer (1804)
- Samuel Lee (1819)
- Thomas Jarrett (1831)
- Henry Griffin Williams (1854)
- William Wright (1870)
- William Robertson Smith (1889)
- Charles Pierre Henri Rieu (1894)
- Edward Granville Browne (1902)
- Reynold Alleyne Nicholson (1926)
- Charles Ambrose Storey (1933)
- Arthur John Arberry (1947–1969)
- Robert Bertram Serjeant (1970–1982)
- Malcolm Cameron Lyons (1985)
- Tarif Khalidi (1996–2002)
- James Montgomery (2012– )

== See also ==
- Lord Almoner's Professor of Arabic
