= John Coxed =

John Coxed (died 1757) was an English academic, Warden of New College, Oxford, from 1730 until 1740.

== Life ==
Coxed was born in Bucknell, Oxfordshire, son of the Rev. John Coxed. He was educated at New College where he graduated BCL in 1725 and DCL in 1730. He is credited in 1739 with the LL.D. (Legum Doctor) rather than the D.C.L. (Doctor of Civil Law) degree.

Leaving New College, Coxed was Warden of Winchester College from 1740, replacing Henry Bigg who was his predecessor also at New College.

== Death and family ==
Coxed died in 1757 and his widow Cecilia placed a monumental inscription at Winchester. She was the daughter of Isaac Selfe and his wife Penelope Lucas, daughter of Charles Lucas, 2nd Baron Lucas, and had previously been married to James Wallis (died 1735); and died in 1760. Paul Methuen MP was the son of her sister Anne.

Academic offices
Preceded by Henry Bigg	Warden of New College, Oxford; 1730–1740	Succeeded by John Purnell
