= Leonard Chappelow =

British orientalist (1693–1768)

Leonard Chappelow (1683–1768) was an English clergyman and orientalist. He was Sir Thomas Adams's Professor of Arabic at the University of Cambridge, from 1720, for life, and also Lord Almoner's Professorship of Arabic.

== Life ==
He was born at Beverley, Yorkshire, the son of Edward Chappelow, a merchant. He matriculated as a sizar at St John's College, Cambridge in 1709. He graduated B.A. in 1713, and M.A. in 1716, and was a Fellow from 1717 to 1731.

Ordained in 1716, he was rector of Childerley, Cambridgeshire from 1723, and of Little Hormead, Hertfordshire from 1730. He was vicar of Royston, 1730 to 1738, and vicar of Great Hormead, from 1762 to 1768.

He died 13 January 1768.

== Works ==
He published an Arabic grammar in 1730; also translations, and a Commentary on the Book of Job in 1752.
