= Thomas Brathwait =

English academic administrator

Thomas Brathwait D.D. was an English academic administrator at the University of Oxford.

Brathwait was elected Warden (head) of New College, Oxford, in 1702, a post he held until 1712. During his time as Warden of New College, he was also Vice-Chancellor of Oxford University from 1710 until 1712. Thereafter he was warden of Winchester College.

Academic offices
Preceded by Richard Traffles	Warden of New College, Oxford; 1703–1712	Succeeded by John Cobb
Preceded by William Lancaster	Vice-Chancellor of Oxford University; 1710–1712	Succeeded by Bernard Gardiner
