= James Geldart =

English cleric and academic (1785–1876)

James William Geldart LL.D. (1785–1876) was an English cleric and academic. He was Regius Professor of Civil Law at Cambridge, from 1814 to 1847.

== Life ==
The eldest son of the Rev. James Geldart, rector of Kirk Deighton, Yorkshire (died 12 November 1839), and his wife Sarah, daughter of William Williamson of Linton Spring, Wetherby, he was born at Swinnow Hall, Wetherby, on 15 February 1785. He was educated at Beverley grammar school, and was admitted at Trinity Hall, Cambridge on 5 May 1800, becoming a scholar in December 1803. On 16 February 1808 he was elected Skirne Fellow of St. Catharine's Hall, but returned to Trinity Hall as a Fellow and tutor on 4 October 1809. He resided there as vice-master until 1820.

Geldart took the degree of LL.B. in 1806 and became LL.D. in 1814. On 28 January 1814 he was admitted Regius Professor of Civil Law at Cambridge, on the nomination of Lord Liverpool. A reforming professor, he lectured often, and introduced a written examination at Cambridge for the LL.B. degree in the absence of official sanction from the Senate. He continued in the post until 1847.

After the death of his father, and on his own presentation, Geldart became rector of Kirk Deighton in January 1840, and held the benefice for the rest of his life. He died in the rectory house there on 16 February 1876, and was buried in Kirk Deighton churchyard on 19 February.

== Works ==
Geldart produced an edition in 1836 of An Analysis of the Civil Law by Samuel Hallifax, the set text of his lectures.

== Family ==
Geldart married, on 4 August 1836, Mary Rachel, daughter of William Desborough of Hemingford Grey, Huntingdonshire, who survived him. He left two sons, James William Geldart who became rector of Kirk Deighton, and Henry Charles Geldart, who was Sheriff of Cambridgeshire and Huntingdonshire in 1887–8.
