= John Oglander (warden) =

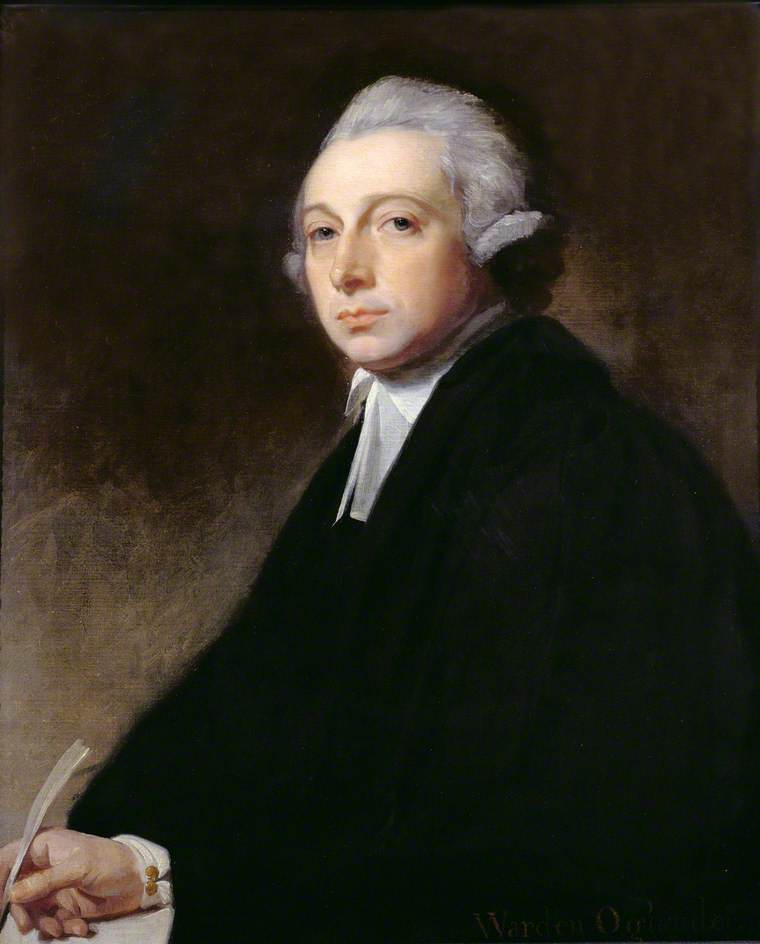

John Oglander , DD (29 October 1737 – 13 January 1794) was Warden of New College, Oxford, from 1792 until his death.

Oglander was born in Nunwell. He matriculated at St John's College, Oxford in 1756. He then migrated to New College where he graduated BA in 1761, MA in 1765 and BD in 1770.

Academic offices
Preceded by Thomas Hayward	Warden of New College, Oxford; 1768–1794	Succeeded by Samuel Gauntlett
