= Nesta Helen Webster =

British far-right author (1876–1960)

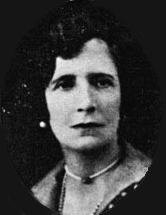
- Webster aged 53.
- Born: Nesta Helen Bevan; 24 August 1876; Trent Park, London, England
- Died: 16 May 1960 (aged 83)
- Education: Westfield College
- Occupation: Author
- Spouse: Arthur Templer Webster
- Relatives: Robert Cooper Lee Bevan (father); Emma Frances Shuttleworth (mother)
- Writing career
- Subjects: International Revolutionary conspiracy, feminism
- Notable works: World Revolution: The Plot Against Civilization; Secret Societies and Subversive Movements

Nesta Helen Webster (née Bevan, 24 August 1876 – 16 May 1960) was an English author who revived conspiracy theories about the Illuminati. She claimed that the secret society's members were occultists, plotting communist world domination, through a Jewish cabal, the Masons and Jesuits. She blamed the group for events including the French Revolution, 1848 Revolution, the First World War, and the Bolshevik Revolution. Her writing influenced later conspiracy theories and ideologies, including American anti-communism (particularly the John Birch Society) and the militia movement.

In 1920, Webster became a contributor to The Jewish Peril, a series of articles in the London Morning Post centred on the forged document The Protocols of the Elders of Zion. These articles were compiled and published in the same year in book form under the title of The Cause of World Unrest. Webster claimed that the authenticity of the Protocols of the Elders of Zion was an "open question". Before World War II, Webster was involved in British fascist groups.

== Early years ==
Born in 1876, in the North London stately home Trent Park, Webster was the youngest daughter of Robert Cooper Lee Bevan and Emma Frances Shuttleworth. Her parents, members of the Plymouth Brethren, raised her in a strict home. She was educated at Westfield College, now part of Queen Mary, University of London. When she became an adult, she travelled around the world, visiting India, Burma, Singapore, and Japan. In 1904, she married Arthur Templer Webster, Superintendent of the British Police in India.

== Writing ==
Reading the letters of the Countess of Sabran, Webster believed herself to be a reincarnation of someone from the time of the French Revolution. Her first book on the subject of the French Revolution was The Chevalier de Boufflers, followed by The French Revolution: A study in democracy, in which she credited a conspiracy based around Freemasonry as responsible for the French Revolution. She wrote that "the lodges of the German Freemasons and Illuminati were thus the source whence emanated all those anarchic schemes which culminated in the Terror, and it was at a great meeting of the Freemasons in Frankfurt-am-Main, three years before the French Revolution began, that the deaths of Louis XVI and Gustavus III of Sweden were first planned."

Webster differentiated between "Continental Freemasonry" and "British Freemasonry"; while the former was a subversive force in her mind, she considered the latter "an honourable association" and a "supporter of law, order and religion". Masons of the United Grand Lodge of England supported her writings.

== Political views ==
The publication of the antisemitic forgery The Protocols of the Elders of Zion led Webster to believe that Jews were the driving force behind an international conspiracy, which in World Revolution: the Plot Against Civilization she developed into a "Judeo-Masonic" conspiracy behind international finance and responsible for the Bolshevik revolution. Following this, she became the leading writer of The Patriot, an antisemitic paper financed by Alan Percy.

Winston Churchill praised her in a 1920 article entitled "Zionism versus Bolshevism: A Struggle for the Soul of the Jewish People," in which he wrote "This movement among the Jews is not new. From the days of Spartacus-Weishaupt to those of Karl Marx, and down to Trotsky (Russia), Bela Kun (Hungary), Rosa Luxembourg (Germany), and Emma Goldman (United States), this world-wide conspiracy for the overthrow of civilisation and for the reconstitution of society on the basis of arrested development, of envious malevolence, and impossible equality, has been steadily growing. It played, as a modern writer, Mrs. Webster, has so ably shown, a definitely recognisable part in the tragedy of the French Revolution."

Webster became involved in several far-right groups including the British Fascists, the Anti-Socialist Union, The Link, and the British Union of Fascists. In her books, Webster argued that Bolshevism was part of a much older and more secret, self-perpetuating conspiracy. She described three possible sources for this conspiracy: Zionism, Pan-Germanism or "the occult power". She claimed that even if the Protocols of the Elders of Zion were fake, they still described how Jews behave. Webster dismissed much of the persecution of the Jews by Nazi Germany as exaggeration and propaganda, having abandoned her anti-German views due to her initial admiration of Adolf Hitler. She came to oppose Hitler after the Molotov–Ribbentrop Pact.

Webster favoured "traditional roles for women and believed women should primarily influence men to be better men", but was frustrated by limits on the careers open to women because she believed jobs should not just be for the money but should be purposeful professions. She saw marriage as limiting her choices, although her wedding financially allowed her to be a writer. She believed in raising women's education, and that the education they had been receiving was inferior to men's, making women less capable than they could be. She believed that, with better education, women would have substantial political capabilities to a degree considered "non-traditional", but without that education they'd be only as men imagined all women to be, the suppliers of men's and children's "material needs". "[S]he implied ... [that] women and men might well be true equals." She believed there had been "women's supremacy ... [in] pre-revolutionary France, when powerful women never attempted to compete directly with men, but instead drew strength from other areas where they excelled. She favoured women being allowed to vote and favoured keeping the British Parliamentary system for the benefit of both women and men, although doubted that voting would provide everything women needed, and thus did not join the suffrage movement. After the partial women's franchise was granted in 1918, she attacked proposals to lower the voting age for women from 30 to 21. In the 1920s, "her views on women had become more conservative", and she made them secondary to her conspiracy writing.

Much of her conspiracy theories and theorizing was anti-German in nature, often in combination with anti-Communism, claiming that Germans were allied with the Soviet Union. Within her obsession with secret societies, the German Vereinigung Vergewaltigter Völker (League of Oppressed People) and Druidenorden (International Grand Lodge of Druidism) were among her obsessions. According to Webster, both organisations had a pro-Soviet bent. With regards to the VVV, she alleged that it derived from the League for Small and Subject Nationalities and was secretly funded by a mysterious American financier, John de Kay. The founder of the League for Small and Small Subject Nationalities, Dudley Field Malone, was rumoured to have been an attorney for the first Soviet Embassy in America. Similarly, the Druidenorden, according to Webster, was secretly led by Count Ulrich von Brockdorff-Rantzau, who had served both as Foreign Minister of the Weimar Republic and as the ambassador to the Soviet Union. The activities she blamed the Druidenorden for included the nascent Zionist movement in Mandatory Palestine, as well as the activities of the Irish Republican Army. She went so far that when the Treaty of Rapallo was signed, she placed her anti-German views above her antisemitic views, explicitly rejecting any claim that of a Jewish conspiracy behind it and argued that the Jews "from the time of Frederick the Great had frequently acted as Prussia's most faithful and efficient agents."

Historian Markku Ruotsila argues that Webster's conspiratorial framework was rooted in her upbringing in the dispensational premillennialist theological context popularized in the previous decades by influential Plymouth Brethren figure John Nelson Darby. The Illuminati, he argues, was a secular form of the Antichrist in Webster's thinking.

Webster came to depict world events as manifestations of a basic transcendental struggle between Christ and Satan. She forged out of the archetypal materials of her Christian heritage a highly appealing, prescriptive matrix of interpretations that placed contemporary radical movements in the context of premillennialist eschatology, dispensed with the original meanings of that eschatology, and put in their place her own version of the Satanic cast of the end-times. Doctrinally, the Illuminati theory that she constructed and successfully disseminated was in many ways a perversion of premillennialist Christian eschatology. Yet, on another level, it was deeply indebted both to the latter's categories and to its historical sequencing.

== Criticism ==
In February 1924, Hilaire Belloc wrote to an American Jewish friend regarding one of Webster's publications which purported to expose evidence of Jewish conspiracy. Though Belloc's record of writing about Jews has itself attracted accusations of antisemitism, his contempt for Webster's own efforts was evident:

In my opinion it is a lunatic book. She is one of those people who have got one cause on the brain. It is the good old 'Jewish revolutionary' bogey. But there is a type of unstable mind which cannot rest without morbid imaginings, and the conception of a single cause simplifies thought. With this good woman it is the Jews, with some people it is the Jesuits, with others Freemasons and so on. The world is more complex than that.

Umberto Eco, whose novel The Prague Cemetery recounts the development of the Protocols, characterised Webster's propagation of the document as evidence of a delusional tendency:

In 1921... the Times of London discovered the old pamphlet by Joly and realized that it was the source for the Protocols. But evidence is not enough for those who want to live in a horror novel... [Webster's] syllogism is impeccable: since the Protocols resemble the story I have told, they confirm it. Or: the Protocols confirm the story I have concocted from them; therefore they are true.

== Influence ==
Webster's views have become influential among the American far-right; her works were "almost certainly…first popularized in America" by John Birch Society founder Robert Welch in the 1960s. Her Illuminati conspiracy theories would later make their "most influential appearance" in Christian fundamentalist televangelist Pat Robertson's 1991 book The New World Order. They have also become established among the American militia and Patriot movements, as well as Islamic extremist movements.

== Works ==
- The Chevalier De Boufflers. A Romance of the French Revolution, E.P. Dutton and Company, 1927. [1st Pub. London, John Murray, 1910. Reprints: 1916; 1920; 1924; 1925; E.P. Dutton & Co., New York, 1926].
- Britain's Call to Arms: An Appeal to Our Women. London, Hugh Rees, 1914.
- The Sheep Track. An Aspect of London Society. London: John Murray (1914).
- The French Revolution: A Study in Democracy. London: Constable & Co. (1919).
- The French Terror and Russian Bolshevism. London: Boswell Printing & Publishing Co. (1920) [?]. OCLC 22692582.
- World Revolution. The Plot Against Civilization, Small, Maynard & Company, 1921 [1st Pub. London, Constable & Co., 1921. Reprints: Constable, 1922; Chawleigh, The Britons Publishing Co., 1971; Sudbury, Bloomfield Books, 1990?].
  - The Revolution of 1848, Kessinger Publishing, 2010.
- The Past History of the World Revolution. A Lecture, Woolwich, Royal Artillery Institution, 1921.
- with Kurt Kerlen, Boche and Bolshevik, being a series of articles from the Morning Post of London, reprinted for distribution in the United States, New York, Beckwith, 1923. Reprint: Sudbury, Bloomfield Books [1990?]. ISBN 1-4179-7949-6.
- Secret Societies and Subversive Movements, London, Boswell Printing & Publishing Co. London, 1924. Reprints: Boswell, 1928 and 1936; London, The Britons Publishing Co., London, 1955 and 1964; Palmdale, Christian Book Club of America and Sudbury and Sudbury, Bloomfield Books, 198 [?]; Kessinger Publishing, 2003. ISBN 0-7661-3066-5.
- The Socialist Network. London: Boswell Printing & Publishing Co. (1926).
  - Reprinted: Boswell (1933); Sudbury, Bloomfield (1989?); Noontide Press (2000). ISBN 0913022063.
- The Need for Fascism in Britain. London: British Fascists, Pamphlet no. 17 (1926).
- The Surrender of an Empire. London: Boswell Printing & Publishing Co. (1931).
  - Reprinted: Angriff Press (1972); Gordon Press Publishers (1973); Sudbury, Bloomfield Books (1990?).
- The Origin and Progress of the World Revolution. London: Boswell Printing & Publishing Co. (1932).
- (with the pseudonym of Julian Sterne). The Secret of the Zodiac, London: Boswell Printing & Publishing Co. (1933).
- Germany and England. London: Boswell Publishing Co. (1938). Revised and reprinted from The Patriot.
- Louis XVI and Marie Antoinette Before the Revolution. London: Constable & Co. (1936).
- Spacious Days: An Autobiography. London: Hutchinson (1949).
  - Crowded Hours: Part Two of her Autobiography. The manuscript "disappeared from her publisher's office." It remains unpublished.
- Marie-Antoinette Intime (in French). Paris: La Table ronde (1981). ISBN 2710300613.

=== Selected articles ===
- “Conservatism – A Living Creed,” The Patriot, Vol. I, No. 1, 9 February 1922.
- "Danton," The Patriot, Vol. II, No. 16, 22 May 1922.
- "Saint Just," The Patriot, Vol. II, No. 18, 8 June 1922.
- "A Few Terrorists," The Patriot, Vol. II, No. 19, 15 June 1922.
- "The Marquis De Sade," The Patriot, Vol. II, No. 20, 22 June 1922.
- “'Beppo' and Bakunin," The Patriot, Vol. II, No. 22, 6 July 1922.

== Bibliography ==
- Gilman, Richard M., Behind "World Revolution": The Strange Career of Nesta H. Webster, Ann Arbor, Insights Books, 1982.
- Lee, Martha F., Nesta Webster: The Voice of Conspiracy, in Journal of Women's History, Vol. 17, No. 3, p. 81 ff. Fall, 2005. Biography.

== See also ==
- Blair Coan
- Elizabeth Dilling
- Ralph Easley
- Hamilton Fish
- David George Plotkin
