= Ion Keith-Falconer =

Scottish missionary and Arabic scholar

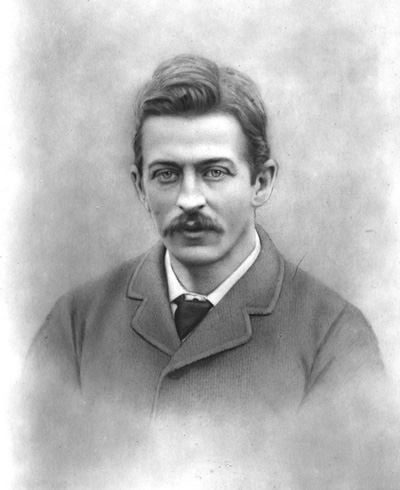
- Ion Grant Neville Keith-Falconer photo
- Born: 5 July 1856; Edinburgh, Scotland
- Died: 11 May 1887 (aged 30); Aden, Yemen
- Education: Trinity College, Cambridge
- Occupations: Missionary, educator
- Spouse: Gwendolen Bevan (m. 1884)
- Father: Francis Keith-Falconer
- Relatives: Algernon Keith-Falconer (brother); Anthony Keith-Falconer (grandfather)

Ion Grant Neville Keith-Falconer (5 July 1856 – 11 May 1887) was a Scottish missionary and Arabic scholar, the third son of the 8th Earl of Kintore.

Keith-Falconer was born in Edinburgh. After attending Harrow School and studying at the University of Cambridge, he moved into evangelistic work in London. In 1886, he was appointed Arabic professor at Cambridge, but his career was cut short near Aden while in missionary work. He translated the Fables of Bidpaï. He was an athlete, a champion cyclist and is described as a world cycling champion in 1878.

== Background ==
Keith-Falconer was the third son of the Earl of Kintore and shared his childhood between the ancestral home in Scotland and Brighton on the southern English coast. In 1869, when he was 13, he succeeded in obtaining a place, through examination, at Harrow School, then in countryside north-west of London. He took notes of his lessons in shorthand, which he had taught himself.

Keith-Falconer left Harrow in 1873, having acquired a tutor to teach him mathematics, studying with the Rev Lewis Hensley at his vicarage in Hitchin. As well as trigonometry and algebra and other subjects which seem not to have interested him particularly, he continued cycling and learned to sing. "This," said Hensley, was "for the promotion of the Temperance cause, to which he devoted himself by assisting in the entertainments and addresses of a Temperance Brigade of young men." Keith-Falconer went up to Trinity College, Cambridge, in September 1874. He lived at 21 Market Hill until he married. He finished his graduate studies with a First and began to read for honours in theological tripos.

== Cycling ==
A teacher at Harrow School, E. E. Bowen, said:

His bicycling feats were one common subject of interest between us. Bicycles were just coming into fashion when he went to the University; he was an enthusiast in the use of them and an admirable performer; and when he appeared in riding costume at Harrow, with his tall figure mounted on the enormous machine that he rode, it was a sight to see. He kept up the amusement for many years: for two or more he was certainly the best bicyclist in England, and his delight in success only shewed in more than common relief the charming modesty with which he carried his honours.

The cycling historian Jim McGurn said:

Keith-Falconer came from an aristocratic family in the Scottish Highlands. Having ridden a low velocipede at Harrow School he took to the high bicycle as a student at Cambridge. He was 6ft 3in tall (1m 87), an exceptional height for the period, even for an aristocrat of well-nourished stock. He could master a very high machine, which gave him a competitive advantage. Keith-Falconer also had the money to buy the best bicycles and the leisure to tour extensively. Although he may have been the fastest cyclist in the world, his cycling interests were of secondary importance to him. So amateurish was his attitude that on at least two occasions he forgot about racing engagements and turned up at short notice to win in heroic style.

It was while at Cambridge – where he was elected vice-president of the university bicycle club on 6 June 1874 – that he won his first bicycle races. In a letter to his sister-in-law on 11 November 1874, he wrote:

Yesterday was the ten-mile bicycle race. Three started. I was one. I ran the distance in 34 minutes, being the fastest time, amateur or professional, on record. I was not at all exhausted... Today I am going to amuse the public by riding an 86-inch bicycle to Trumpington and back. There is a little scale of steps up it, up which I am helped, and then started off and left to myself. It is great fun riding this leviathan: it creates such an extraordinary sensation among the old dons who happen to be passing.

In 1875, he won a club race over the 42 miles (68 km) from Hatfield to Cambridge, and on 10 May won a race against Oxford University from St Albans to Oxford, 50 miles (80 km). The following April he won a four-mile (6 km) race, described as "the amateur championship", at Lillie Bridge, setting a record time. On 15 May he won the Cambridge club's 50-mile (80 km) race at Fenner's in 3h 20m 37s.

On 11 May 1878 he won the National Cyclists' Union two-mile (3 km) championship at Stamford Bridge. It was probably this race that gave him the status of world champion. Until the creation of the International Cycling Association, the NCU's championships were considered the unofficial championships of the world.

On 28 May 1881, Keith-Falconer went cycle-touring through Oxford, Pangbourne and Harrow, a warm-up to his Land's End – John o'Groats ride, that started on 4 June. Riding from one end of Britain to the other was, in the 19th century, a journey of poor or unmade roads, riding a high-wheeled bicycle with precarious balance and poor brakes. It demanded good weather. When it did not come, Keith-Falconer left Penzance after four days and returned to London and Cambridge.

In 1882, Keith-Falconer rode from Land's End to John o' Groats, the length of Britain, in 13 days. He rode 215 miles (346 km) in his last two days. His last race of importance was the amateur championship on 29 July 1882, at Crystal Palace, outside London. He won, seven minutes better than the record, in 2h 43m 58s.

Keith-Falconer's views on cycling were not always those shared by cyclists of lesser opportunity. On 20 August 1881 he wrote to his friend Mr Charrington, with whom he worked in the East End of London (see below):

It is an excellent thing to encourage an innocent sport (such as bicycling) which keeps young fellows out of the public-houses, music halls and gambling hells and all the other traps that are ready to catch them. It is a great advantage to enter for a few races in public, and not merely to ride on the road for exercise, because in the former case one has to train oneself and this involves abstinence from beer and wine and tobacco, and early going to bed and early rising, and gets one's body into a really vigorous, healthy state. As to betting, nearly all Clubs forbid it, strictly... A bicycle race-course is as quiet as a public science lecture.

== Early evangelism ==
The area outside Cambridge known as Barnwell was then a rough area inhabited largely by labourers working on the railways, of which four competing lines met in Cambridge. Others worked in the fossil beds. Robert Sinker, Keith-Falconer's biographer, said the labourers were "mostly poor and ignorant, including even yet a large number of persons following vicious courses; and while the Gospel teaching of a band of devoted men was gradually leavening the mass, yet while the workers were slowly gaining on the task which faced them, hundreds were dying."

Keith-Falconer threw himself with others in May 1875 into a missionary project for the area. They hired a theatre and held preaching meetings there for a month. "All this time," Sinker said, "Keith-Falconer was a steady and consistent helper of the mission, by his purse, by his personal cooperation, and we may feel sure by his prayers." At the end of the month, they judged their work a success and repeated the process for three and a half years at the Ragged School, in New Street. There, Sinker said:

The gathering of people, of whom there were several hundreds, displayed a remarkable contrast to an ordinary Christian congregation. They represented a whole stratum decidedly below that of the decent working man of the poorer sort. Many were ragged, most were dirty and unkempt, and before the service began, many behaved outrageously. Yet when the service began, I rejoice to say, the conduct was orderly enough; evidently many, while coming in the first instance merely from curiosity, bore in their way a friendly feeling enough for their neighbours. Yet it may be noted, as shewing the stratum from which the bulk was drawn, that on one of the speakers' remarking: 'A great many of you, I know, have been, and some I fear still are, thieves!' he was greeted, in tones which shewed that no offence had been taken, with ready cries of 'Yes, sir!'

Keith-Falconer lectured this audience on Zelophehad's daughters.

The theatre in Barnwell became available in autumn 1878 and the evangelists acquired it, although outbid at the auction. Keith-Falconer was also involved in acquisition of the Great Assembly Hall in Mile End Road, in the East End of London. Here, the Tower Hamlets Mission was established. The state of the area is summarised by this account:

At the close of one of the meetings, a little boy was found sobbing. With some difficulty he was induced to tell his tale. It was simple. His widowed mother, his sisters, and he, all lived in one room. Everything had been sold to buy bread, except two white mice, the boy's pets. Through all their poverty, they had kept these white mice; but at last they too must go! With the proceeds he bought street songs, which he retailed on the 'waste' and so obtained the means of getting more bread for his mother and his sisters. Now they were completely destitute. The boy was accompanied home. Home! It was a wretched attic, in one of the most dilapidated houses. It was a wretchedly cold and dismal day. In the broken-down grate the dead embers of yesterday's firing remained. On the table, in a piece of newspaper, were a few crumbs. 'My good woman,' said Mr Charrington [one of the mission's members], 'why don't you open the window?' 'Oh,' she replied, 'you would not say that if you had nothing to eat and had no fire to warm you.' The family was relieved.

== Arab interests ==
Keith-Falconer taught himself Hebrew at Harrow and then moved on to other Semitic languages. At Cambridge he studied for a Semitic languages tripos, studying Hebrew, Arabic and Syriac. He required a deep knowledge of the Hebrew Bible. He passed.

Keith-Falconer continued his study of Arabic in Germany, as much to perfect speaking German as deepen his knowledge of Arabia. He stayed at Leipzig for five months of 1881. That year he met General Gordon, who on 25 April 1881 wrote to him from Southampton:

My dear Mr Keith-Falconer

I only wish I could put you into something that would give you the work you need, viz. secular and religious work, running side by side. This is the proper work for man and I think you could find it. Would you like to go to Stamboul (Istanbul) as extra unpaid attaché to Lord Dufferin; if so, why not try it, or else as private secretary to Saint Petersburg? If not, will you then come to me in Syria to the Hermitage? Believe me with kind regards, yours faithfully C. G. Gordon.

In October, Keith-Falconer left for Assiout, 350 km from Cairo, on the Nile. It was the most distant point of the Egyptian railway. His first impressions were poor. On 20 November he wrote:

The dust – I shall never forget it. I tried to read Dozy's Islamisme but in a short time the book and I got so filthy with the dust, that I became irritable and uncomfortable and could not read... There are a number of Greeks in Egypt and they dislike anything like manual labour, preferring to keep shops, and especially restaurants and hotels. Dr Hogg (his host] is a first-rate Arabist. He preaches in Arabic perfectly fluently. He teaches his students in Arabic, including the Sol-Fa class. (The Arabs have wretched ears, and Dr Hogg tells me that it was only by means of the Sol-Fa that he could get anything like music out of them.)

On 30 November he wrote:

I am disappointed with Egypt, both as to scenery and climate. It is a vile place for catching cold. Buildings seem constructed with a view to as many draughts as possible... The [sic?] are no bells. This is the greatest drawback of all. You have to go outside your door and clap your hands, and when you have repeated this performance five or six times, the Arab may begin to have a suspicion that somebody wants him; and when you at last get him, it will be very wonderful if he does what you want.

He went back to Europe.

== Land's End to John o' Groats ==
It was on returning to England that he made a second attempt on the long-distance record. He kept a diary which appeared in a newspaper in Aberdeen and in The London Bicycle Club Gazette. On his first day he rode into sweeping rain near Bodmin.

Heavy rain was now falling and necessitated an hour's halt. I had not got six miles out of Bodmin when a second and more violent storm of rain and mist gave me a bath all for nothing. So I pulled up again at a lonely village called Jamaica... Here I sat for five and a half weary hours at a little temperance inn, for there is no public-house in Jamaica. A copy of Butler's Dissertation on Virtue, which I found here, served, I hope, to reconcile me to the weather...

Third day. During the ride through Somerton (171) to Glastonbury (183), I became the victim first of stupidity, then of malice. A waggoner seeing me about to overtake him pulled very suddenly to the wrong side, and sent me sprawling over a heap of flints. No harm done. Shortly after that a wilful misdirection given to me by a playful Somersetian sent me 2½ miles in the wrong direction, so that I traversed 12 instead of seven miles between Somerton and Glastonbury. Wells Cathedral (188) was one of the few sights I lingered to see. It is gorgeous.

Fifth day: Sunshine and rain alternated rapidly until the afternoon... The last 10 miles were done in the dark, rendered more intense by the rain-clouds. To ride along a stone road on a dark, rainy night is a most severe trial of nerve and temper. One cannot see the stones to avoid them, and each time the wheel goes over one, the machine is jerked up or thrust to one side, and the rider gets a shake that makes his heart jump into his mouth.

Sixth day: On emerging from the hotel I found to my horror that a furious north-west wind was blowing. I struggled on as far as Doncaster (412), when I became sick of fighting against that strong man, and threw up the sponge. After a good dinner at the Reindeer, I went to bed for a couple of hours, expecting that the wind would lull in the evening – it did so, but of course the road got bad then. A wet, greasy oölite road rendered more delightful by the recent gyrations of a feathery traction-engine, is a treat not soon forgotten by the bicyclist.

Eleventh day: To-day was a failure. After passing Blair Atholl (756), the glen becomes rapidly higher and narrower. The wind came sweeping down as though through a funnel... Another walking tour. After three miles my foot began to complain. At Dulnacardoch I was in such pain that I was obliged to invade a farm-house and ask for rest and food.

Thirteenth and last day: I rose to find my foot horribly stiff and painful. But the day was fine, no wind, and only 110 miles more to run... After refreshing and nursing myself at the Station Hotel [Wick, at midnight], I started again, to the blank astonishment of landlord, boots and waiters. The utter solitude, stillness and dreariness of the remaining 19 miles made a most remarkable impression on me. No one tree, bush or hedge did I see the whole way. At twenty minutes past three I stood stiff, sore and hungry before John O'Groats Hotel. I had ridden 994 miles in 13 days less 45 minutes. I had no difficulty rousing the landlord, and was soon asleep.

== Aden ==
Keith-Falconer chose Aden for his missionary work after reading an article by General Haig, whom he went to see in London. Haig had urged the Church Missionary Society to establish a mission there. There were reports that children attending the Roman Catholic mission returned to Islam on leaving.

Keith-Falconer visited Aden in November 1885 for a six-month trial. On 18 November he wrote to his mother:

I doubt whether anyone could leave here long without a weakening of all his faculties. I read Arabic for several hours a day, and a native fikih, or schoolmaster, comes daily to instruct me. Aden is not without its disadvantages as a mission station. The climate is very enervating and at the same time there is no hill-station anywhere near for the missionaries to go and recruit; but possibly after time such a hill-station will be opened. The relations between the English and the neighbouring tribes become more satisfactory as time goes on.

He and his wife first lived near Crater Pass, overlooking Crater City. He distributed scriptures in the town and read publicly from an Arabic Bible. He then moved to Sheikh Othman, which had wells, a better climate and access to the interior by camel trails.

In November 1886 Keith-Falconer and his wife returned to Aden definitively. He had the support of the Free Church to establish an orphanage and the help of a Glasgow physician, Stewart Corwen. They lived in a house with a walled garden. Alongside it was a hut in which Corwen saw his patients. On 22 February 1887 Keith-Falconer wrote about catching malaria, which he called Aden fever:

I never felt so utterly miserable in all my life... One of our Somali servants has had it as well, but coupled with a great deal of shivering... Quinine is quite useless in this fever, one must simply grin and bear it.

He had repeated occurrences of malaria, speaking of "the long spell of fever which both my wife and I have been through", then that "our illness has thrown us back in every way", later that "I have been suffering from remitting fever; for twelve weary weeks, on my back a useless invalid."

Finally, his biographer wrote:

It was almost exactly six months after the young missionary, full of keen hopes and joyous anticipations, had left England for the East, that the telegram told the unlooked-for news of his death and his burial amid the scene of his labours... That warm, loving heart, that keen, active brain, were, for this world, at rest.

== Personal life and death ==
Keith-Falconer married Gwendolen Bevan, daughter of the banker Robert Cooper Lee Bevan, in Cannes on 4 March 1884. They had their honeymoon in southern France and in Italy, where they inspected the remains of Pompeii before moving to 5 Salisbury Villas, Station Road, Cambridge.

He died in Aden after repeated bouts of malaria for which there was no cure. He was 30. A memorial church to him there opened 10 years later. He is buried in Holkat Bay cemetery. The Scottish Mission school and hospital at Sheikh Othman continued until the independence of South Yemen in 1967.

The foreword by the Rev Robert Sinker, librarian of Trinity College, Cambridge, to his biography, Memorials of the Hon Ion Keith-Falconer MA says:

A career of exceptional promise was early closed in the death of Ion Keith-Falconer. The beauty of his character, his ardent missionary zeal, his great learning, form a combination rarely equalled... How noble a life his was, how unselfish, how worthy to be loved, those who knew him know well; how hard it is to adequately set forth, on the one hand, its harmonious beauty, on the other, the rich variety of its aspects, I am very fully conscious.

== Bibliography ==
- Keith-Falconer, I.G.N., Kalilah and Dimnah, or, The Fables of Bidpai : being an account of their literary history / with an English translation of the later Syriac version of the same, and notes, Cambridge : University Press, (1885)
- Sinker, Robert, Memorials of the Hon. Ion Keith-Falconer, M.A. : late Lord Almoner's Professor of Arabic in the University of Cambridge, and missionary to the Mohammedans of Southern Arabia, Cambridge : Deighton, Bell and Co., (1888)
- Robson, James, Ion Keith-Falconer of Arabia, London: Hodder & Stoughton, (1923)
- Sons of the Covenant, by Marcus Lawrence Loane, Archbishop of Sydney. Sydney: Angus & Robertson (1963)
- James McLaren Ritchie: The Church of Scotland South Arabia Mission 1885–1978: a history and critical evaluation of the mission founded by Ion Keith Falconer's vision. Tentmakers Publications, Stoke-on-Trent, 2006. ISBN 1-901670-18-X
