= Emil Zimmermann =

East German slalom canoeist

Medal record

Men's canoe slalom

Representing East Germany

World Championships
Silver medal – second place	1957 Augsburg	C-1
Silver medal – second place	1957 Augsburg	C-1 team

Emil Zimmermann is a retired East German slalom canoeist who competed from the mid-1950s to the early 1960s. He won two silver medals at the 1957 ICF Canoe Slalom World Championships in Augsburg, earning them in the C-1 event and the C-1 team event.
