= Harry Ford (Australian footballer) =

Australian rules footballer (1884–1957)

Personal information
- Full name: Henry William Ford
- Born: 11 June 1884; Carlton, Victoria
- Died: 26 November 1957 (aged 73); Fitzroy, Victoria

Playing career^{1}
Years	Club	Games (Goals)
1902	Essendon	2 (0)
- ^{1} Playing statistics correct to the end of 1902.

Henry William Ford (11 June 1884 – 26 November 1957) was an Australian rules footballer who played with Essendon in the Victorian Football League (VFL).
