= Samuel Gauntlett =

Samuel Gauntlett, DD (1745–1822) was Warden of New College, Oxford, from 1792 until his death.

Gauntlett matriculated at Trinity College, Oxford, in 1762. He then migrated to New College, where he graduated BA in 1767, MA in 1771 and BD in 1794.

Academic offices
Preceded by John Oglander	Warden of New College, Oxford; 1792–1822	Succeeded by Philip Nicholas Shuttleworth
