= Philip Shuttleworth =

English churchman and academic

The Right Reverend Philip Shuttleworth
- Bishop of Chichester
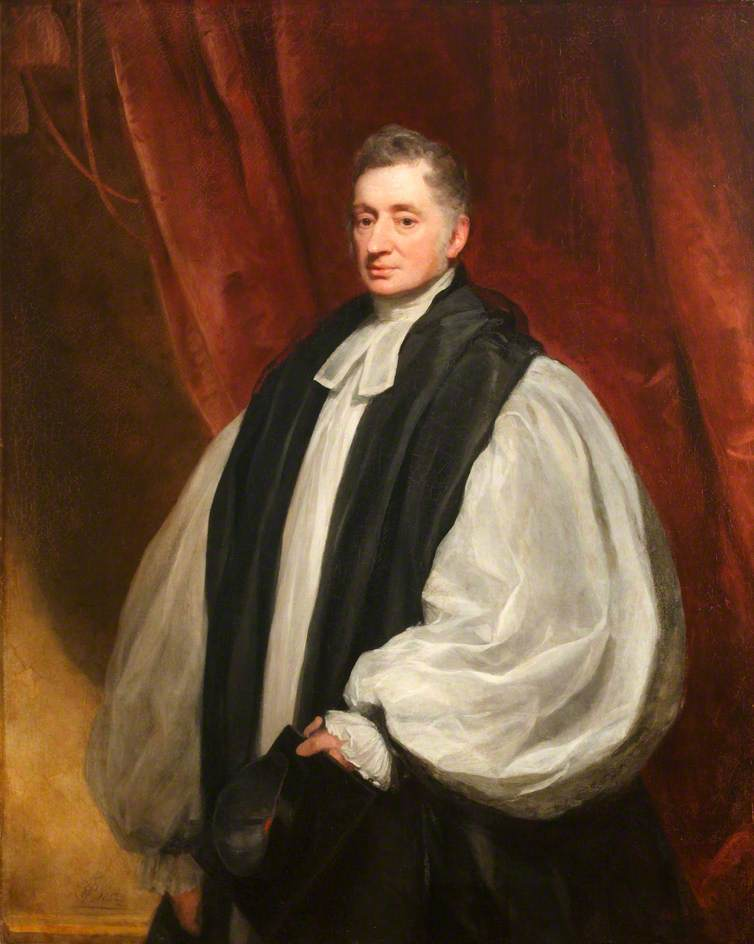
- Church: Church of England
- Diocese: Diocese of Chichester
- Elected: 1840
- Term ended: 1842 (death)
- Predecessor: William Otter
- Successor: Ashurst Gilbert

Personal details
- Born: 9 February 1782 Kirkham, Lancashire
- Died: 7 January 1842 (aged 59) Bishop's Palace, Chichester
- Denomination: Anglican
- Spouse: Emma Martha Welch (m.1823)
- Education: Winchester College
- Alma mater: New College, Oxford

Philip Nicholas Shuttleworth (9 February 1782 – 7 January 1842) was an English churchman and academic, Warden of New College, Oxford, from 1822 and Bishop of Chichester.

== Life ==
Philip Shuttleworth was second son of Humphrey Shuttleworth, vicar of Kirkham in Lancashire from 1771 to 1812, and of Preston from 1784 to 1809, an anti-papal writer. Shuttleworth, born at Kirkham on 9 February 1782, was educated at the Preston grammar school, and at Winchester College, which he entered in 1796. He matriculated at New College, Oxford, on 24 December 1800, and graduated B.A. in 1800, M.A. in 1811, and B.D. and D.D. in 1822. In 1803 he won the Chancellor's Latin-verse prize, the subject being 'Byzantium.'

Soon after graduating he became tutor to the Hon. Algernon Herbert, and at a subsequent date to Charles Richard Fox, son of Henry Vassall-Fox, 3rd Baron Holland. He was Tutor and Fellow of New College until 1822, and proctor of the university in 1820. In 1822, he was unanimously chosen Warden of New College. He held strong whig views, which were toned down in later life, and was an opponent of the tractarian movement.

On 19 November 1824, he was presented by Lord Holland to the rectory of Foxley, Wiltshire, and in September 1840 was appointed bishop of Chichester. He died at his palace at Chichester on 7 January 1842. He married at Hambleton, Buckinghamshire, in 1823, Emma Martha, daughter of George Welch of High Leek in Tunstal parish, Lancashire. By her he had five daughters, one of whom as Frances Bevan the translator and poet. A son, Philip Ughtred, died as a student of Christ Church, Oxford, on 27 November 1848.

== Works ==
He wrote occasional verse, some of which appears in the Gentleman's Magazine for 1861, and in Elizabeth Oak Gordon's Life of William Buckland, 1891. His playful "Specimen of a Geological Lecture" is given in Charles Daubeny's Fugitive Poems connected with Natural History and Physical Science, 1869.

Shuttleworth published, besides separate sermons:

- Sermons on some of the leading Principles of Christianity, 2 vols, 1827–34; 3rd edition 1840.
- A Paraphrastic Translation of the Apostolic Epistles, with Notes, 1829; 5th edition 1854.
- The Consistency of the Whole Scheme of Revelation with itself, and with Human Reason, 1832.
- Not Tradition but Scripture, 1838, opposed to the Oxford tracts.
- Three Sermons before the University of Oxford, 1840.

Academic offices
| Preceded by Samuel Gauntlett | Warden of New College, Oxford; 1822–1840 | Succeeded by David Williams |
Church of England titles
| Preceded by William Otter | Bishop of Chichester; 1840–1842 | Succeeded by Ashurst Gilbert |
