= Lord Almoner's Professor of Arabic =

Professorships at Oxford and Cambridge

The Lord Almoner's Professorships of Arabic were two professorships, one at the University of Oxford and one at the University of Cambridge. They were both founded before 1724, but records of the holders of the chairs only date from that year. The professors were appointed by the Crown and their salaries (£50 a year each) were paid by the Crown by a grant to the Lord Almoner. The Crown ceased to appoint the professors in 1903.

Both universities had existing chairs in Arabic, the Laudian Professorship at Oxford and Sir Thomas Adams's Professorship at Cambridge.

== Oxford ==
At Oxford the chair, although endowed for the teaching of Arabic, was sometimes used for teaching Hebrew, and sometimes held by the same person as the Laudian Professor.

The chair was discontinued on the retirement of the incumbent in 1909.

== Cambridge ==
At Cambridge the chair was initially founded as a readership. Before it was upgraded to a professorship before or in 1815 it was usually combined with the Sir Thomas Adams's Professor of Arabic chair and held by the same person.

The chair, "which for two centuries" had "a distinguished record, but carried only a nominal stipend", was discontinued on the death of the incumbent, Professor Anthony Ashley Bevan, in 1933.

=== Lord Almoner's Readers ===
- David Wilkins (1724)
- Leonard Chappelow (1729)
- Samuel Hallifax (1768)
- William Craven (1770)

=== Lord Almoner's Professors ===
- George Cecil Renouard (1815–1821)
- Thomas Musgrave (1821)
- Thomas Robinson (1837–1854)
- Theodore Preston (1855)
- Edward Henry Palmer (1871–1882)
- William Robertson Smith (1883)
- Ion Grant Neville Keith-Falconer (1886)
- Robert Lubbock Bensly (1887)
- Anthony Ashley Bevan (1893) - contributor to the Encyclopaedia Biblica
