= Henry Bigg =

Administrator at the University of Oxford

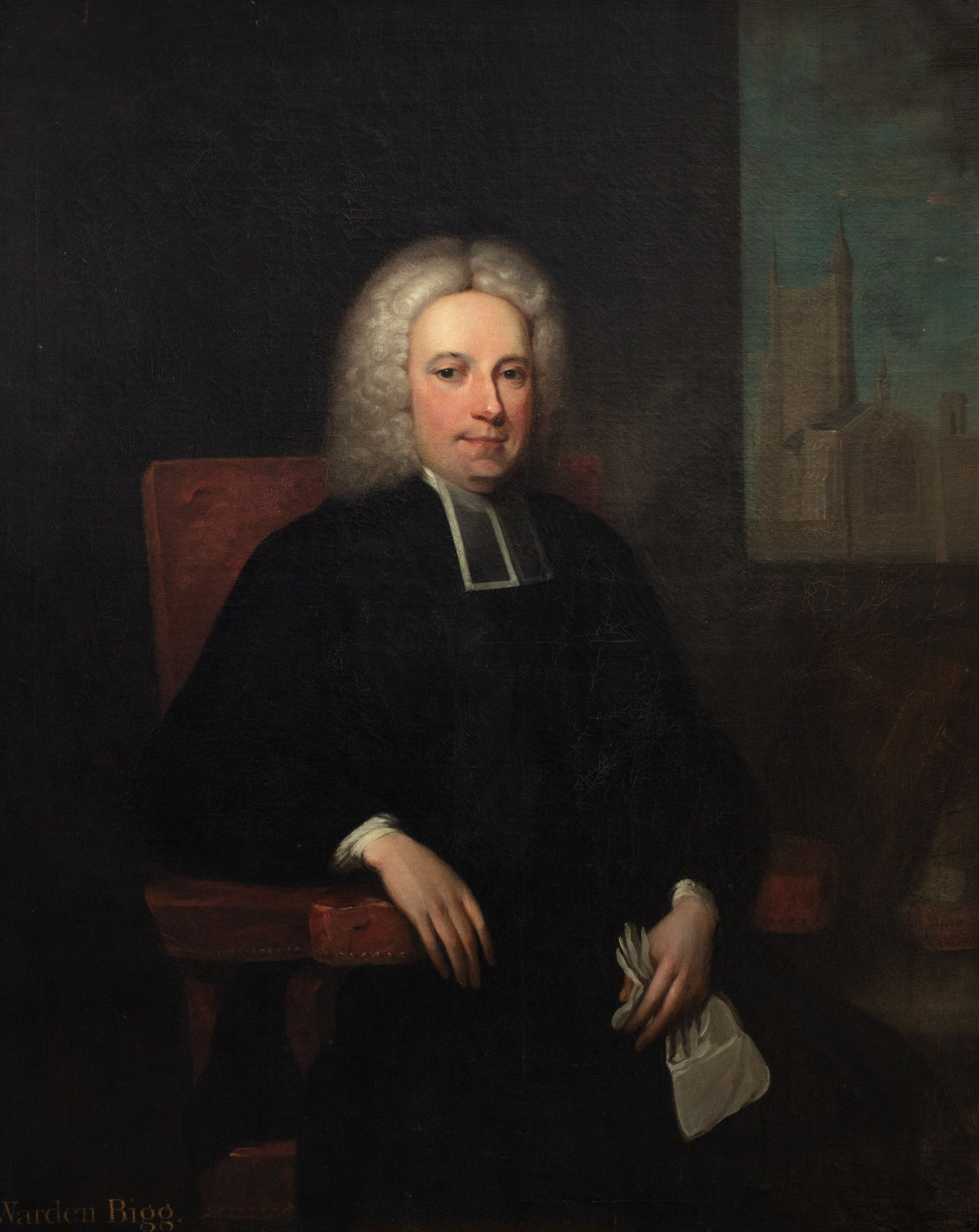
Henry Bigg

Henry Bigg D.D. (1690–1740) was an English academic administrator at the University of Oxford.

== Childhood ==
Henry was the son of Lovelace Bigg of Chilton Park at Chilton Foliat in Wiltshire and Dorothy, the daughter of William Wither of Manydown at Wootton St Lawrence in Hampshire. He was born at Chilton Foliat in 1690.

== Career ==
He was educated at New College, Oxford where he was Warden from 1724 to 1729. He held incumbencies at Worting in Hampshire and Farnborough in Berkshire. He married Katherine, the daughter of Roger Garnam of Prior's Court at Curridge in Berkshire but had no children. He died at Farnborough in 1740.
