= Architecture of Winchester College =

History of the school's buildings

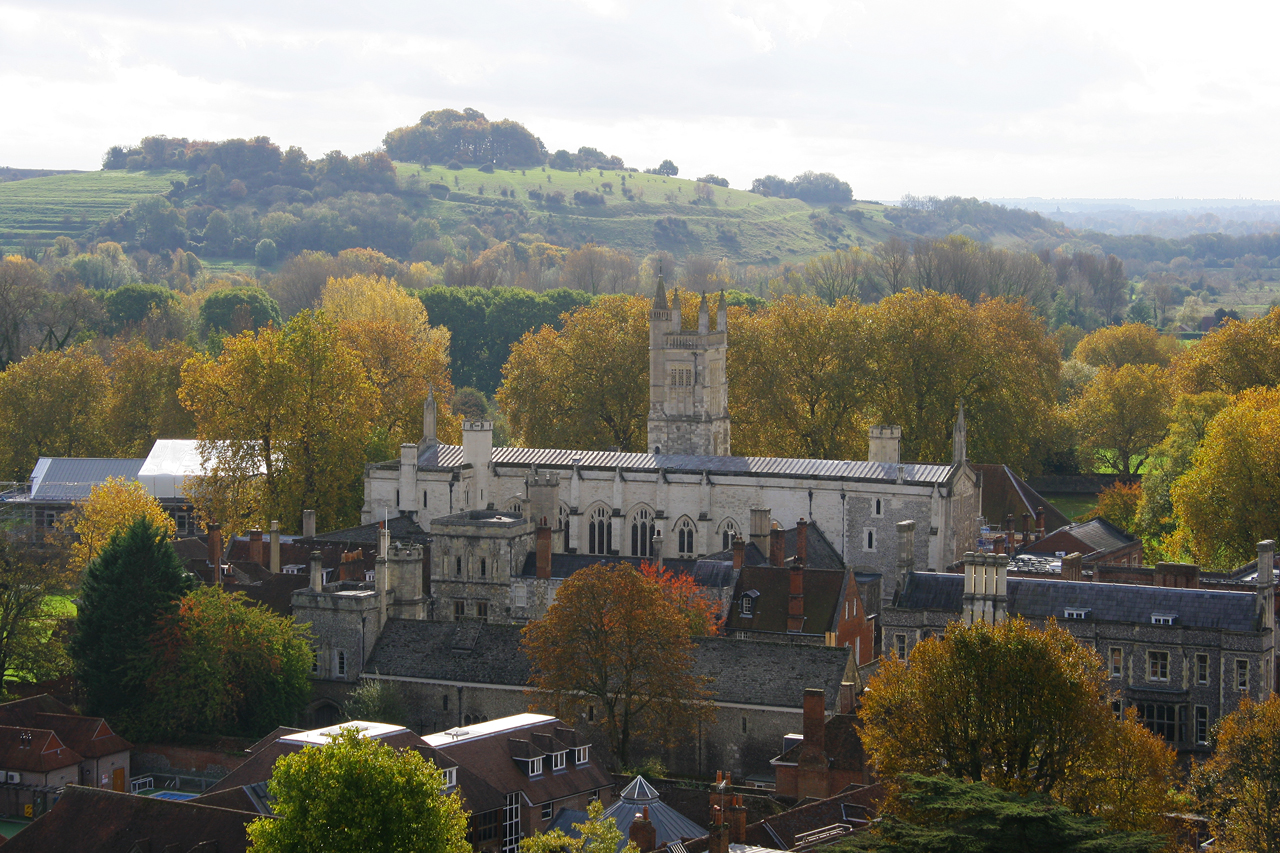
St Catherine's Hill and part of Winchester College, looking southeast from the tower of Winchester Cathedral. Chapel and its tower are in the centre, with the buildings of Chamber Court and Outer Court below them; the Warden's Lodging is partly masked by trees on the left, while the Headmaster's House is on the right. St Catherine's Hill, owned by the school, is in the background.

Winchester College is an English independent boarding school for pupils aged 13 to 18. Its original medieval buildings from the 1382 foundation remain largely intact, but they have been supplemented by multiple episodes of construction. Additions were made in the medieval and early modern periods. There was a major expansion of boarding accommodation in the Victorian era; further teaching areas were constructed at the turn of the 20th century and more recently.

Among the styles in the architecture of the college are Perpendicular Gothic, Christopher Wren, Brunelleschi, Queen Anne revival, and High Victorian Baronial. Among the architects whose work is represented in the ensemble are William Wynford, William Butterfield, G. S. Repton, G. E. Street, William White, Basil Champneys, E. S. Prior, Herbert Baker, Henry L. G. Hill, and Peter Shepheard. The school has numerous listed buildings, historic structures protected by law, including the medieval buildings and the 1924 War Cloister.

== Overview ==
Sketch map of Winchester College, with clickable links, showing the major buildings and its position relative to the city, the cathedral, and St Catherine's Hill. All locations and building outlines are diagrammatic.

Winchester College was founded by William of Wykeham in 1382. He was a wealthy and powerful figure, as he was both Bishop of Winchester and Chancellor of England. The foundation was for a school to enable 70 boys, sons of poor clergymen, to have a free education; they might go on to have a university education the school's sister foundation, New College, Oxford. The first 70 poor scholars entered the school in 1394. The school still has 70 scholars, and they are still housed in the medieval buildings. The scholars have been joined by a larger number of other pupils, known as commoners, housed in Victorian era boarding houses.

The foundation buildings are situated just south of Winchester's Cathedral Close and bordering a branch of the River Itchen. These have been supplemented by several later buildings. There are teaching buildings near the foundation, including the 17th-century School and the 19th-century Flint Court. Further to the south are the 19th century Museum, intended as a teaching space for arts and sciences, and the 20th century Science School. To the west of Kingsgate Street is a cluster of ten mainly 19th-century boarding houses for the commoners. Other buildings including the War Cloister, the Sanatorium, and the Southern Campus for sports, lie to the southwest of the foundation buildings. The school is set in extensive grounds to the south, including the Meads playing fields, water meadows by the river, and St Catherine's Hill to the southeast. Several are listed buildings; (Note: A detailed map of the listings in the school can be seen by zooming in on the Historic England map on their website.) (Note: The listed buildings include: Chapel: 1350684; College Hall: 1095484; Chamber Court: 1296879; Warden's Lodgings: 1167489; Outer Court: 1095483; Cloisters: 1296887; Fromond's Chantry: 1095485; School: 1167544; College Mill: 1296819; Mill House, The Wharf: 1388258; Moberly Court and Flint Court: 1095490; Headmaster's House: 1296847; Sergeants: 1389672; Du Boulays: 1389673; Chernocke House: 1389671; War Cloister: 1095486; South Africa Gateway and adjoining buildings: 1296843; Memorial Buildings [Museum]: 1167595; Sick House [Bethesda]: 1350685; Church of St Michael: 1350710; Science School: 1389670; Music School: 1296290; New Hall: 1296802) there are 18 Grade I, 6 Grade II* and over 70 Grade II listings, including many of the houses on both sides of Kingsgate Street, and some further south on Kingsgate Road. The medieval core buildings have been described as "all ... of rare significance". The joint foundation with New College represents a religious, educational, and architectural endowment with "no obvious European precedent"; in 1441, King Henry VI followed the example to create the matching pair of Eton College and King's College, Cambridge.

== The medieval foundation ==
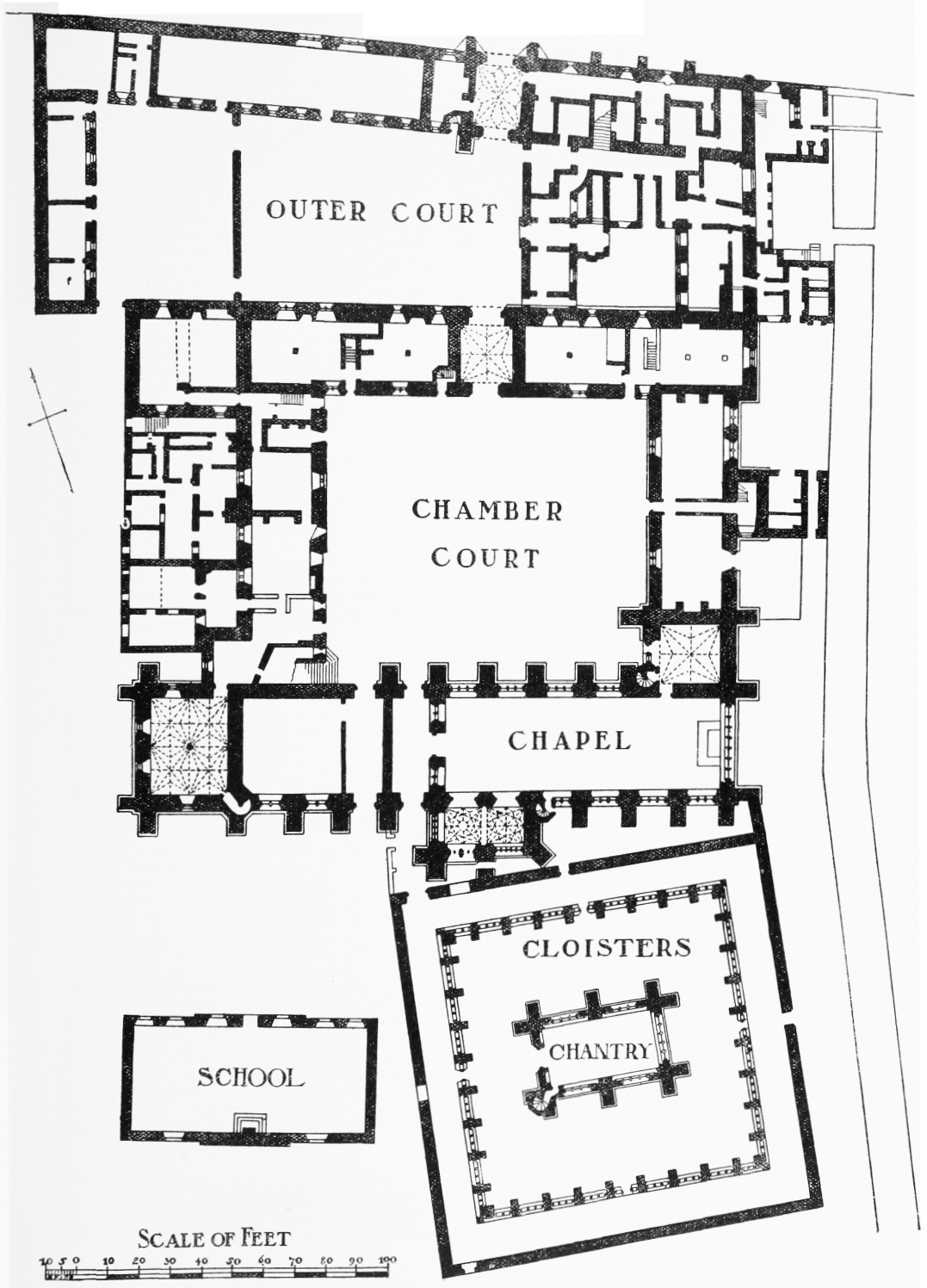
Plan of the school's medieval and Early Modern buildings. Outer Court, Chamber Court, Chapel, and Cloisters are 14th century; (Fromond's) Chantry is 15th century; School is 17th century.

The medieval buildings, representing most of the original foundation from the school's opening in 1394, include Outer Gate and Outer Court, Chamber Court, the Chapel, and the Cloisters. Most are built using flint with limestone facings and slate roofs; the Chapel is mostly in "green Ventnor stone". The buildings were designed in the Perpendicular Gothic style of the English late medieval period by William Wynford, the master mason who designed New College, Oxford. The two teaching institutions were the first in England to have layouts planned on a large scale. Outer Gate has a handsome star-shaped lierne vault, described by the architectural historian Nikolaus Pevsner as "out-of-the-ordinary", such decoration usually being confined to churches. Outer Court is mainly medieval, but the east side is formed by the architect G. S. Repton's 1832–1833 reworking of the Warden's Lodgings in knapped flint laid in regular courses. The west side was once extended, but is now closed by a screen with a 1663 archway. Doors lead to the former stables, brewhouse and slaughterhouse; the architect Herbert Baker transformed the brewhouse into the Moberly Library in 1932–1934. The Cloisters have Italianate wagon roofs and bare external walls; the inside walls have gothic arched openings, each divided into three lights. The structure is at an angle to the rest of the medieval buildings to fit the shape of the site.

The south side of Chamber Court is formed by the chapel of St. Mary, known simply as "Chapel". It retains its original wooden fan-vaulted ceiling, designed by Hugh Herland, carpenter to Richard II. The college's dining hall, known as "Hall", is housed in the same range of buildings in ashlar stonework, on the first floor to the west of Chapel. Hall has wooden panelling, installed in 1540. The four-stage tower, visible from all around the college, was demolished and rebuilt in 1862–1863.

The chapel is known for its stained glass. The East window depicts the Tree of Jesse. Down the chapel's north and south sides is a collection of saints. Little of the original medieval glass, designed by Thomas Glazier, survives. A firm of glaziers in Shrewsbury, Betton and Evans, was tasked with cleaning the glass in the 1820s. At that time there was no known process for cleaning the badly deteriorated glass and so it was copied, while most of the original glass was scattered or destroyed. Some pieces have been recovered. The art historian and Old Wykehamist, Kenneth Clark, bought back the Tree of Jesse section of the east window, now housed in Thurburn's Chantry (1473–1485), at the back of the chapel. Further figures have been returned; they form the east window of Fromond's Chantry, inside the Cloisters. The pews, choir stalls, and panelling inside the chapel were designed by the ecclesiastical architect W. D. Caröe and made between 1913 and 1921, while the stall ends and misericords are from the medieval foundation.

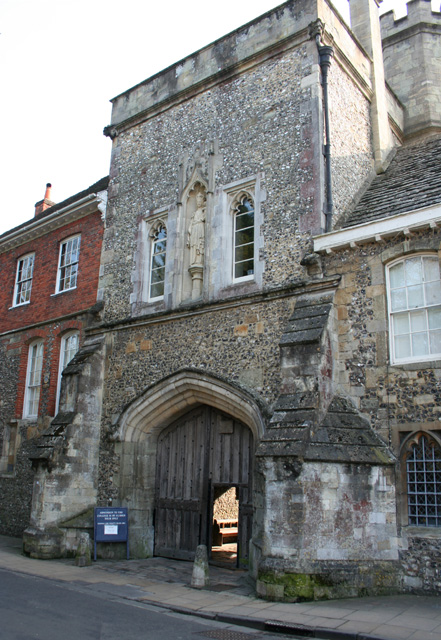
Outer Gate, College Street, 1394

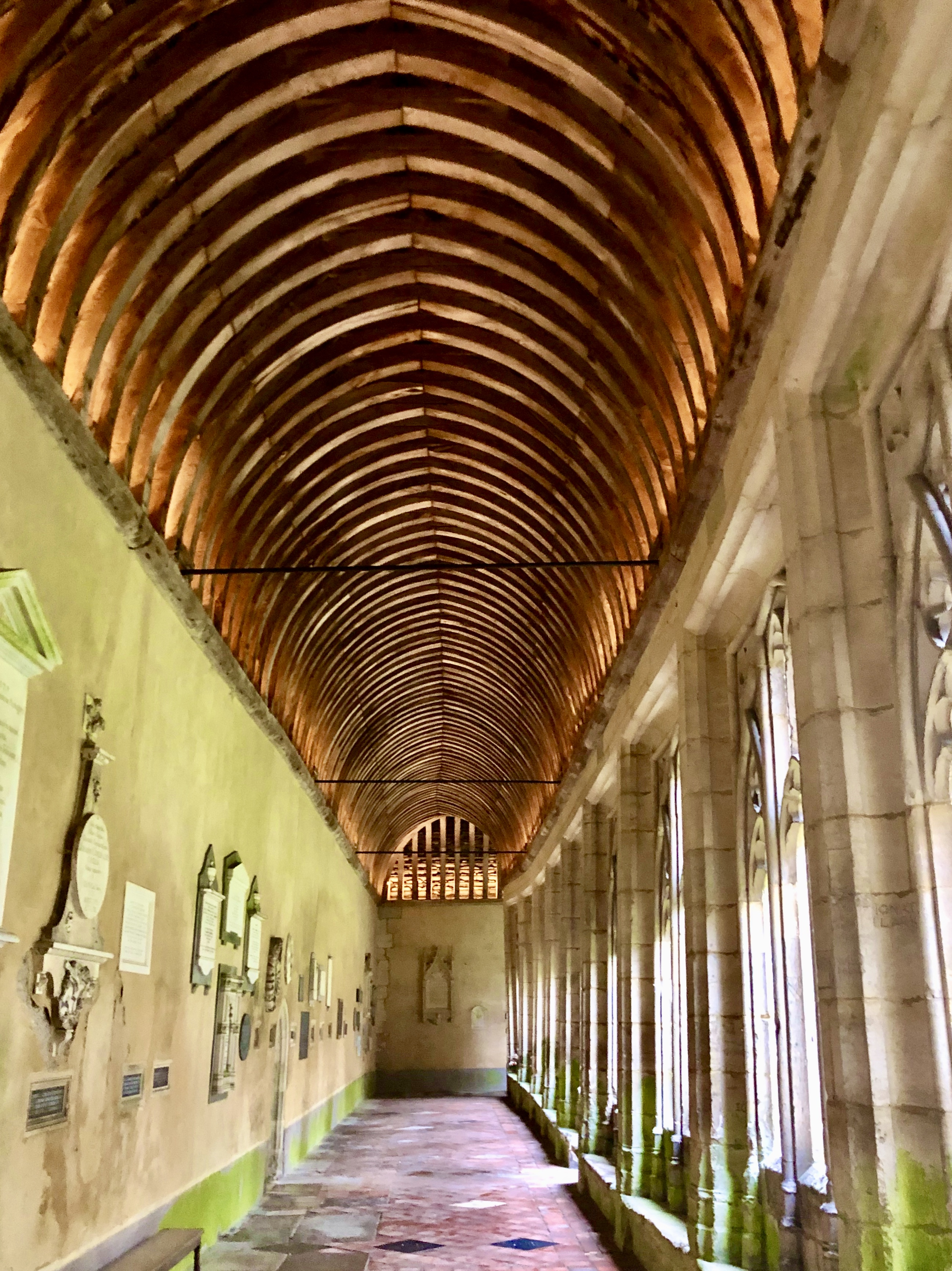
The Cloisters, 1394

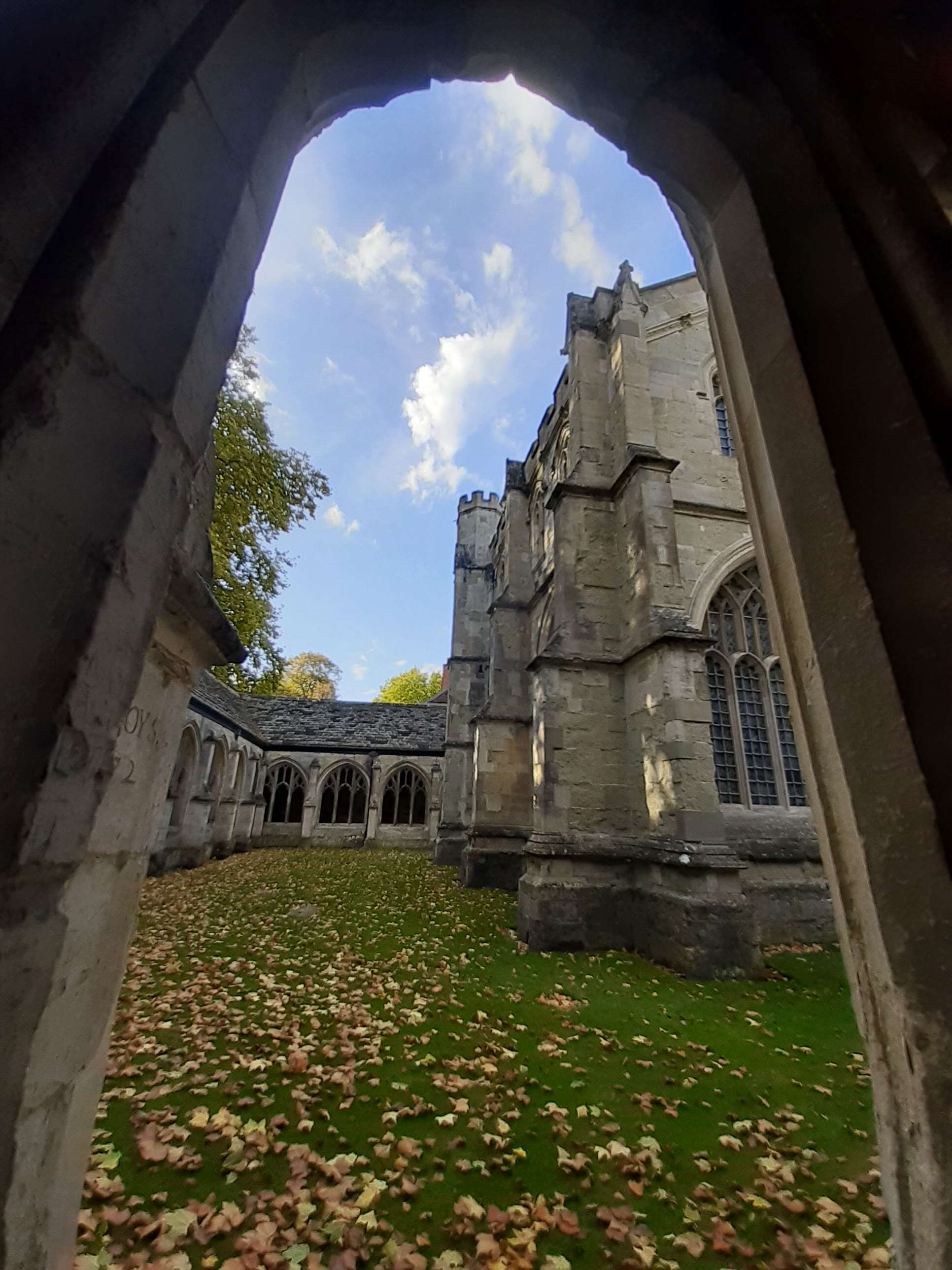
Fromond's Chantry inside Cloisters

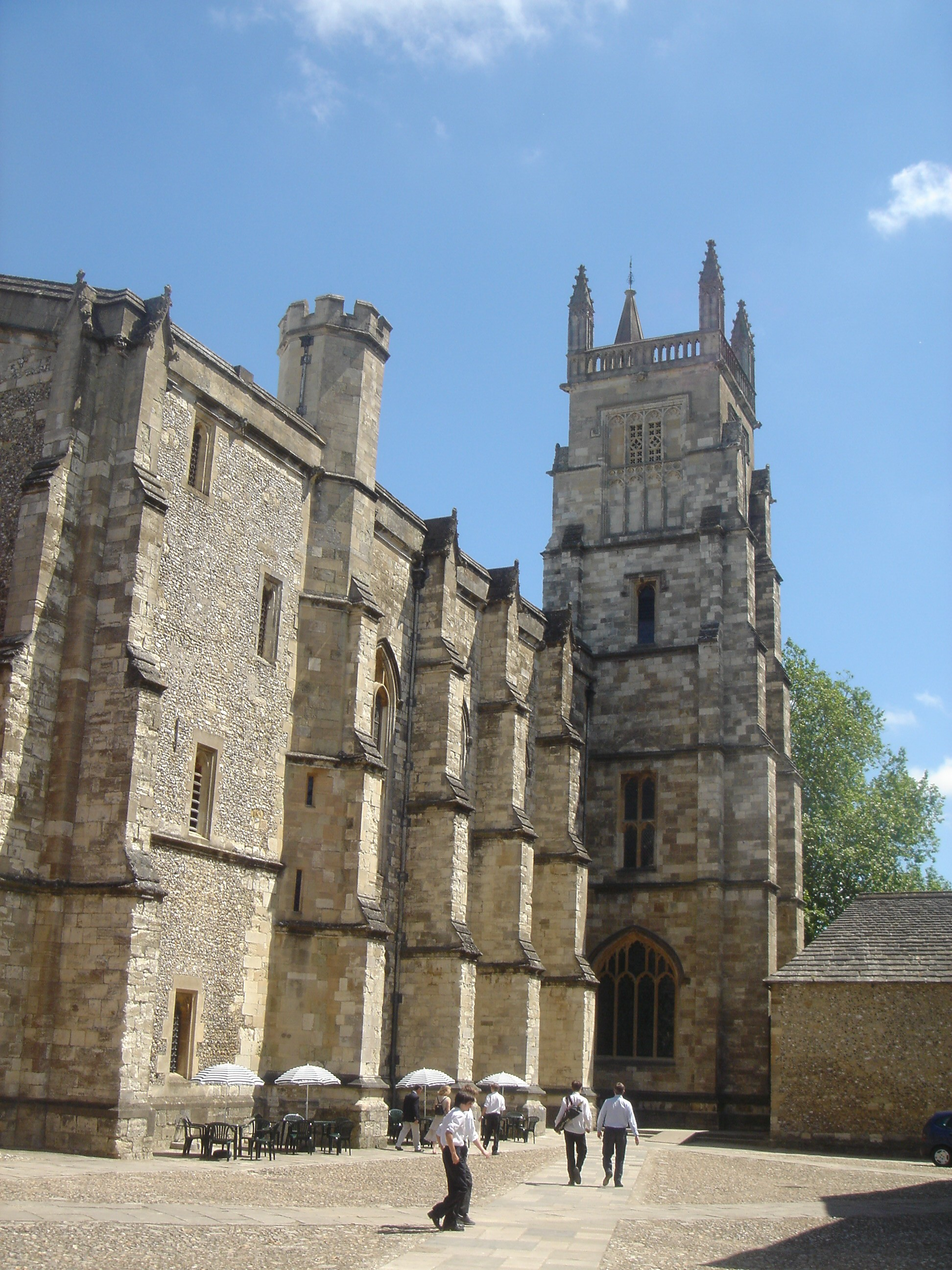
Hall and Chapel, south side, cloisters on right

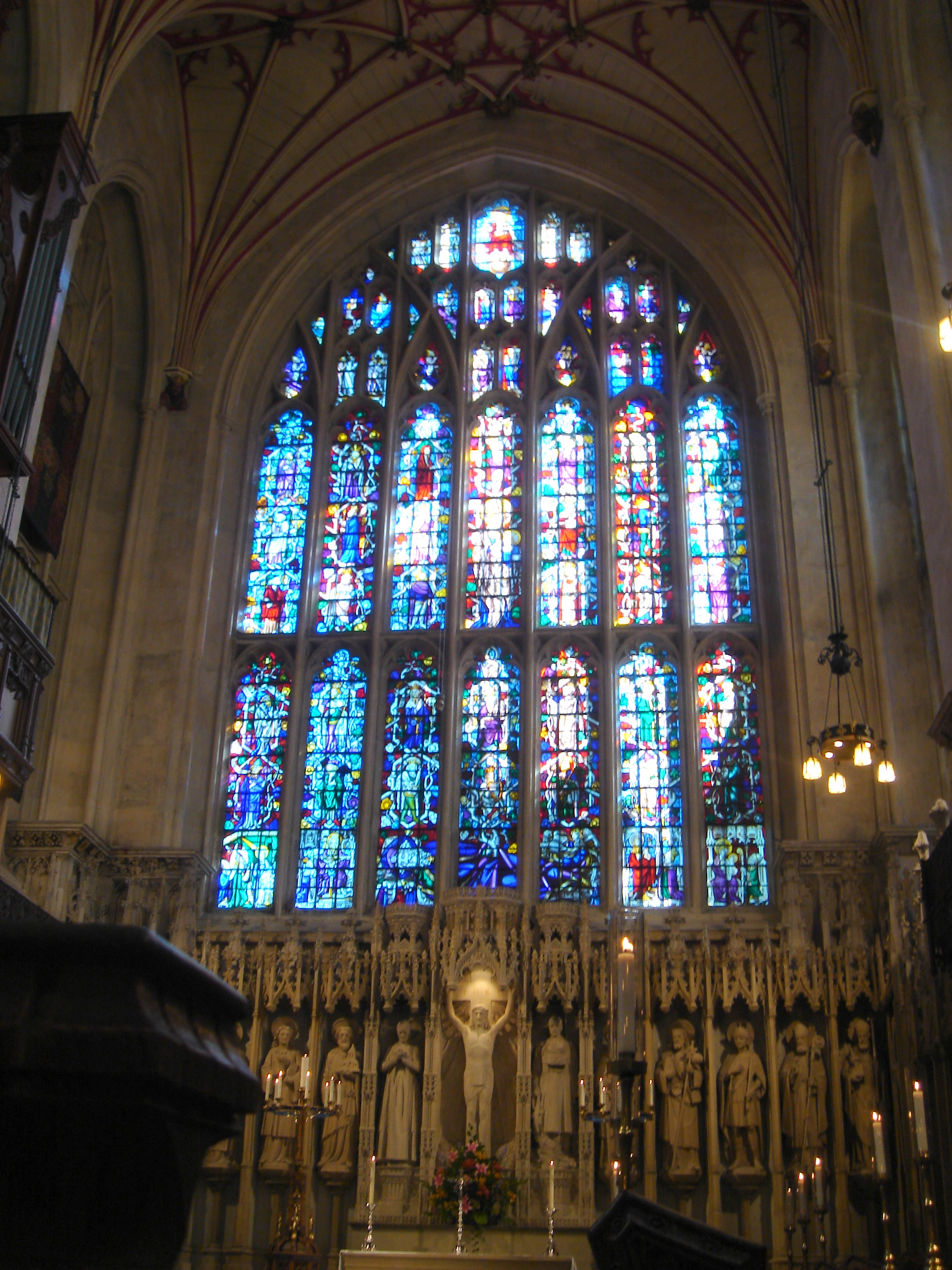
Chapel's east window with Victorian stained glass

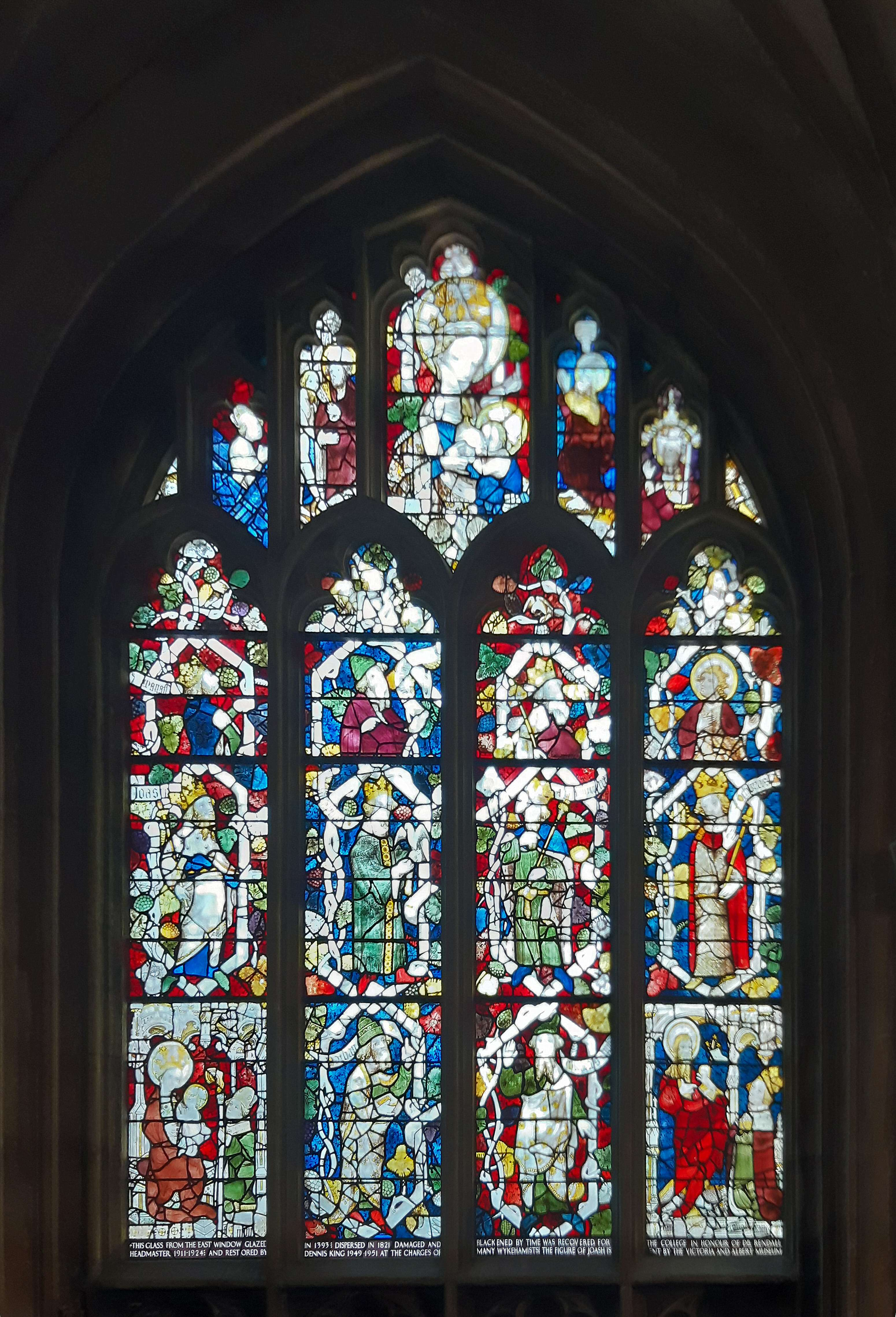
Medieval glass from Chapel in Thurburn's Chantry
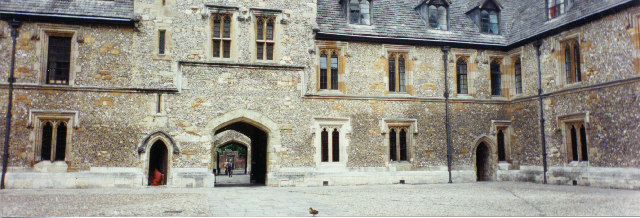
Chamber Court, 1394, looking through Middle Gate to Outer Court and Outer Gate

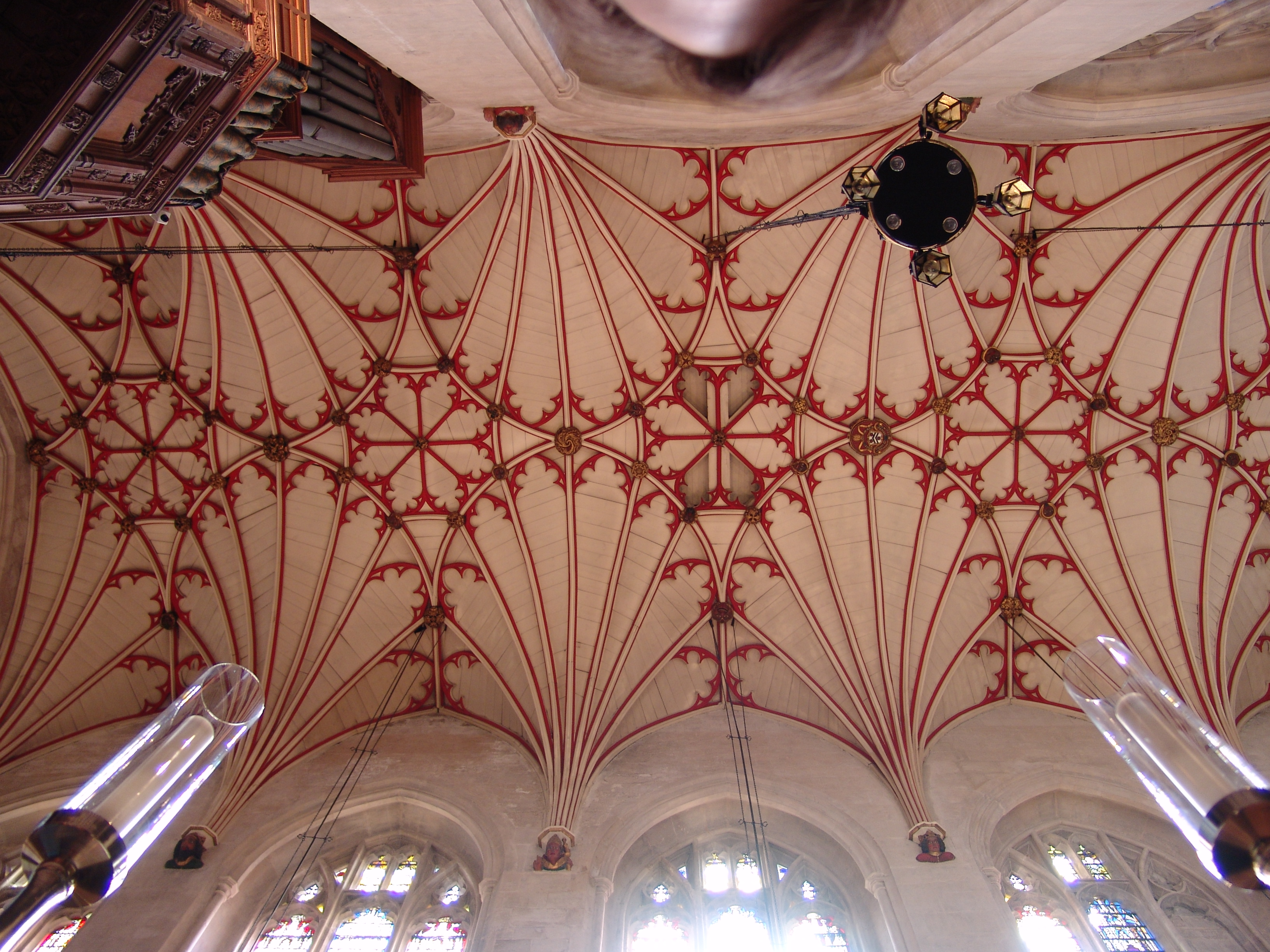
Chapel ceiling

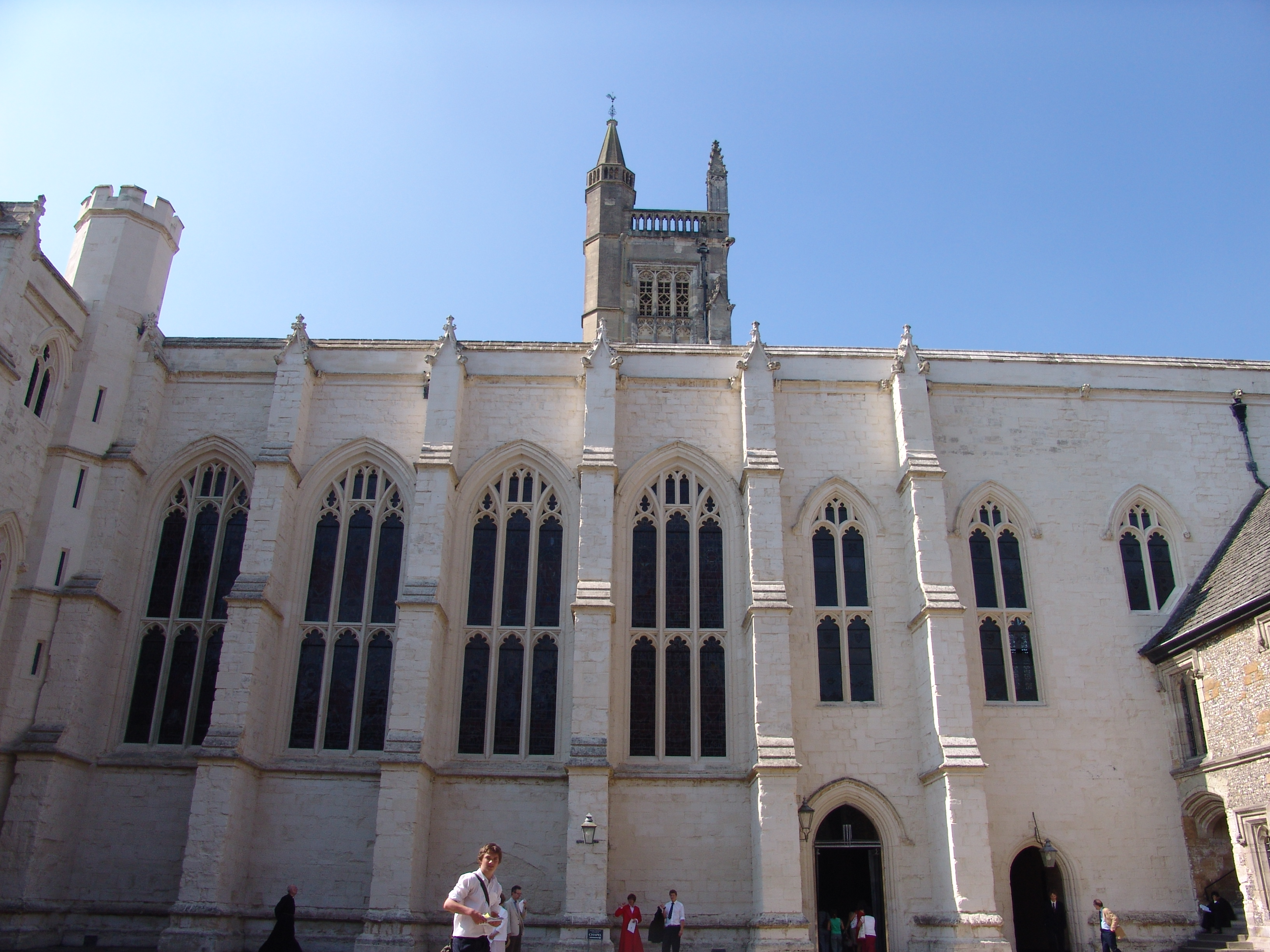
North side of Chapel, facing Chamber Court

== Medieval to early modern ==
Later buildings include Fromond's Chantry, built inside the Cloisters after 1420. The Warden's Lodgings is constructed largely of red brick; the oldest parts were built in 1597. The face North on to College Street has its lower part in flint with stone buttresses, the upper part with lightly-arched windows dated to 1730. A chimneypiece in the house is dated 1615.

In the early modern period, the College Sick House was built by the school's warden (chairman of governors) John Harris in 1656–1657. Harris named it Bethesda after the biblical Pool of Bethesda, a place of healing, and had the name "בת'סדה" ("Bethesda, house of mercy") inscribed in Hebrew above the door. It now serves as a staff common room. It is constructed mainly of brick with mullioned windows; the front has two large gables, flanking a smaller central gable that projects forward, housing the door.

Warden John Nicholas extended and adapted buildings around the College. He had Chapel decorated with fine oak panelling in 1680–1683. Soon afterwards, in 1683–1687, he had the building called "School" constructed in the English baroque Wren style. Above the door is a 1692 statue of the college's founder William of Wykeham, by the Danish sculptor C. G. Cibber. The building is of red brick with stone facings, carved modillions, and a hipped roof. The front has seven bays, of which the central three are under a large triangular pediment. Pevsner notes the "very fine" stone garlands above the arched windows. That same year, Nicholas had the East face of the Warden's Lodgings (looking on to the Warden's gardens and the River Itchen) reworked.

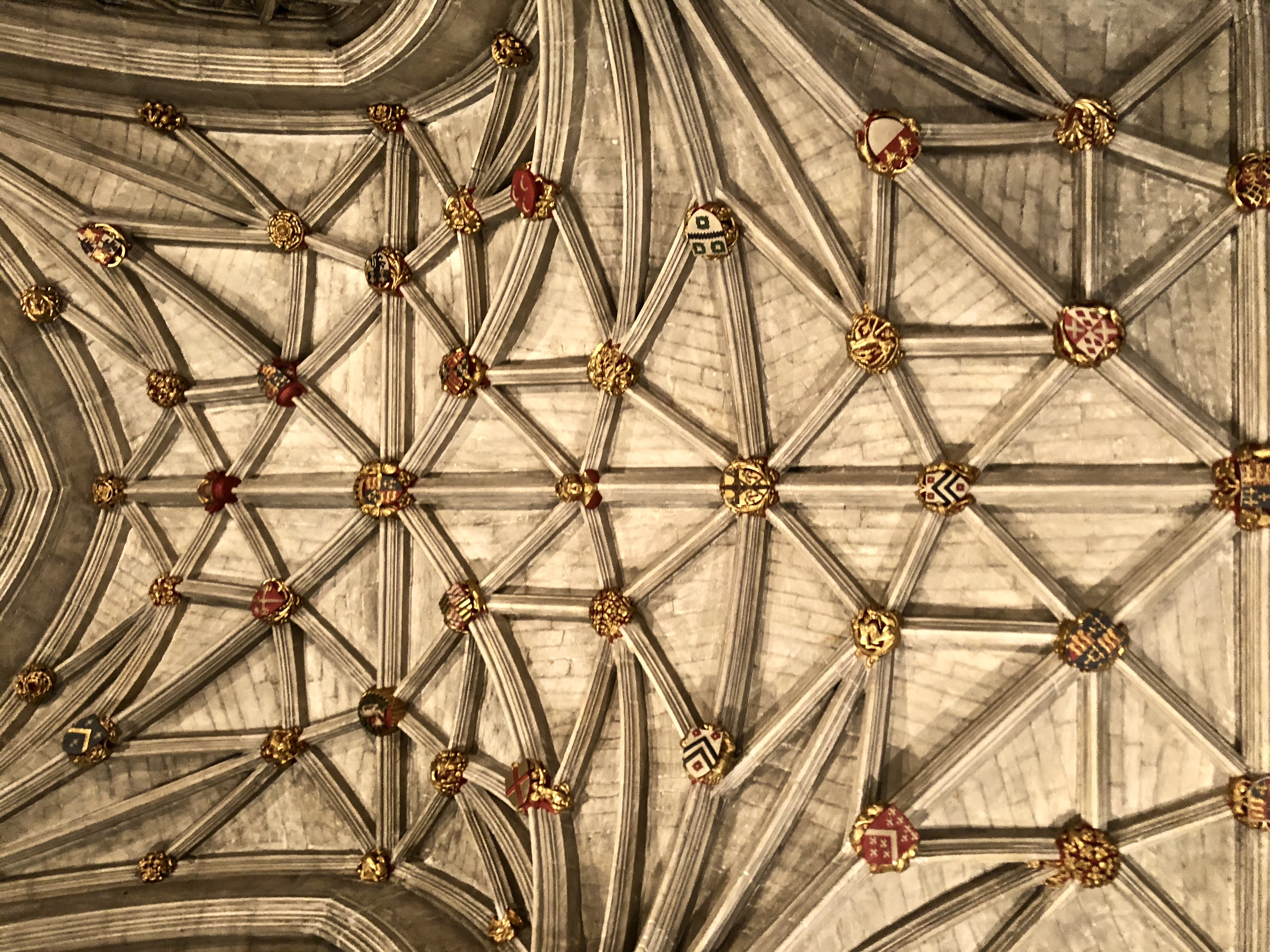
Lierne vault in Fromond's Chantry, 15th century

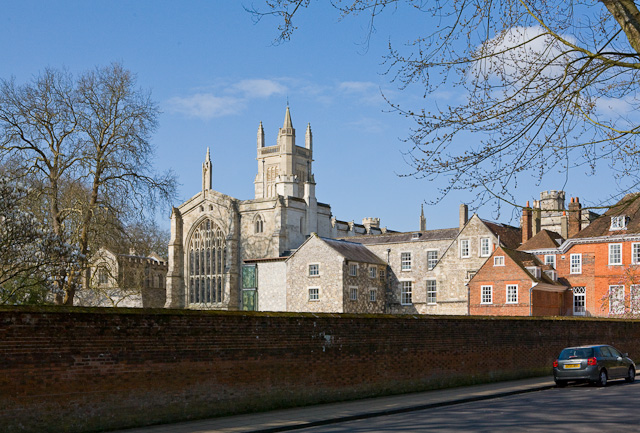
View from the Northeast (College Street): Fromond's Chantry (inside Cloisters) on left, then Chapel, outside of Chamber Court, and (in red brick) the Warden's Lodgings.

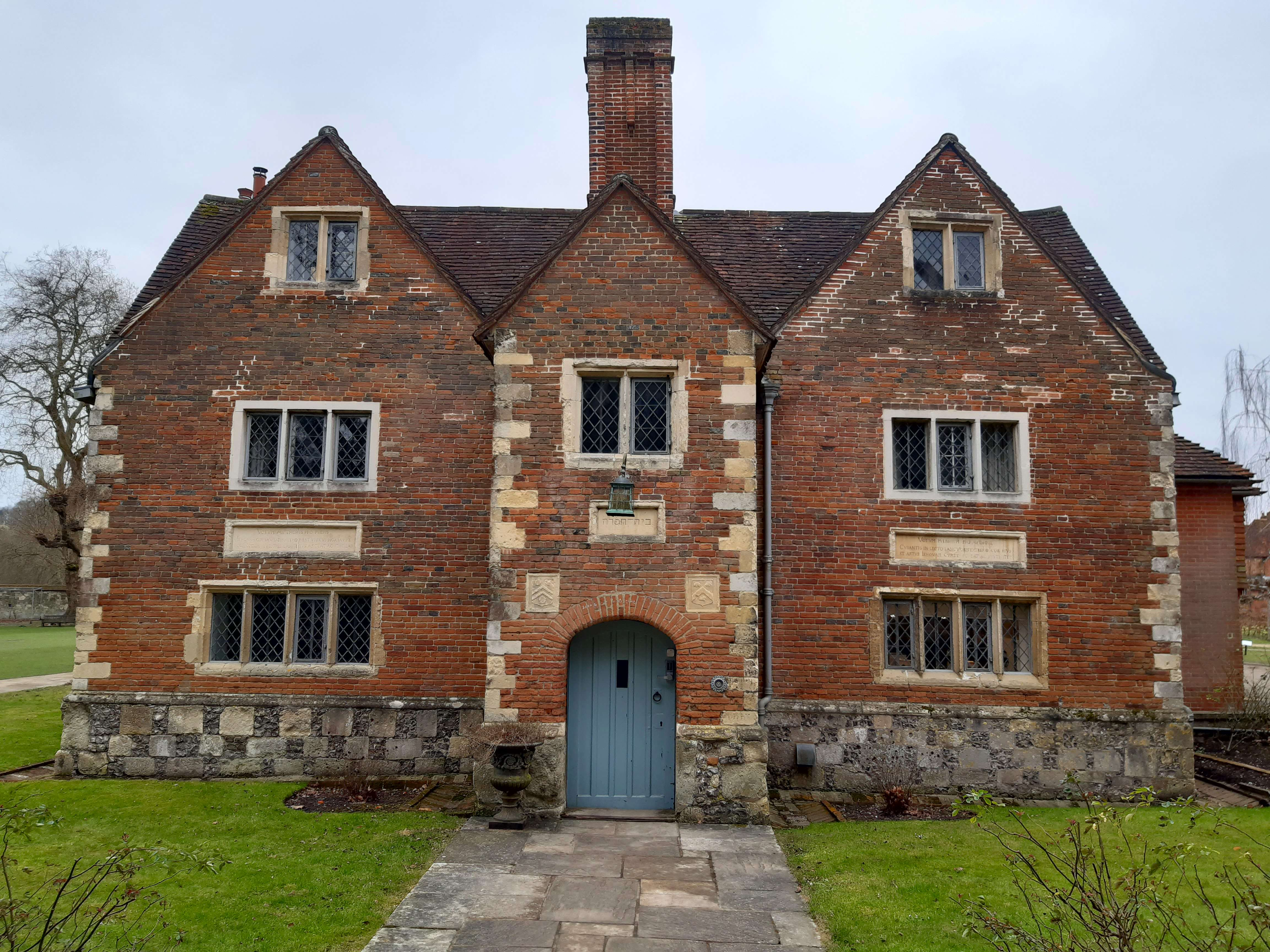
Bethesda, by John Harris,
1656–1657

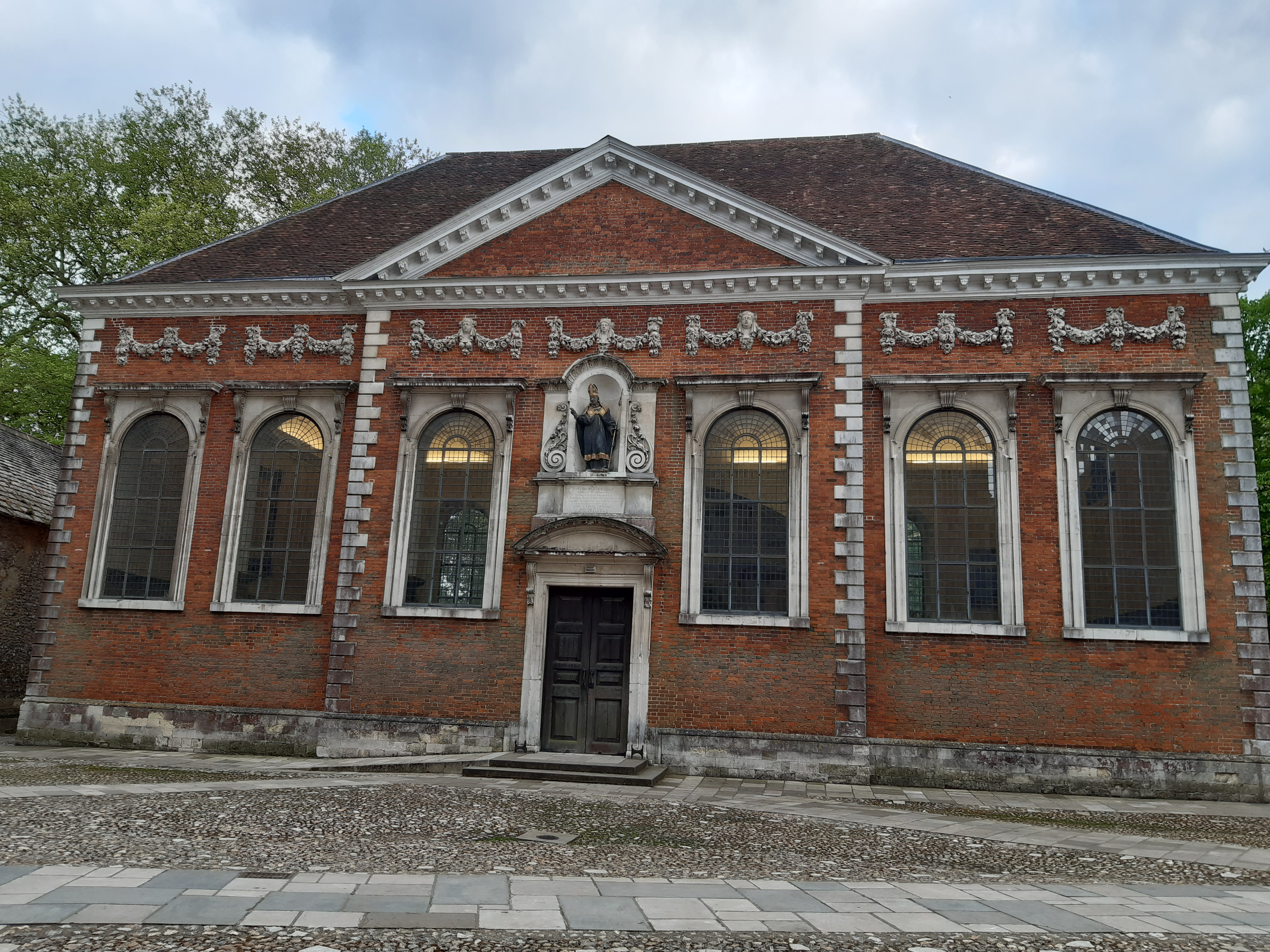
The building called "School" in Wren style, 1683–1687

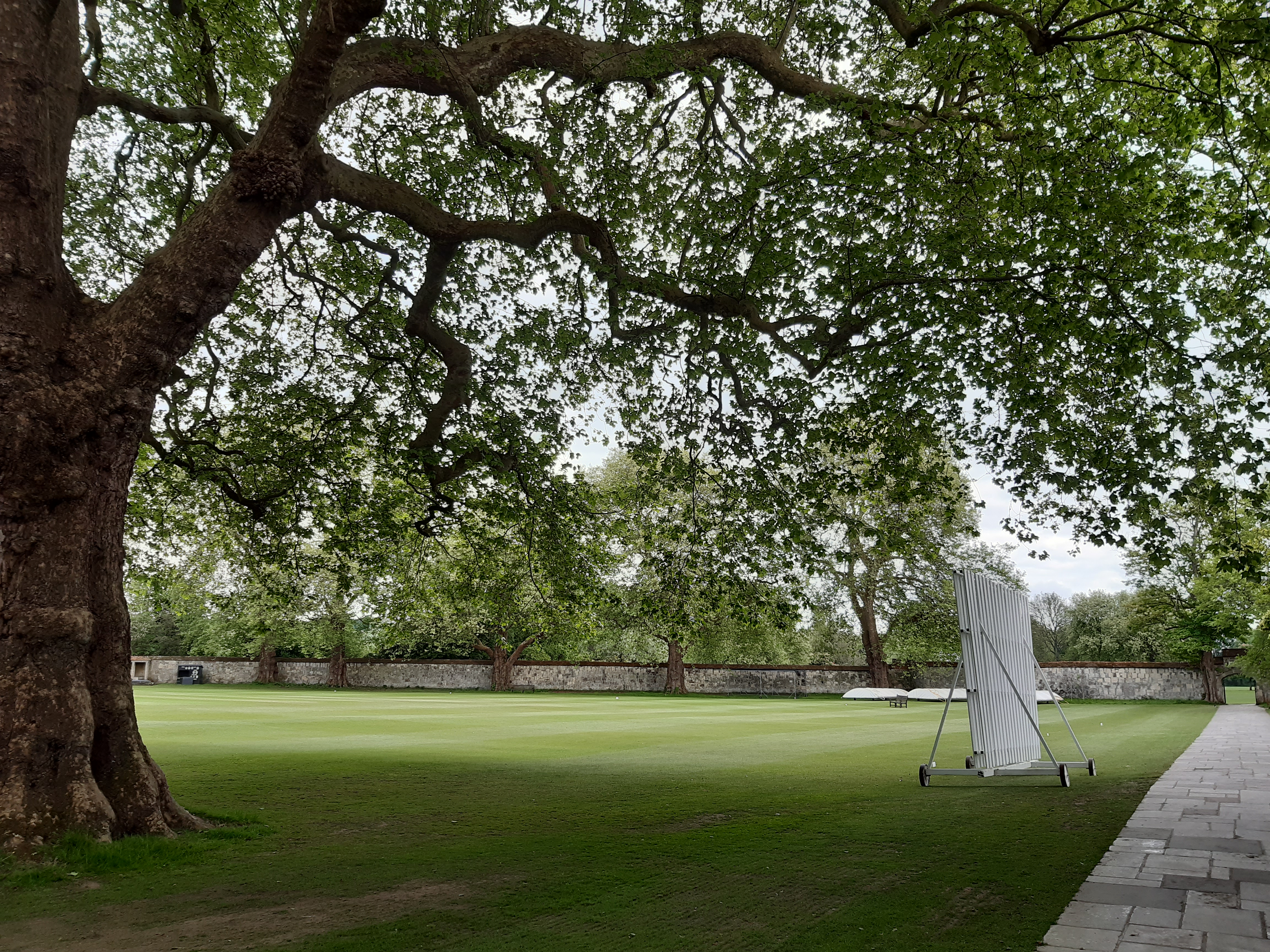
'Meads' walled cricket pitch
Warden John Nicholas's oak panelling for Chapel, 1680–1683 (removed 1874, in New Hall from 1961)

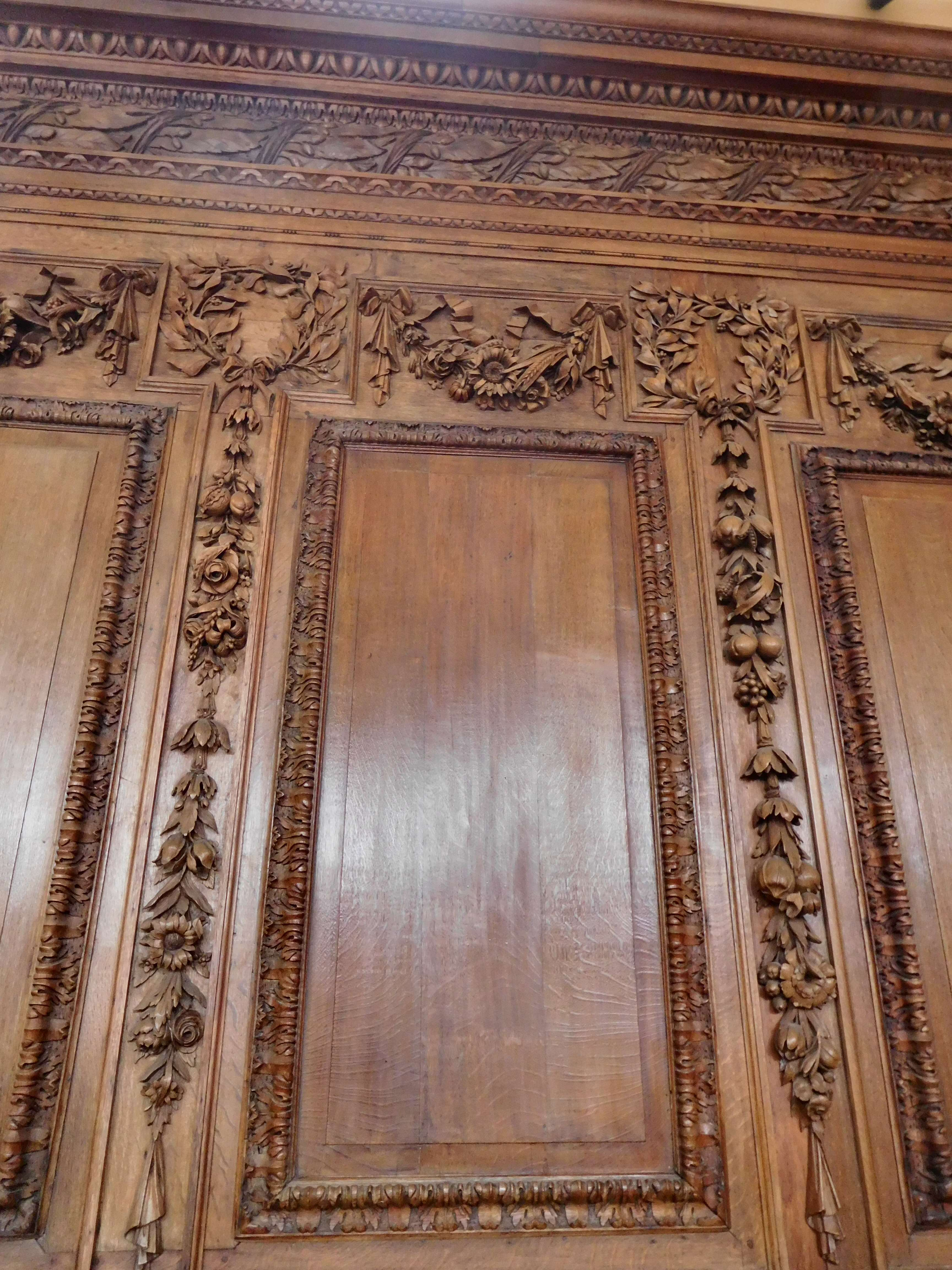
Panels with floral decoration

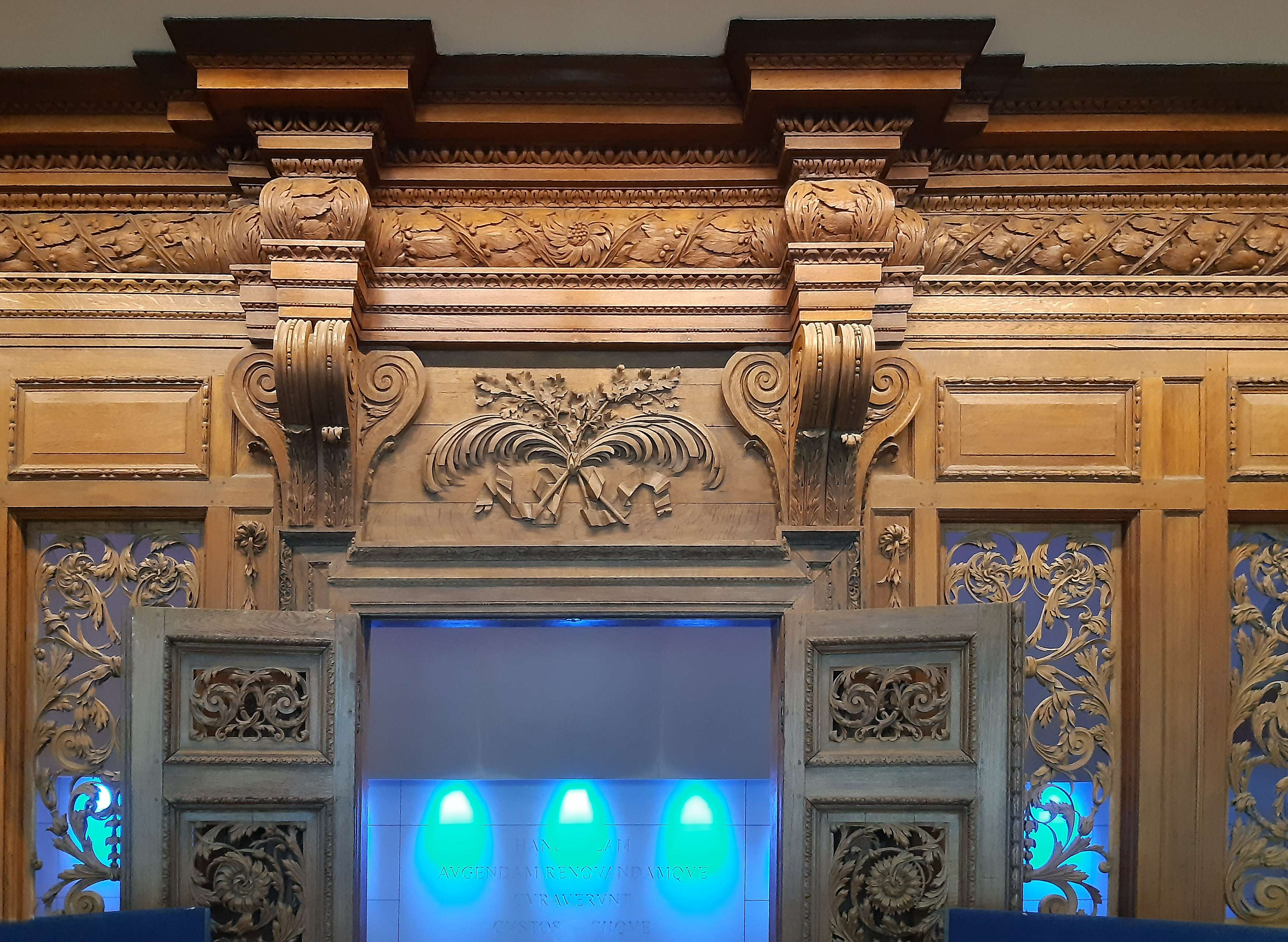
Doorway

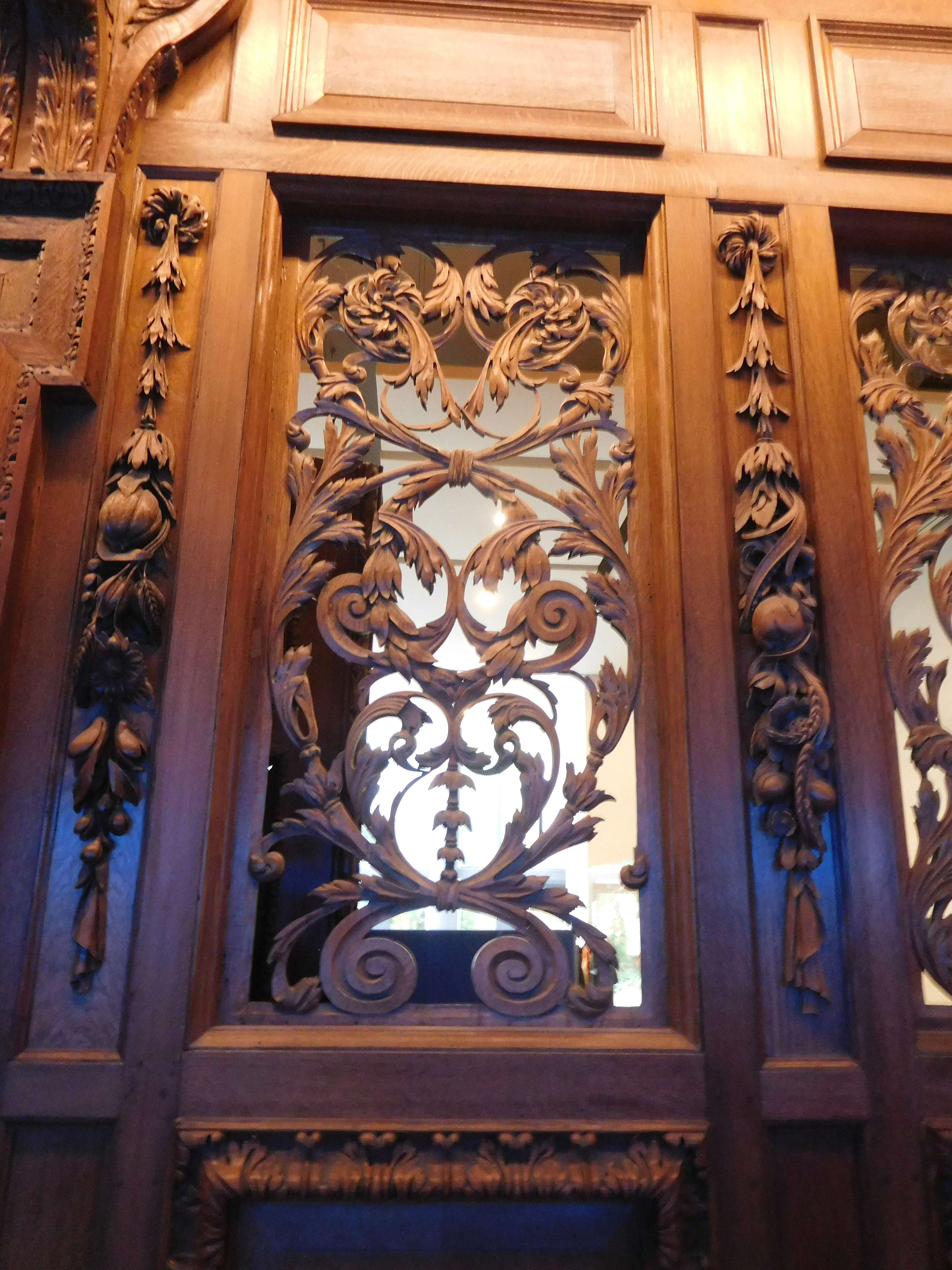
Window

== Victorian ==
The school was greatly extended in the 19th century during Queen Victoria's reign, with the addition of boarding houses for "commoners", paying pupils, as opposed to the scholars who continued to live in the medieval College. The first two were Chernocke House and Moberly's, which began as private houses owned by teachers. The third, Du Boulay's, was built speculatively by the Reverend James Du Boulay, borrowing money against the hope of future paying boarders. In 1869, six more boarding houses were added, four of them built speculatively under the headmaster George Ridding. The original and surviving sports field was the walled area of Meads, just behind School; other fields were added in the 19th century on both sides of the River Itchen.

The "forbidding" neo-Gothic Headmaster's House (no longer used for that purpose), its front in knapped and squared flint, the back in Georgian-style red brick, was built by the English architect G. S. Repton in 1839–1842. Just to the south of the Headmaster's House are Flint Court and Moberly Court, designed by the Gothic Revival architect William Butterfield, and built between 1867 and 1870. Flint Court, providing many of the school's classrooms and the teachers' common room, is open at the front; the wings to left and right are of 3 storeys, in red brick, described by Pevsner as "partly chequer, partly diaper"; the centre has a single-storey Perpendicular-style cloister in front of the full-height range.

In the 1880s, a large Sanatorium, designed by the English architect William White, was built in High Victorian Baronial style in 1884–1893; it has been described as "an all too prominent feature" of the school's landscape. It is now used as the college's art school.

For the school's 500th anniversary, the handsome but impractical Brunelleschi-style building called "Museum" (formally named "Memorial Buildings") by Basil Champneys, intended to support all the arts and sciences, was opened in 1897. Nikolaus Pevsner described it as "curiously Baroque", but "personal, bold, and successful [visually]". The building is in brick and Bath stone, arranged in nine bays with columns; the windows are flanked by prominent stone blocks projecting from and alternating with brickwork. The first and last bays are solid, with statues of William of Wykeham and of Queen Victoria. The building has a loggia with two rows of Tuscan-style columns, forming part of the ground floor.

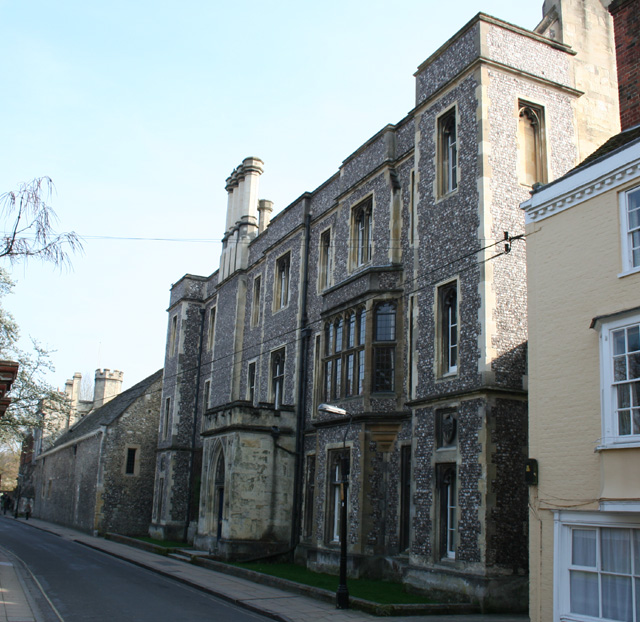
Headmaster's House by G. S. Repton, 1839–1842

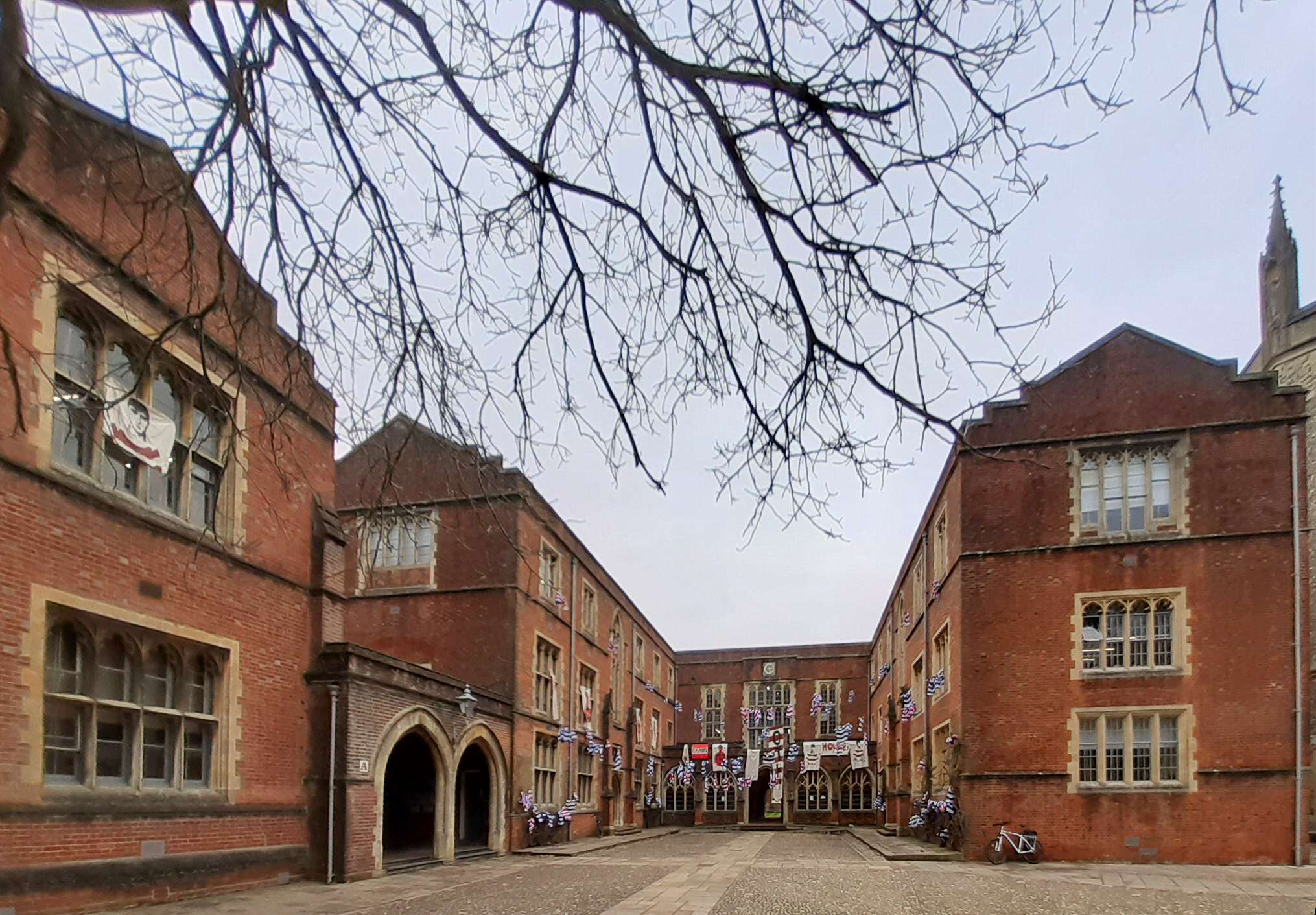
Flint Court by William Butterfield, 1867–1870

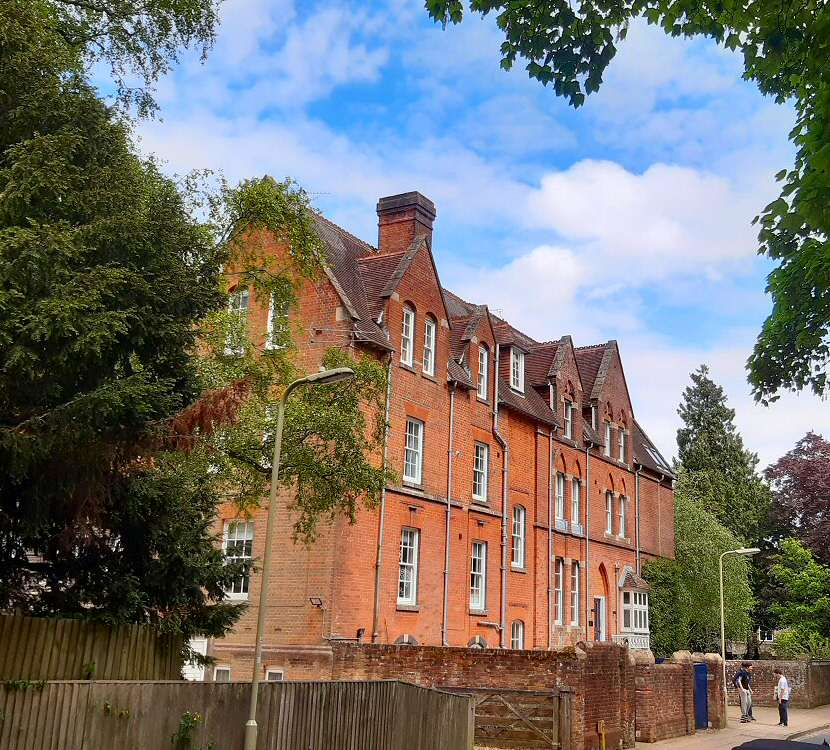
Sergeant's House by G. E. Street, one of the 1869 boarding houses

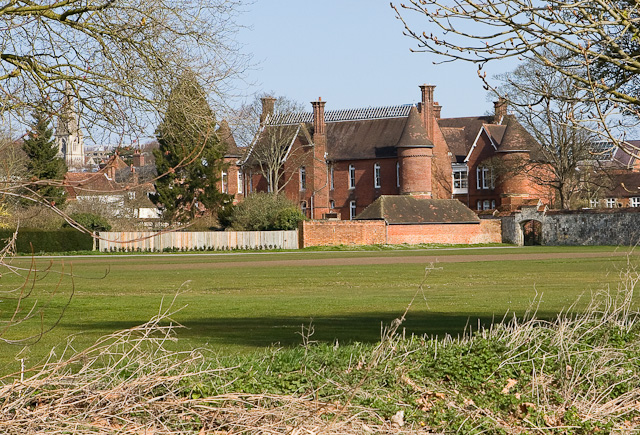
The old Sanatorium building in High Victorian Baronial by William White, 1884–1893

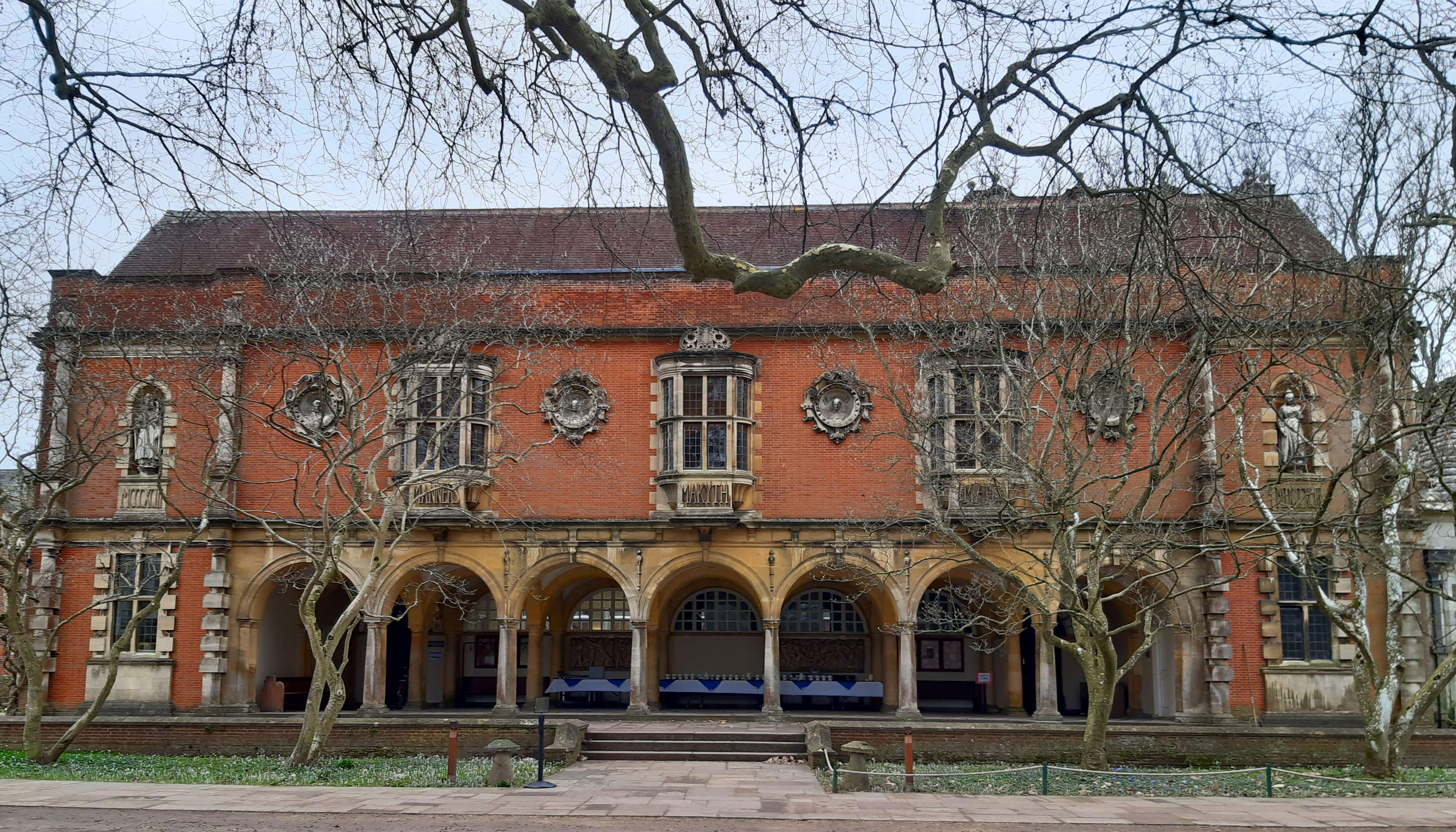
Museum, formerly Memorial Buildings, Basil Champneys, 1897

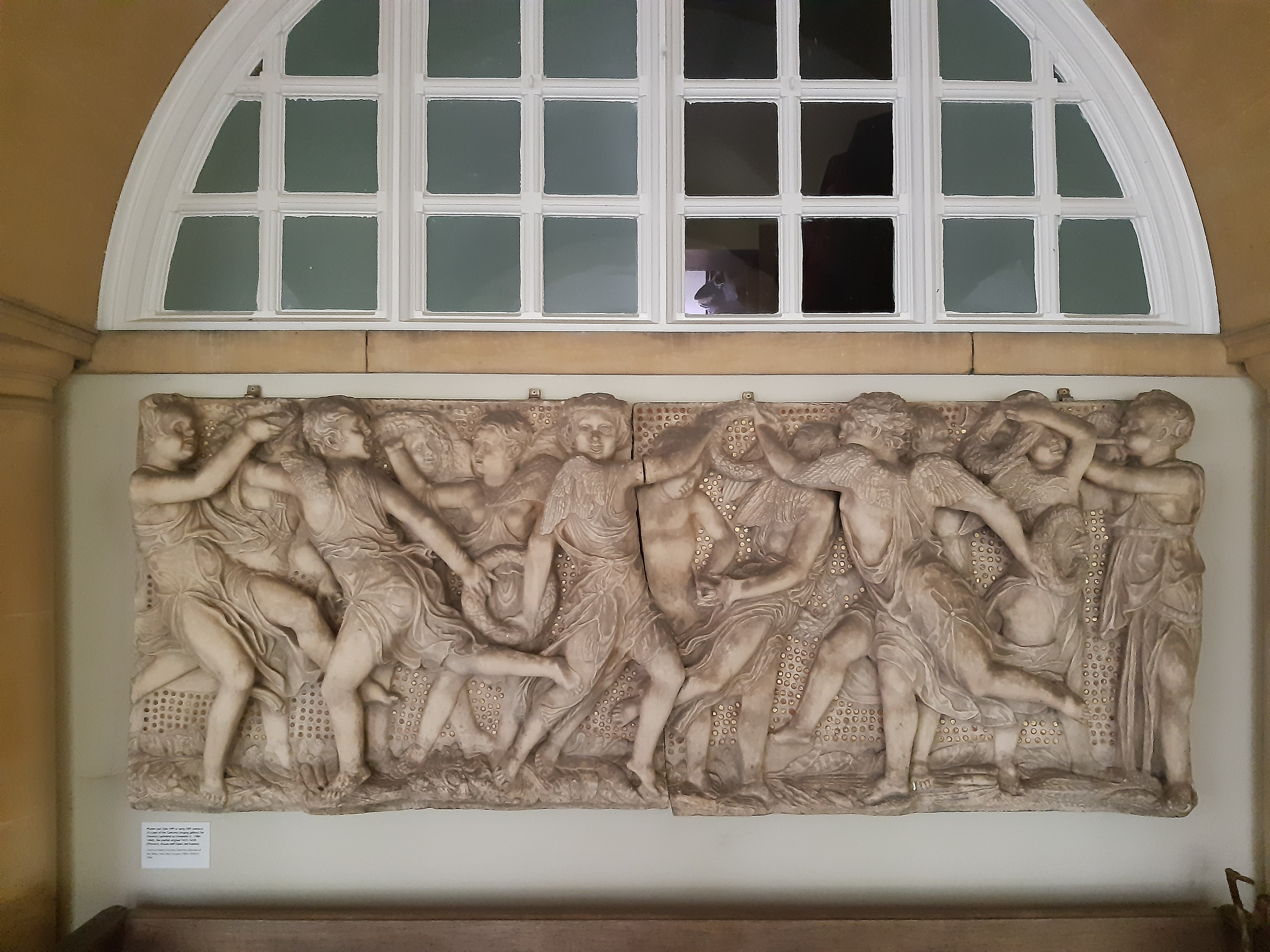
Inside the loggia of the Museum, with a cast of Donatello's Cantoria for Florence Cathedral

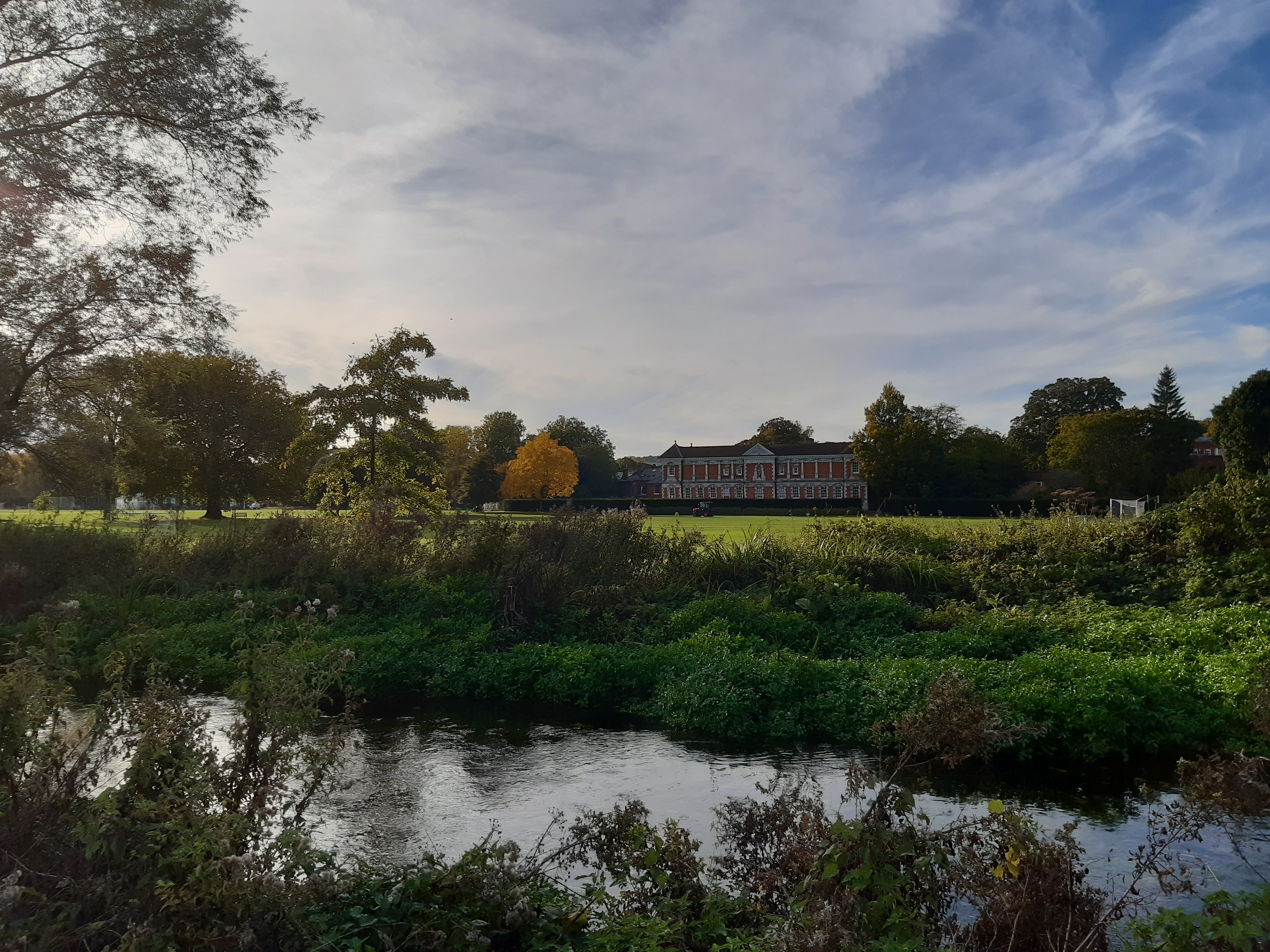
River Itchen, playing fields (Science School in the background)

== Modern ==
The Music School, designed by the arts and crafts architect E. S. Prior, was added in 1903–1904. The octagonal building is in flint and greenstone, with large round-topped gables fronting a pyramidal roof, and a large round hood over the doorway. Pevsner comments that it is a "composition of strange elements indeed." It was extended in the 21st century with a mixture of yellow brick, limestone dressings, glass, and zinc cladding.

The Science School was designed by the English architect Henry L. G. Hill, who served as the college archivist. It is in what the college calls Queen Anne revival style, and was completed in 1904; it remains in use for its original purpose. The building is of thirteen bays in red brick, dressed with white Portland stone. Historic England calls the style "richly decorated ... [Edwardian] Wrenaissance". Pevsner describes the building as "badly organized and detailed." The hipped roofs are covered with slate, above a cornice with modillion eaves. An extension was designed by the architect T. D. Atkinson around 1930. The separate Biology Block behind the Science School was added by the architect and college bursar Ruthven O. Hall in 1958; Pevsner calls it "dull and utilitarian".

To the west of Meads, the college's War Cloister serves as a memorial to the Wykehamist dead of the two World Wars. It was designed by Herbert Baker, architect of many colonial buildings in South Africa and New Delhi, and dedicated in 1924. It is a listed building. A bronze bust of Old Boy Air Chief Marshal Lord Dowding sits on the west side of the cloister. The College's South Africa Gate on Kingsgate Street commemorates the Wykehamist dead of the 1899–1902 Boer War. It leads to the War Cloister. Another older war memorial in the school is the entry chamber to Chapel. Known as "Crimea" after the Crimean War of 1853–1856, it bears the names of Wykehamists who died at the siege of Sebastopol.

A hall big enough for the enlarged school, New Hall, was opened in 1961, just east of the Mill Leat, a branch of the River Itchen. Its design was constrained by the need to accommodate the oak panelling which had been taken out of Chapel in that building's "disastrous" internal redesign of 1874. The interior of New Hall with Warden Nicholas's 1680–1683 panelling has been called "a triumph". Pevsner comments that the architect, Peter Shepheard, "lost his nerve" and chose to be "above all tactful" rather than making the hall modern; he calls the resulting exterior in "blue" brick with stone facings "not self-effacing ... [but] very noticeable, only in a pleadingly inoffensive way."

The development of a "Southern Campus" comprising a PE centre, swimming pool, rifle range, and squash courts by the architects Design Engine began in 2017 on the site between the Kingsgate Park sports field and the Norman Road tennis courts. The "complex geometry of the roof forms" is intended to reference the silhouette of the college's historic buildings, while the sports centre's grey brick and the other buildings' red brick is meant to reflect the tones of the medieval flint and brick. The "substantial" buildings are designed to be "largely hidden" from outside the college.

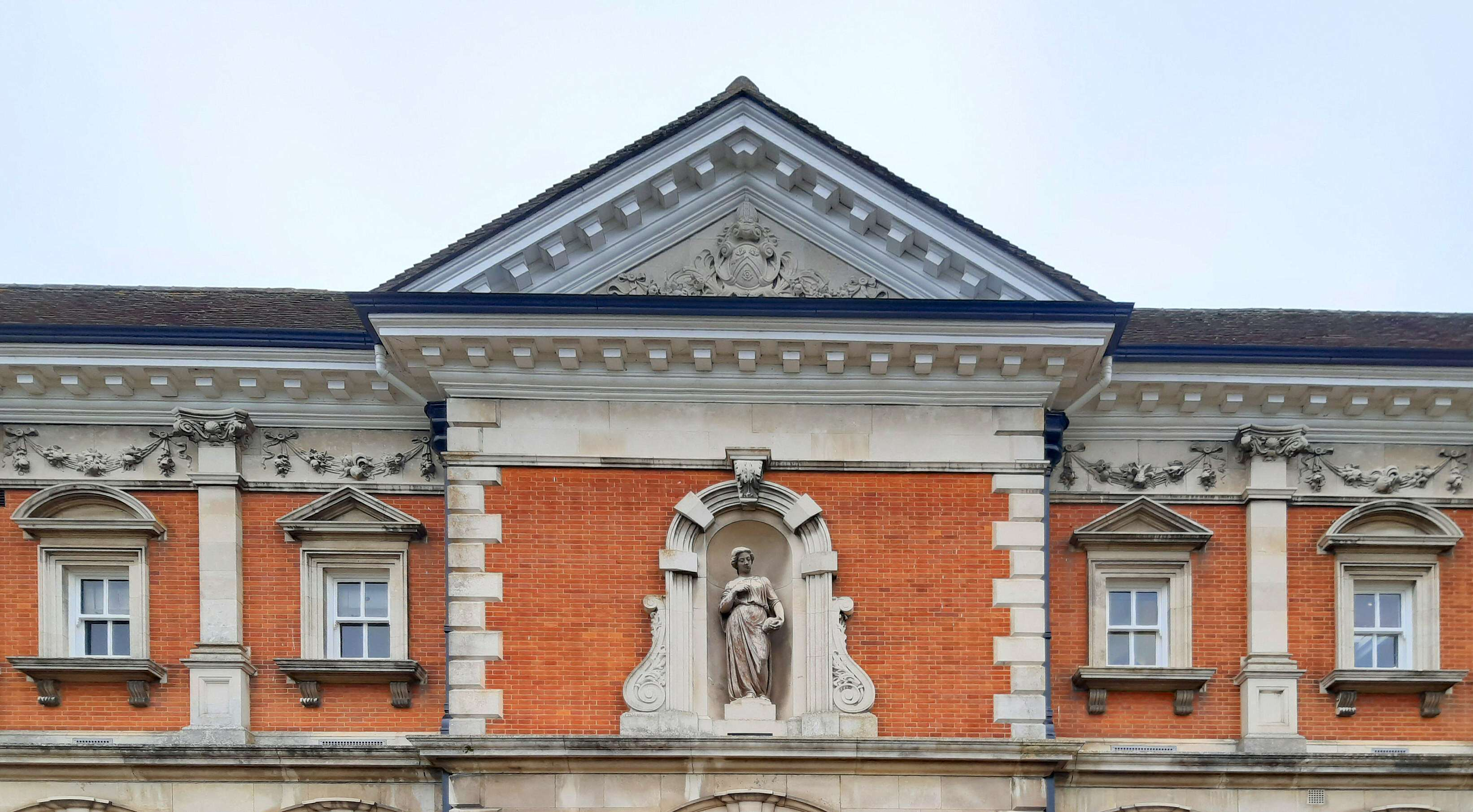
Science School (detail) by Henry L. G. Hill, 1904

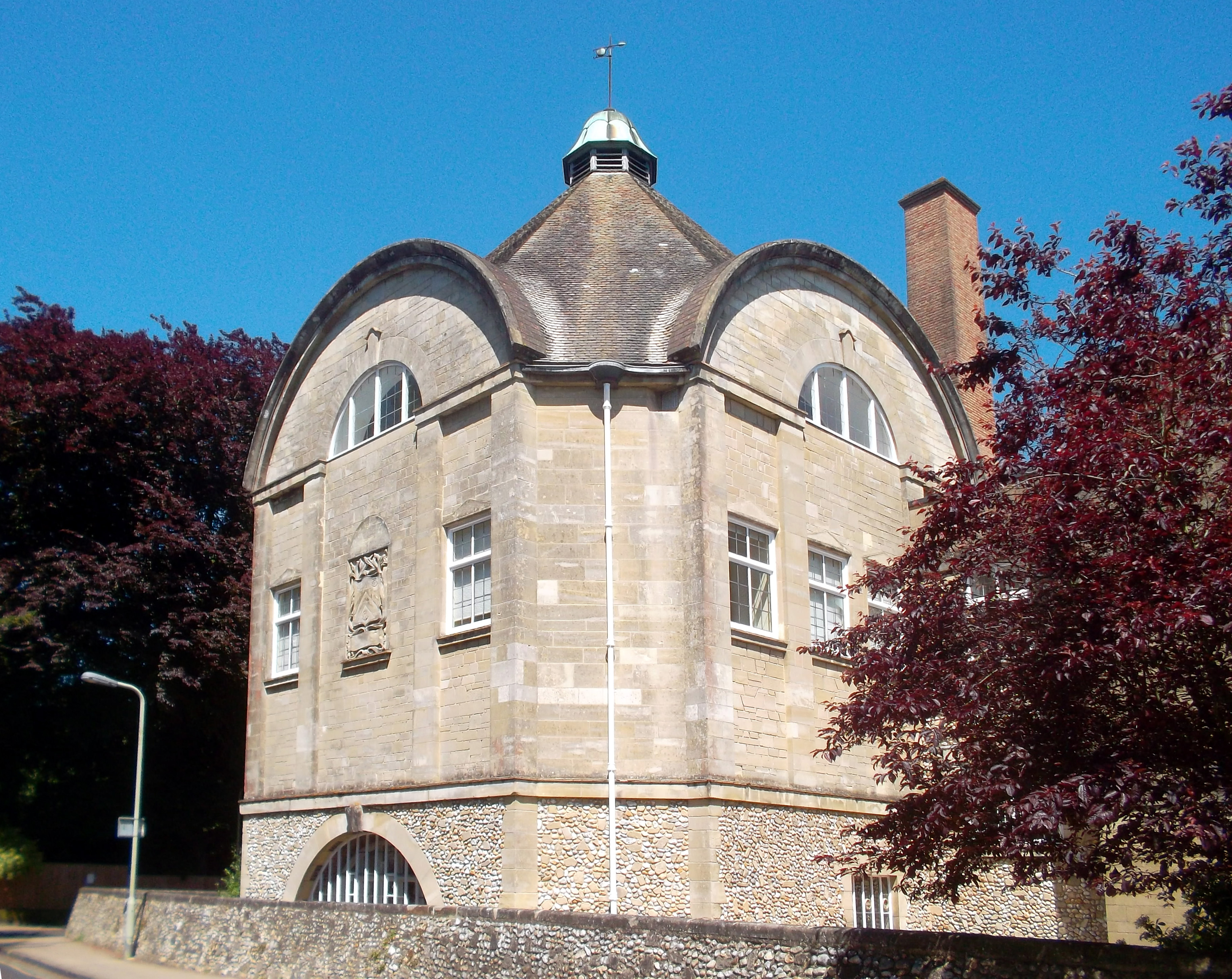
Music School by E. S. Prior, 1903–1904

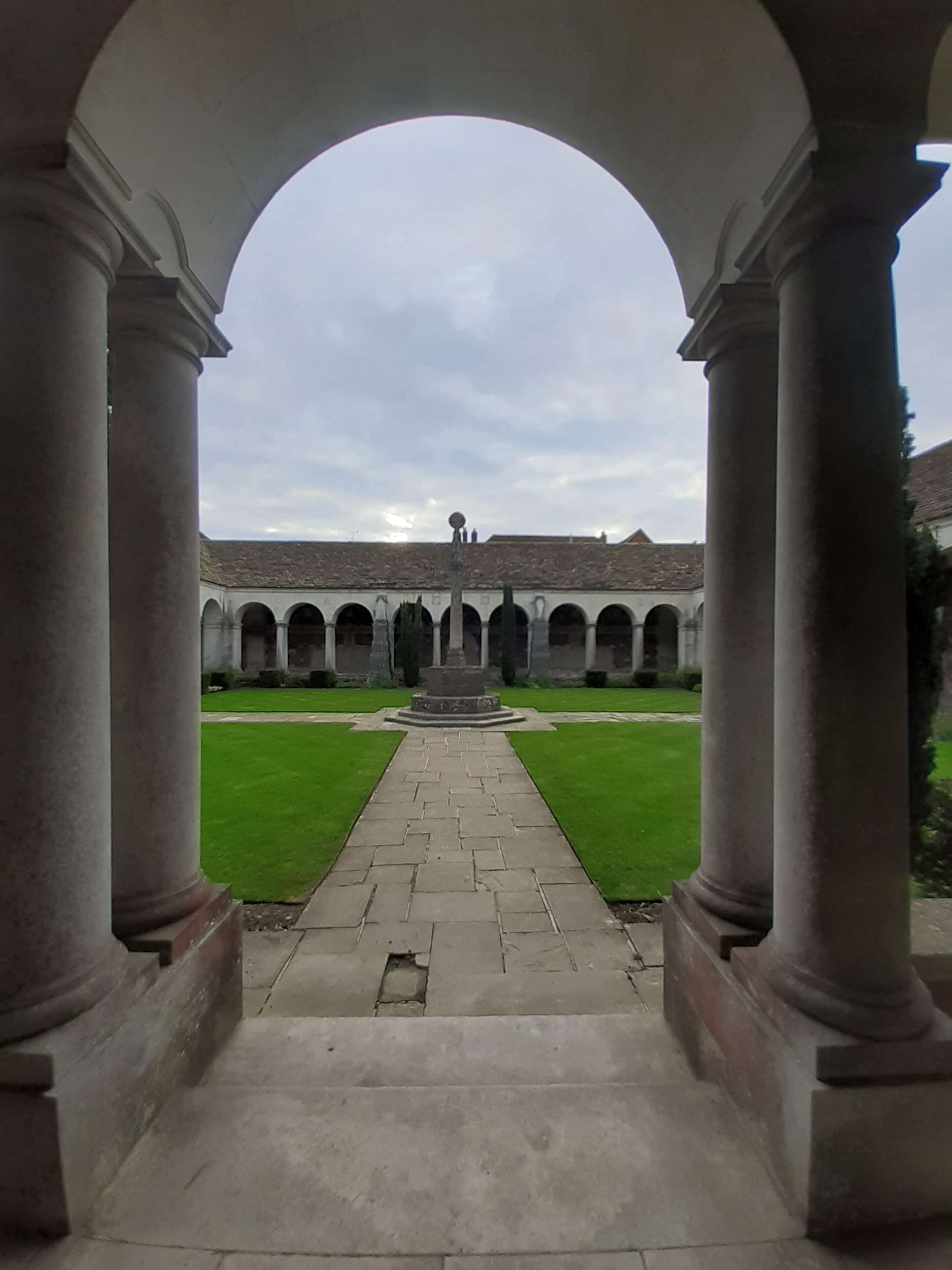
War Cloister by Herbert Baker, 1924

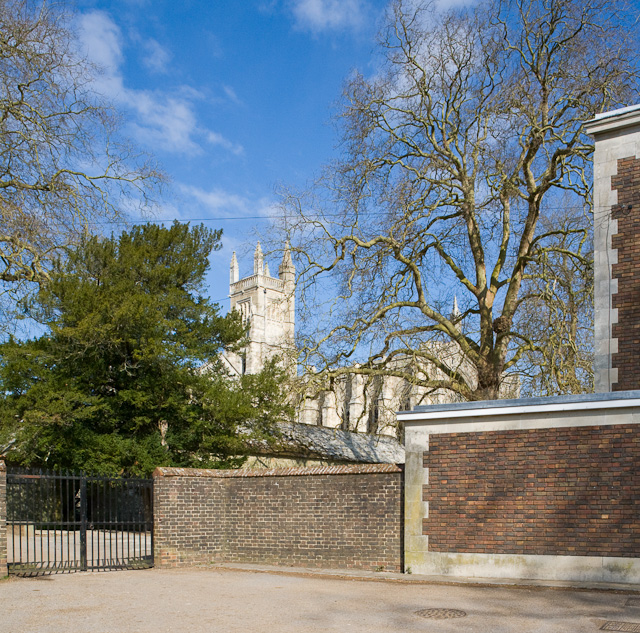
View from Peter Shepheard's New Hall (brick with stone facings) 1961, to Chapel

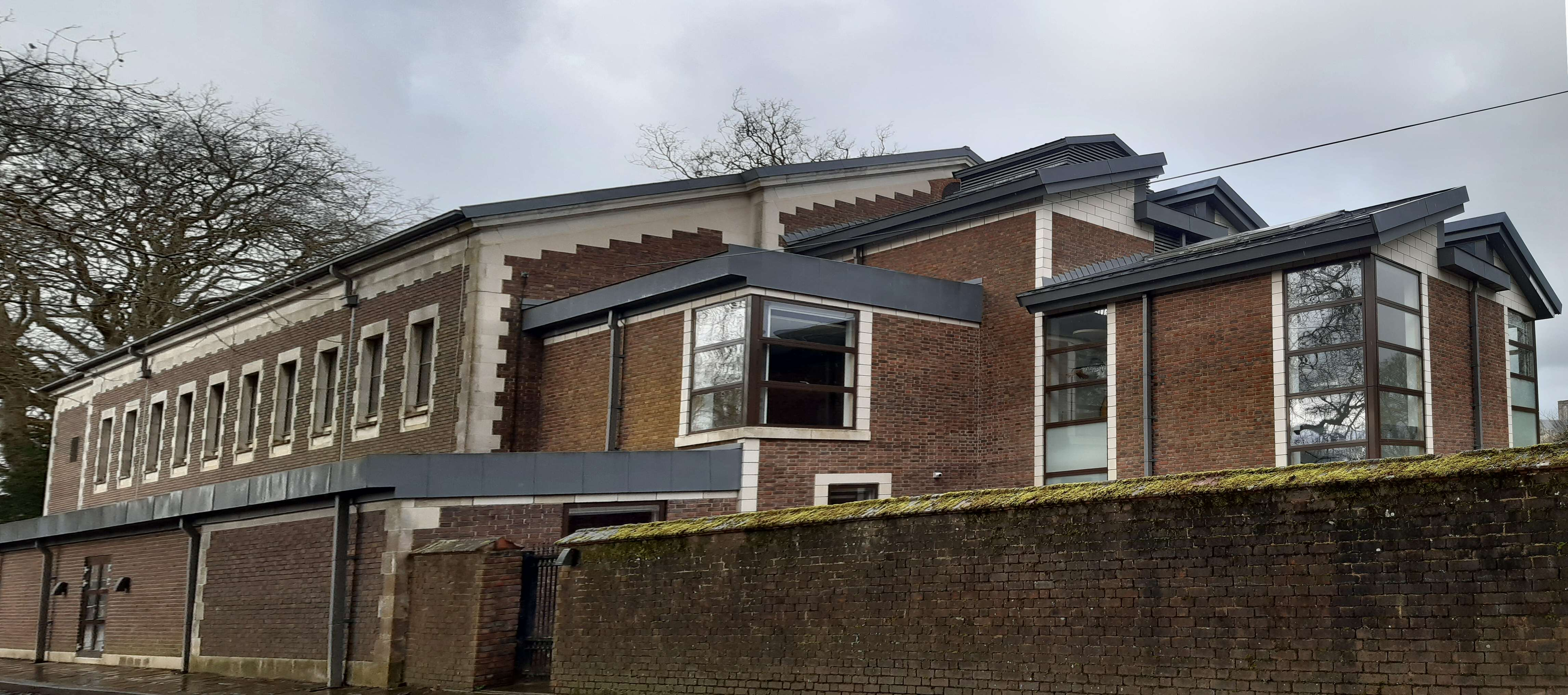
New Hall 1961 (left) with music rooms extension, 2014

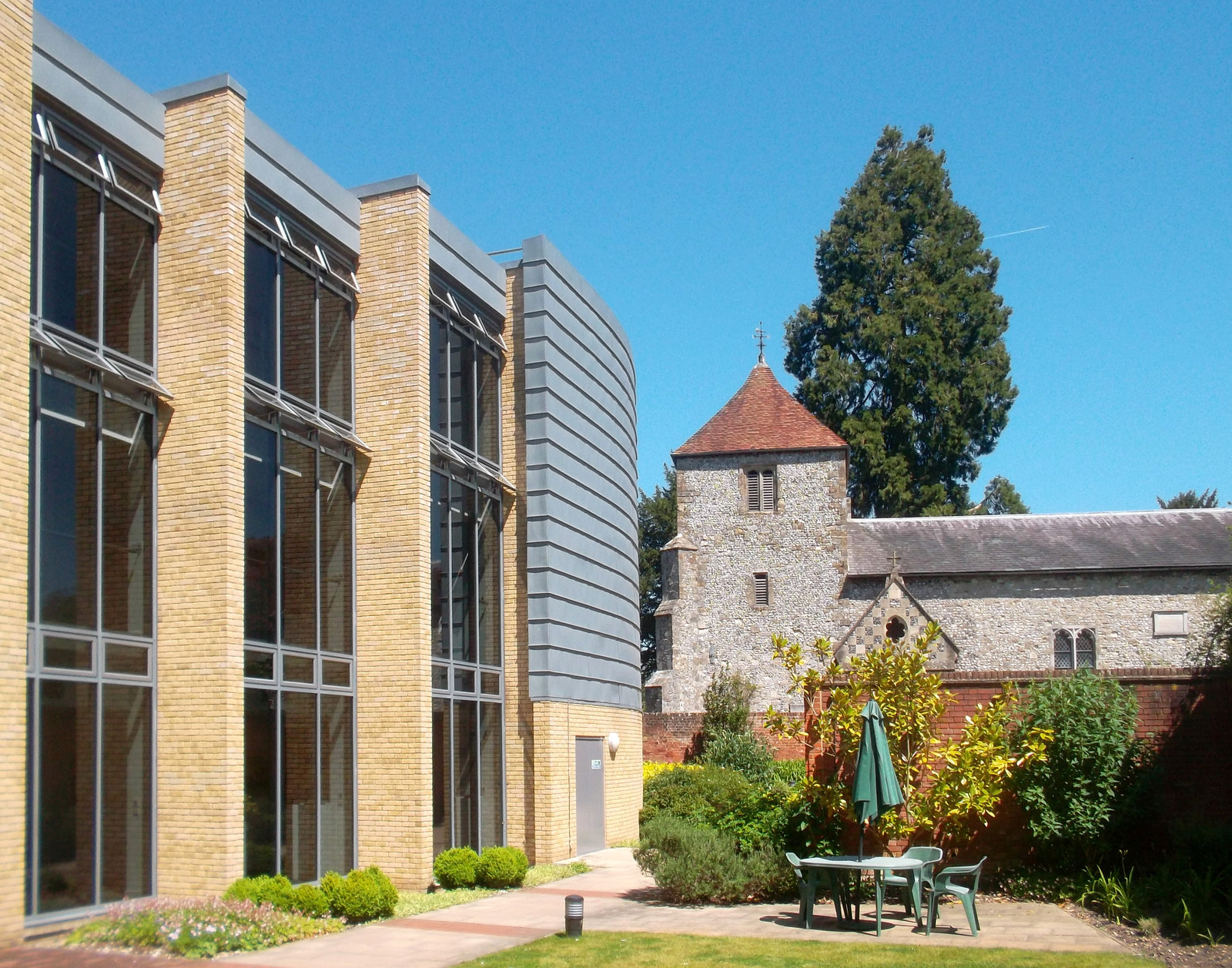
Music School's 21st century extension, with St Michael's Church

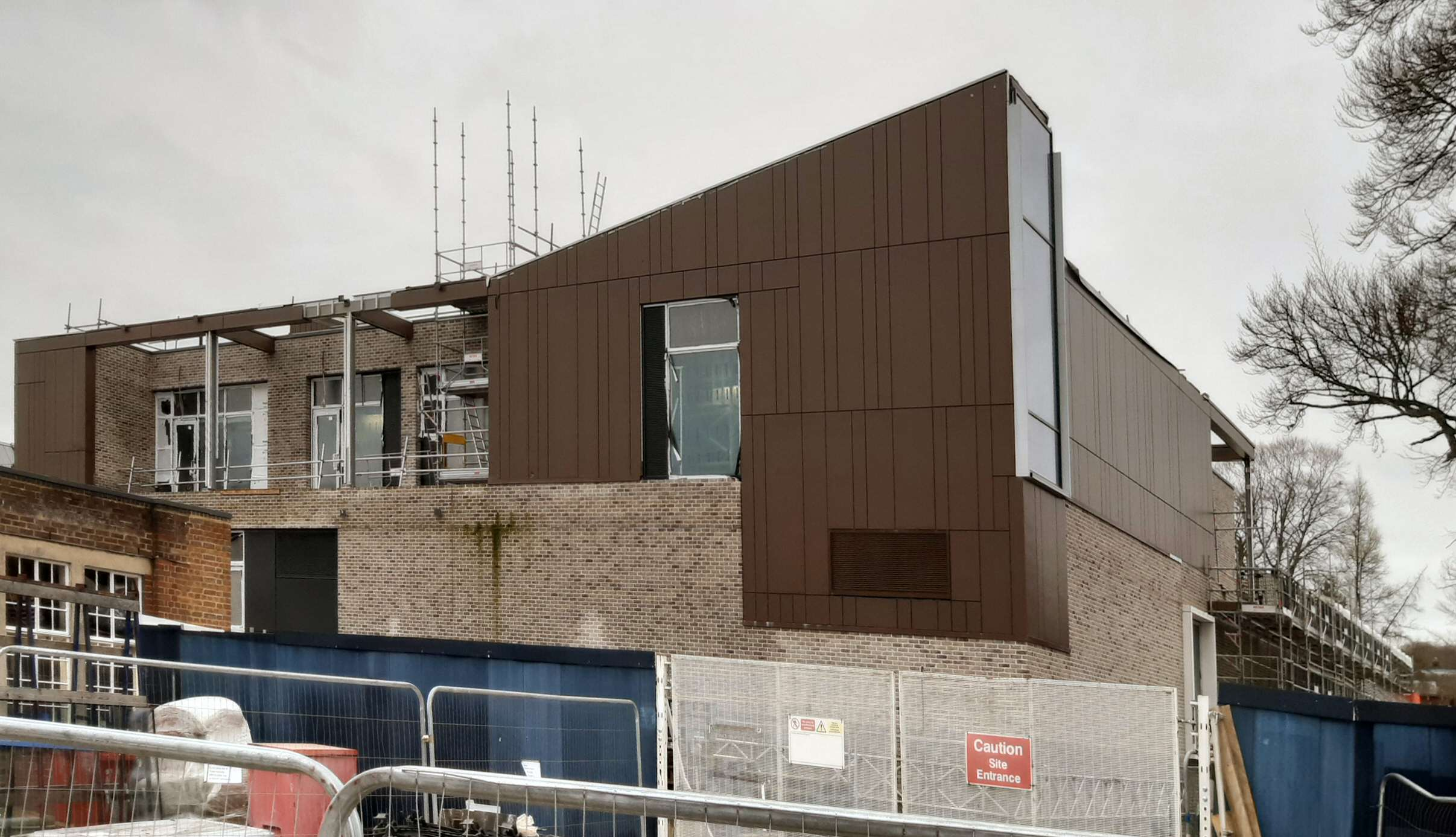
Southern Campus Sports Centre, nearing completion, 2023

== Sources ==
- Pevsner, Nikolaus; Lloyd, David (1967). Hampshire and the Isle of Wight. Yale University Press. pp. 698–706. OCLC 850028671.
- Sabben-Clare, James (1981). Winchester College. Paul Cave Publications. ISBN 978-0-86146-023-6.
