= Henry Stringer =

Henry Stringer (c. 1594 – February 1657) was an English clergyman and academic.

Stringer was educated at Winchester College, where he gained a scholarship aged 11 in 1605, and New College, Oxford, gaining a fellowship in 1614, and graduating B.A. 1618, M.A. 1621 (incorporated M.A. at Cambridge in 1627), B.D. 1632, D.D. 1642.

He was appointed Regius Professor of Greek in 1625 and Proctor in 1630, and Warden of New College, Oxford in 1647, expressly against the orders of Parliament. He was ejected by the Parliamentary visitors in 1648.

Stringer was buried in Blackfriars church, London in February 1657.

Academic offices
Preceded by Robert Pink	Warden of New College, Oxford; 1647–1648	Succeeded by George Marshall
