= Michael Woodward (academic) =

Michael Woodward DD (November 1602, in Bedfordshire – 6 June 1675, in Oxford) was an English educational administrator in the third quarter of the 17th Century.

Woodward graduated BA from New College, Oxford in 1625; MA in 1629; and BD in 1637. He was warden of his college from 1658 until his death.

Academic offices
Preceded by George Marshall	Warden of New College, Oxford; 1658–1675	Succeeded by John Nicholas
