= John Nicholas (academic) =

English academic administrator

John Nicholas D.D. was an English academic administrator at the University of Oxford.

Nicholas was elected Warden (head) of New College, Oxford, in 1675, a post he held until 1679. During his time as Warden of New College, he was also Vice-Chancellor of Oxford University from 1677 until 1679.

He was elected warden of Winchester College in 1679, a post he held until his death. He extended and adapted buildings around Winchester College. He had its Chapel decorated with fine oak panelling in 1680–1683. Soon afterwards, in 1683–1687, he had the building called "School" constructed in the English baroque Wren style.

Academic offices
Preceded by Michael Woodward	Warden of New College, Oxford; 1675–1679	Succeeded by Henry Beeston
Preceded by Henry Clerk	Vice-Chancellor of Oxford University; 1677–1679	Succeeded by Timothy Halton
