= George Marshall (warden) =

George Marshall was an English educational administrator in the middle 17th Century.

Marshall graduated BA from St John's College, Cambridge in 1626; and MA in 1629. He was incorporated at Oxford in 1649 and graduated BD that year. He was warden of New College, Oxford, from 1649 until his death on 3 November 1658.

Academic offices
Preceded by Henry Stringer	Warden of New College, Oxford; 1649–1658	Succeeded by Michael Woodward
