= George Stanley Repton =

English architect

George Stanley Repton (30 January 1786 – 29 June 1858) was an English architect.

George Stanley, the fourth son of Humphry Repton, was a pupil of the Anglo-French architect Augustus Charles Pugin, and entered the office of John Nash, becoming one of his chief assistants. In conjunction with Nash, he altered and enlarged the opera house in Haymarket, London, and designed the church of St Philip, Regent Street. He assisted his father and brother in the plans for the Royal Pavilion at Brighton, and designed the library at Lord Darnley's seat of Cobham in Kent. In the county of Devon in the southwest of England, he designed several country houses.

Lady Elizabeth Scott, the eldest daughter of Lord Eldon, having made some unsuccessful attempts to obtain her father's consent to her marriage with Repton, escaped from the house on the morning of 27 November 1817, and she and Repton were married the same day by license at St George's, Hanover Square. Ferrey says that they had been "privately married in March 1817" (Recollections of Pugin, pp. 4–5). The lady's father was exceedingly angry, but in 1820 a reconciliation took place, and under Lord Eldon's will her children shared in the family property equally with the issue of his other daughter.

Repton did not long continue to follow his profession. He died on 29 June 1858. His widow died at Norfolk Street, Park Lane, London, on 16 April 1862, aged 78. Their only son, George William John Repton, sat in parliament for many years, first as member for St Albans, and then for Warwick.

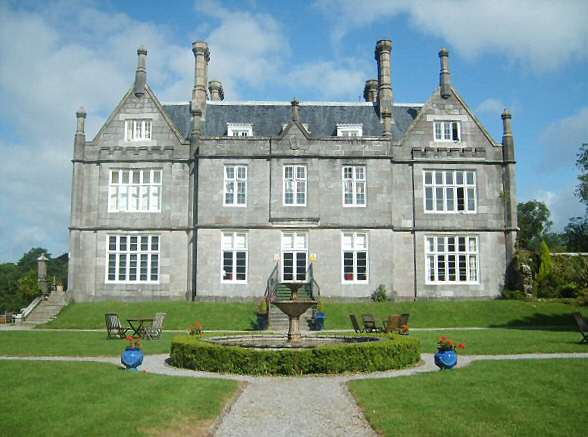
Kitley House, one of several country houses that Repton designed in Devon
