= Pedersen Way =

Shared-use path in Gloucestershire, UK

- Pedersen Way logo
- Location: Gloucestershire, United Kingdom
- Established: 2026
- Use: Walking, running, cycling and horseriding
- Difficulty: Easy
- Season: All year
- Surface: Asphalt
- Website: pedersenway.org.uk

The Pedersen Way is a shared-use path between Uley and Cam and Dursley railway station in Gloucestershire, United Kingdom. It was officially opened by Chris Boardman on 24 April 2026 although much of the route is still in the planning and construction phase.

== History ==
The route was proposed by local resident Bob Littleford in 2007 and known as the Cam, Dursley & Uley Greenway. It was intended to follow the off-road route of the Dursley and Midland Junction Railway which had operated between Dursley and the Midland Railway line at Coaley Junction between 1856 and 1970. However, encroachment on the route by development after the line had closed meant that alternatives routes around the blocked sections had to be developed. In February 2026 the project received funding of £110 000 from Gloucestershire County Council to pay for a crossing to help connect sections of the route.

Proposed links to Slimbridge and Coaley were added as the project developed and in April 2026 the route was renamed the Pedersen Way in honour of the Danish inventor Mikael Pedersen. He lived in Dursley from 1893 until around 1918 and is best remembered for the Pedersen bicycle which was manufactured locally and also called the Dursley Pedersen Bicycle.

== Route ==
Route of the northern section of the Pedersen Way

As of 2026 there are currently two open sections of the route.

- The northern section runs from a point east of Blackberry Grove, Cam to the former railway bridge over the River Cam east of Draycott Business Park. This section consists of an off-road asphalt path throughout. There is also a short spur linking this section of the route to Box Road.
- The southern section runs through the Littlecombe development in Dursley and is mostly on-road. The opening of the first section in April 2026 was marked by a cycle ride from Ashton Lane in Littlecombe to Vale Hospital, led by Chris Boardman and Simon Opher.

A third section of the route is currently being built by Linden Homes as part of the Draycott Fields development. This will extend the northern section of the route a further 400m to the south and provide a link to the A4135 in Draycott.

== Gallery ==
Map of the southern section

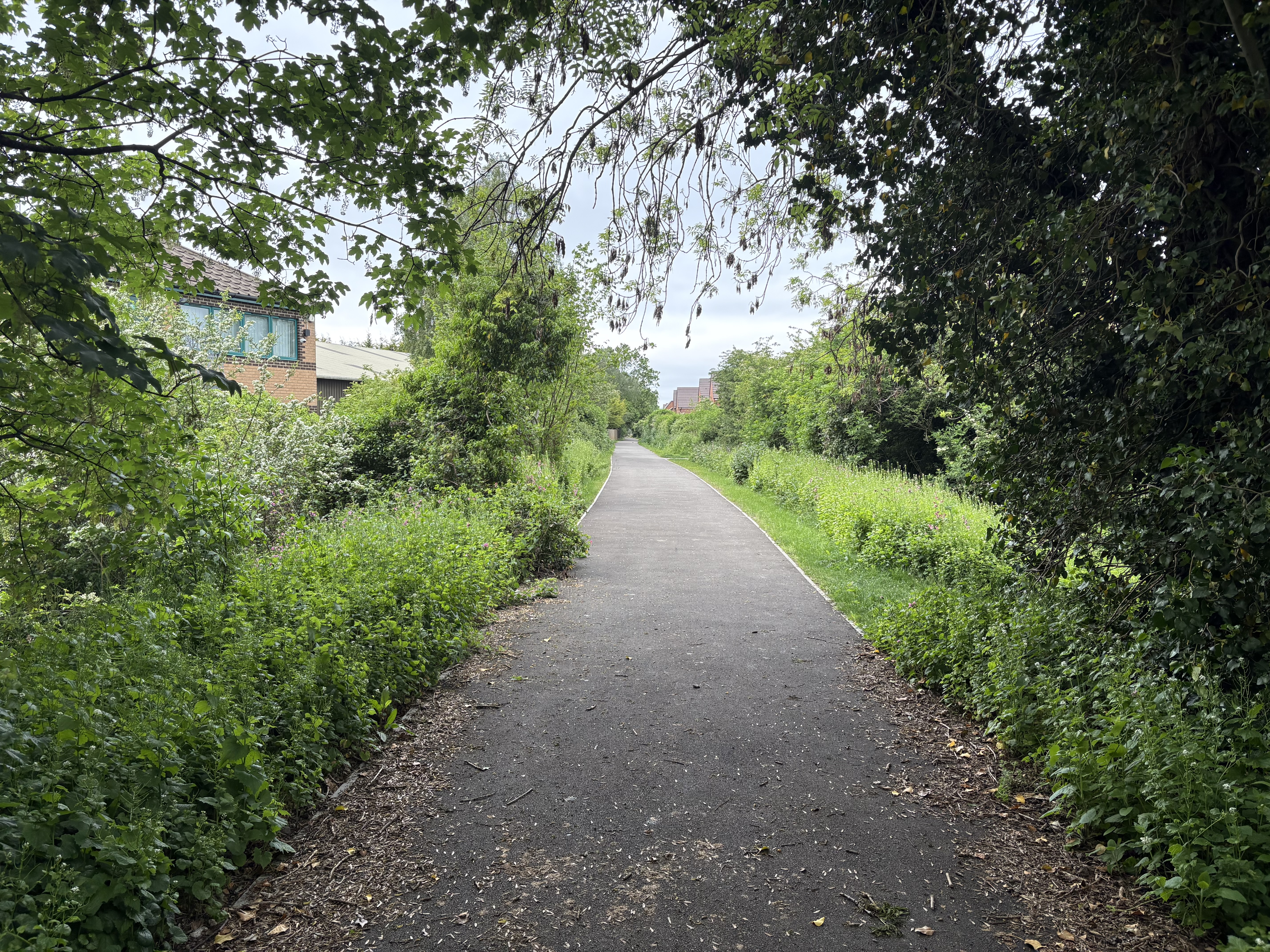
Northern section of Pedersen Way towards Box Road

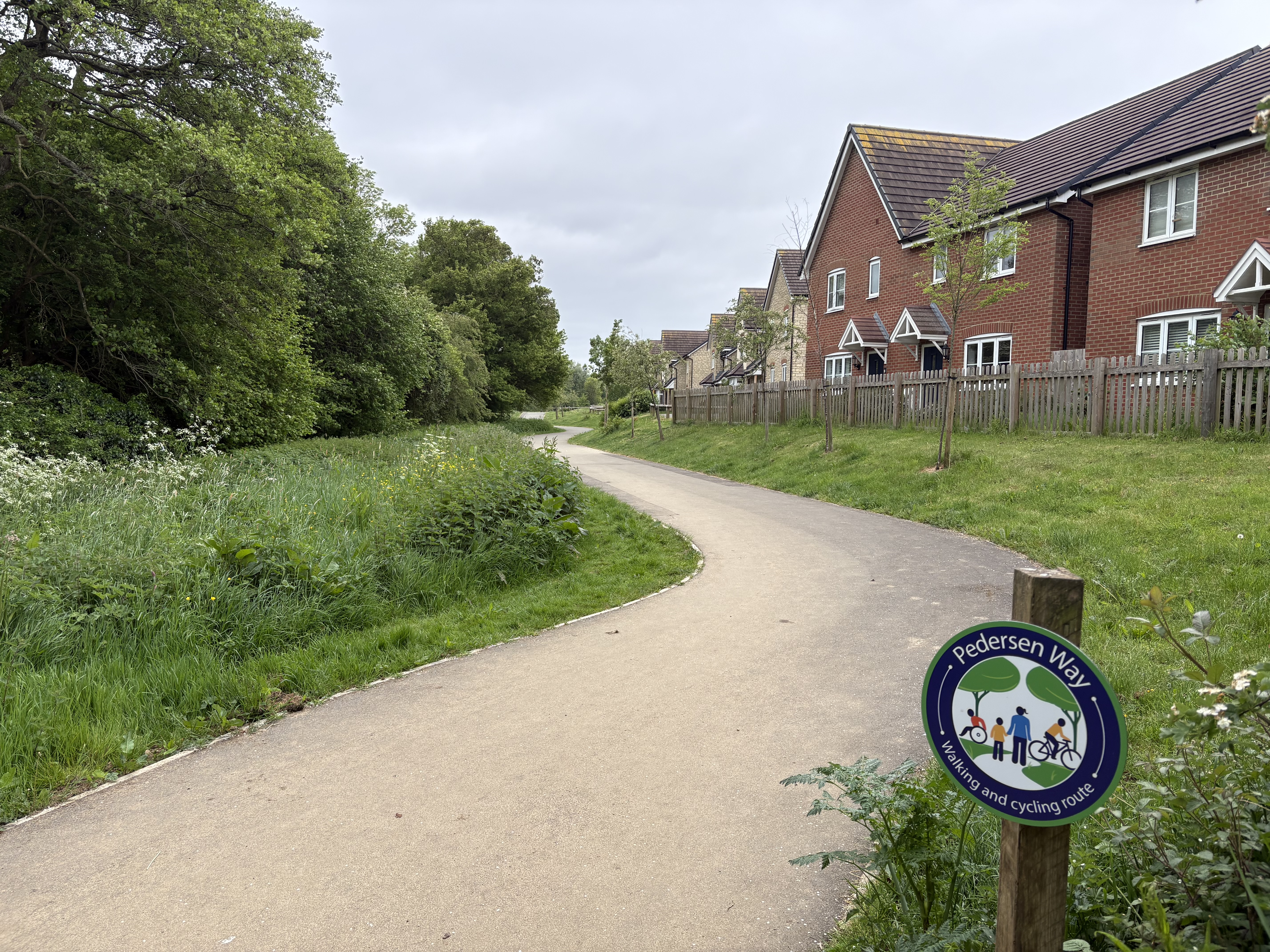
Northern section of Pedersen Way in spring

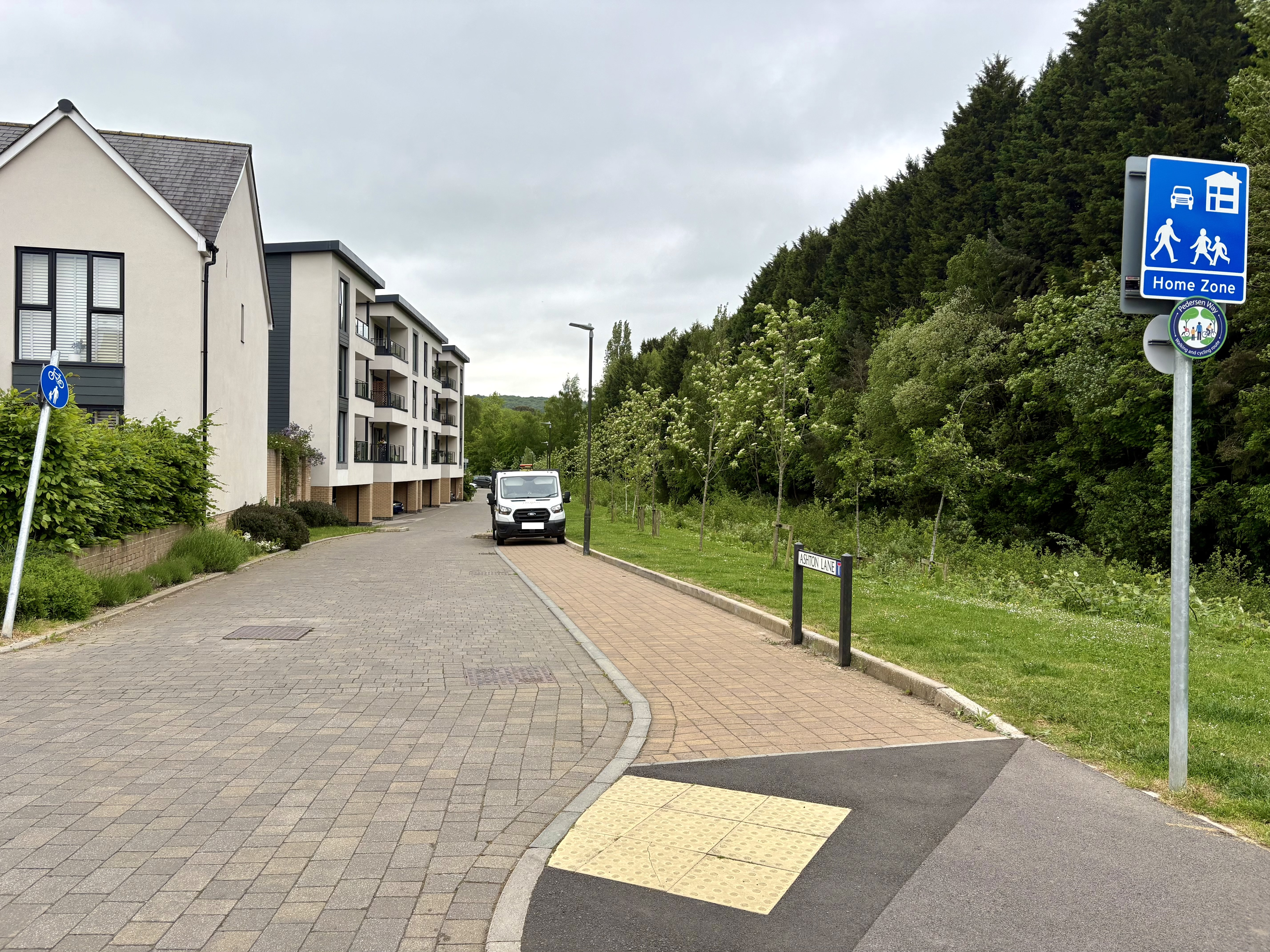
Southern section of Pedersen Way along Ashton Lane

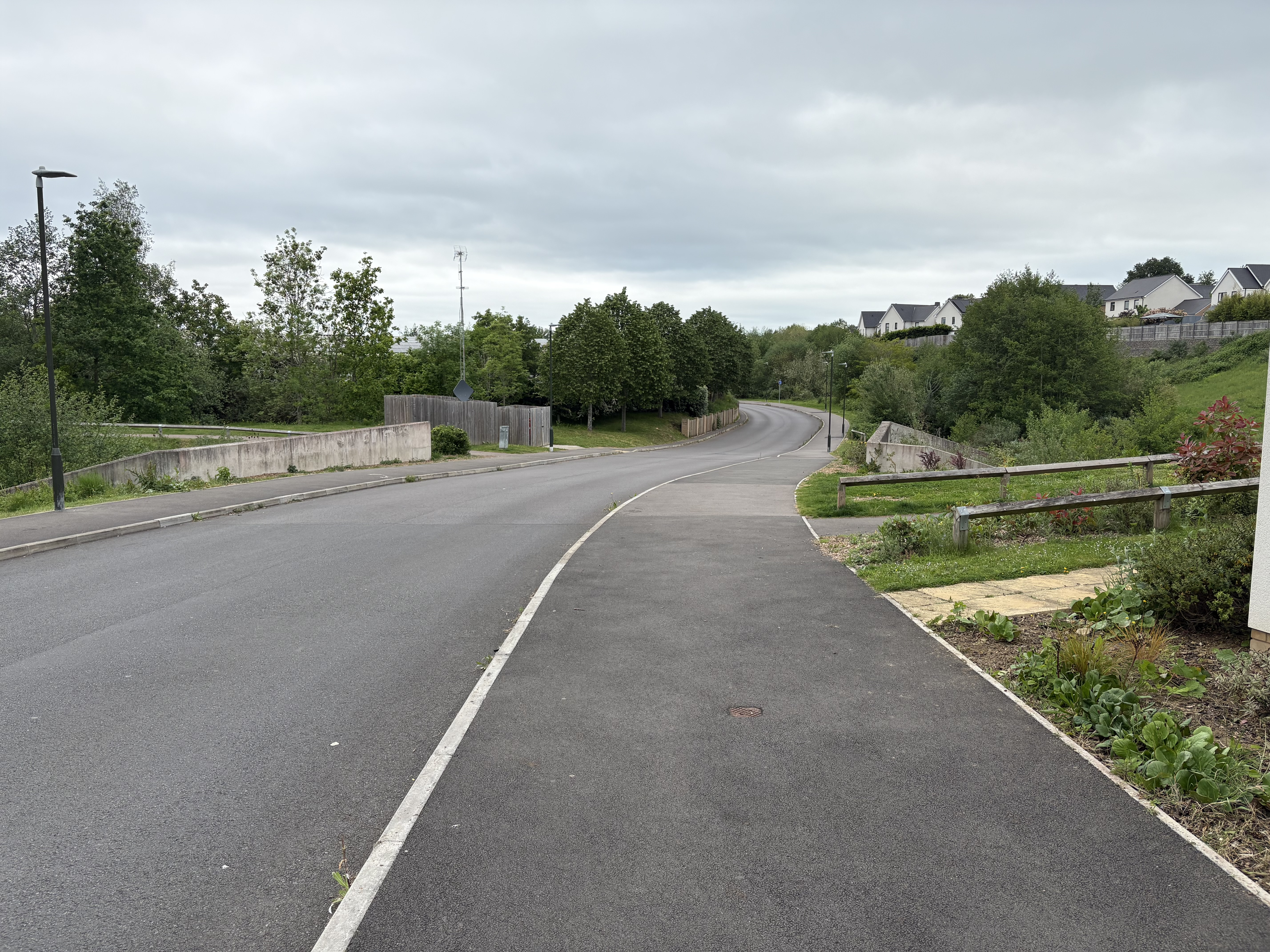
Southern section of Pedersen Way along Lister Road
