= Hundred of Berkeley =

Ancient hundred of Gloucestershire, England

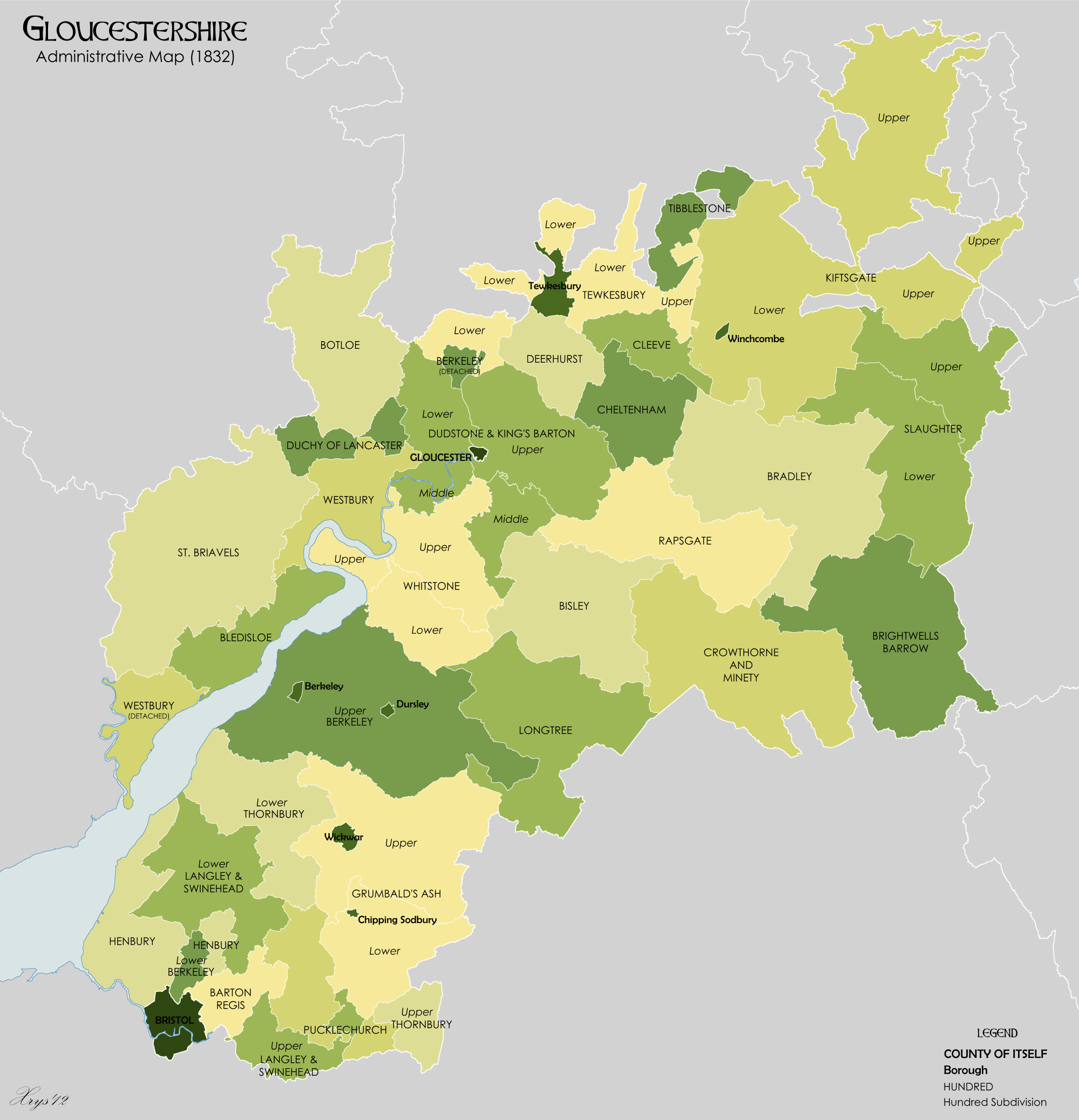
Gloucestershire Hundreds in 1832

The hundred of Berkeley was one of the ancient hundreds of Gloucestershire, England. Hundreds originated in the late Saxon period as a subdivision of a county and lasted as administrative divisions until the 19th century.

Berkeley Hundred was divided into two separate parts, the Lower Division and the Upper Division.

The Lower Division consisted of several detached parts, including the ancient parishes of

- Elberton
- Filton
- Hill
- Horfield
- Almondsbury (part)
- Henbury (part)

The Upper Division consisted of the following parishes:

- Arlingham (a detached part of the hundred, separated from the rest of the hundred by the hundred of Whitstone)
- Ashleworth
- Berkeley
- Beverston
- Cam
- Coaley
- Cromhall Abbots
- Dursley
- Kingscote
- Newington Bagpath
- North Nibley
- Nympsfield
- Owlpen
- Ozleworth
- Slimbridge
- Stinchcombe
- Uley
- Wotton-under-Edge
- Rockhampton (part)

The meeting place was at Berkeley.
