= Dursley railway station =

Former railway station in England

Coordinates: 51.6837°N 2.3515°W

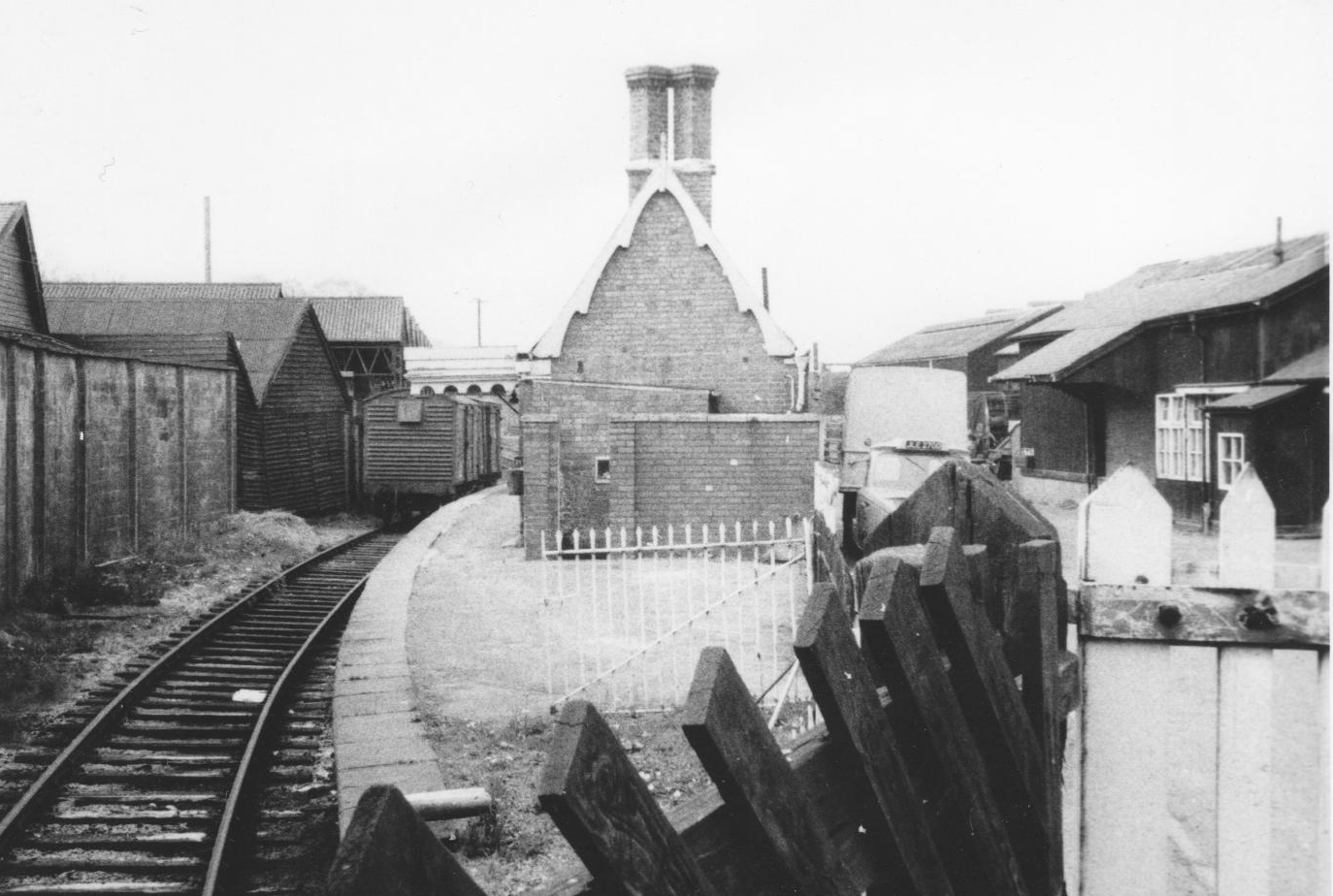
Dursley station, late 1960s, surrounded by Lister's factory

Dursley railway station served the town of Dursley in Gloucestershire, England, and was the terminus of the short Dursley and Midland Junction Railway line which linked the town to the Midland Railway's Bristol to Gloucester line at Coaley Junction.

== History ==
The railway, just 2 1/4 miles (3.6 km) long, ran along the valley of the river Cam. Dursley station was situated at the bottom of the town, in a marshy area that was later developed by the engineering group R A Lister and Company. Though Listers and other factories provided considerable freight traffic for the railway, the distance from the town limited passenger numbers.

The station opened with the line in 1856 and consisted of a single platform with a small brick building. The basic arrangements for passengers stayed much the same throughout the station's life, with some expansion of the station building. But Dursley developed considerably for goods traffic with increased sidings and a goods shed, and further facilities inside the Lister works which came to surround the station.

Journeys between Coaley Junction railway station and Dursley took only 10 minutes and around half a dozen trains were provided each day, with excursion traffic in the summer. The trains that ran on the line were affectionately known as the "Dursley Donkey".

Passenger traffic was vulnerable to competition from buses which served the town centre, and they ceased on 10 September 1962. Goods services continued under British Rail regularly to 1966 and irregularly to 1968, and even after that the line was retained as a private siding to Listers, closing only in 1970 after a road accident severed the line. The station was subsumed within the Lister factory and no trace now remains.

Coaley Junction, where the Dursley line joined the main line, remained open for passenger traffic until 1965 when it was closed with the withdrawal of stopping train services between Bristol and Gloucester. However, local pressure for a station resulted in the opening of a new station close to Coaley in 1994, and this is known as Cam and Dursley.

== Stationmasters ==
- H. Turner until 1859
- H. Jakeway 1859 - 1861
- E. Skeffington 1861 (formerly station master at Halton)
- B. Robinson 1861 - 1862
- W. Webberley 1862 - 1864
- H. Somers 1864 -
- J. Bedington until 1874 (afterwards station master at Berkeley Road)
- W. Beck 1875 - 1876 (formerly station master at Rowsley)
- W. Chorley 1877 - 1879 (afterwards station master at Berkeley Road)
- J. Delphin 1879 - 1880 (formerly station master at Nottingham Road, Derby)
- T.W. Cox 1880 - 1889 (afterwards station master at Wirksworth)
- G.W. Potter 1889
- R. Herbert 1889 - 1894 (formerly station master at Borrowash, afterwards station master at Oakham)
- J. Belcher 1894 - 1901 (formerly station master at Woodchester, afterwards station master at Warmley)
- Walter Sidney Warren 1901 - 1923 (formerly station master at Salford Priors)
- Albert Hemming 1924 - 1937
- F.A. Cook 1937 - 1947 (formerly station master at Charfield, afterwards station master at Keighley)

== Services ==
Preceding station	Disused railways	Following station
Cam; Line and station closed	Dursley and Midland Junction Railway; Midland Railway	Terminus
