= Cam railway station =

Former railway station in Gloucestershire, England

Coordinates: 51.69884°N 2.35954°W

Cam
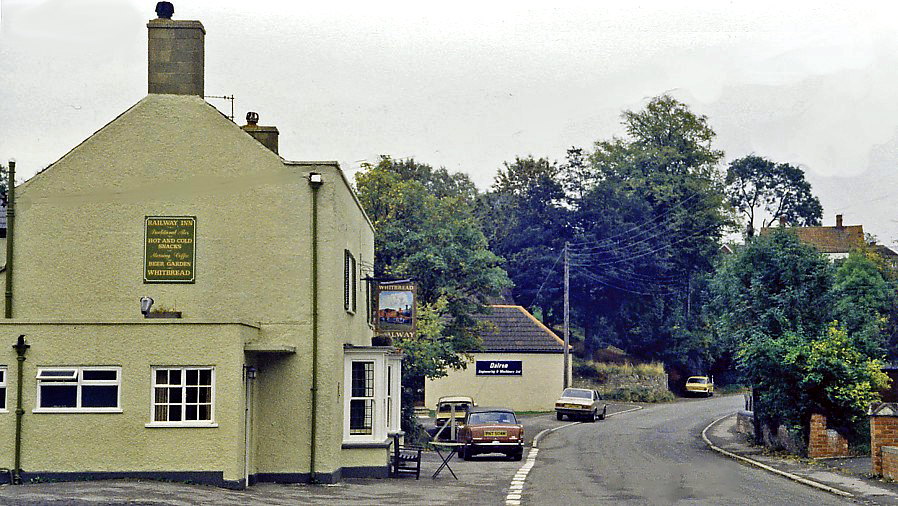
- Site of the former station in 1986

General information
- Location: Cam, Stroud; England
- Platforms: 1

Other information
- Status: Disused

History
- Original company: Dursley and Midland Junction Railway
- Pre-grouping: Midland Railway
- Post-grouping: London Midland and Scottish Railway

Key dates
- 17 September 1856: Opened
- 10 September 1962: Closed
Location

Cam railway station served the village of Cam in Gloucestershire, England. The station was on the short Dursley and Midland Junction Railway line which linked the town of Dursley to the Midland Railway's Bristol to Gloucester line at Coaley Junction.

The railway, just 2.5 miles (4 km) long, ran along the valley of the river Cam. Cam station was situated at northern end of the village, close to the cloth mill of Hunt and Winterbotham, to which there was a siding.

The station opened with the line in 1856 and consisted of a single platform with a brick building and a wooden goods shed. It was the only intermediate station on the line and all passenger trains called there. Journeys between Coaley Junction railway station and Dursley took only 10 minutes and around half a dozen trains were provided each day, with excursion traffic in the summer. The trains that ran on the line were affectionately known as the "Dursley Donkey".

Passenger traffic was vulnerable to competition from buses and services ceased on 10 September 1962. Goods services at Cam also finished then, but the line remained open to goods traffic from Dursley under British Rail regularly to 1966 and irregularly to 1968, and even after that the line was retained as a private siding, finally closing in 1970. Cam station was demolished and no trace now remains.

Coaley Junction, where the Dursley line joined the main line, remained open for passenger traffic until 1965 when it was closed with the withdrawal of stopping train services between Bristol and Gloucester. However, local pressure for a station resulted in the opening of a new station close to Coaley in 1994, and this is known as Cam and Dursley.

== Stationmasters ==
- James Boughton ca. 1859 - 1875
- Joseph Clayfield 1875 - 1885 (afterwards station master at Ryefield)
- William Pridmore 1885 - ca. 1924
- Albert Hemming 1924 - 1937 (also station master at Dursley)
- F.A. Cook 1937 - 1947 (formerly station master at Charfield, also station master at Dursley, afterwards station master at Keighley)

== Services ==
| Preceding station | Disused railways | Following station |
|---|---|---|
| Coaley Junction; Line closed | Dursley and Midland Junction Railway; Midland Railway | Dursley; Line closed |
