= Simon Opher =

British Labour politician

Simon Opher MBE MP
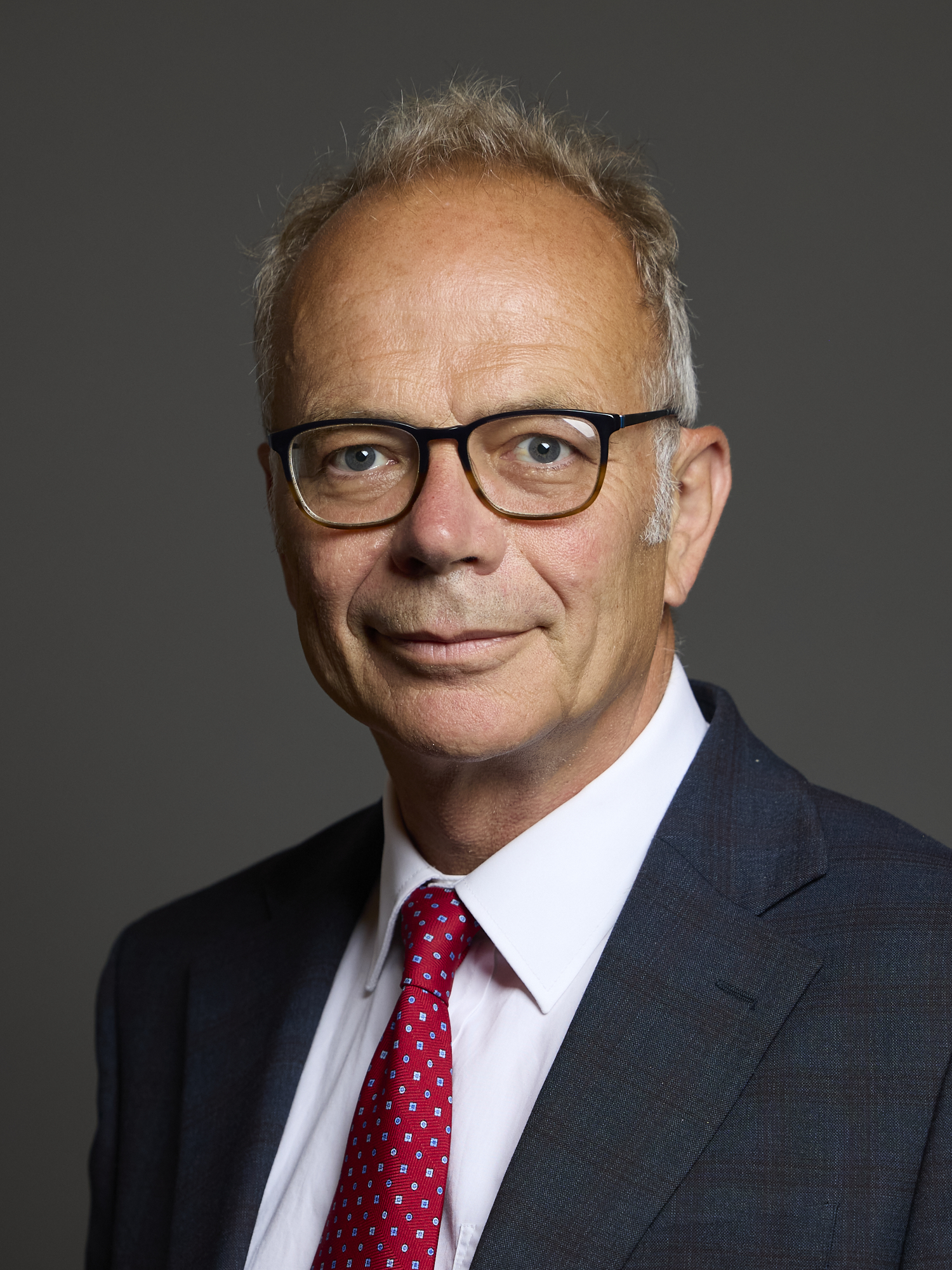
- Official portrait, 2024

Member of Parliament for Stroud
- Incumbent
- Assumed office 4 July 2024
- Preceded by: Siobhan Baillie
- Majority: 11,388 (20.7%)

Personal details
- Born: Oxfordshire, England
- Party: Labour
- Education: St Mary's Hospital Medical School
- Occupation: Member of Parliament
- Profession: General practitioner
- Website: https://simonopher.org/

Simon Joseph Opher MBE is a British Labour Party politician and general practitioner who has served as the Member of Parliament (MP) for Stroud since the 2024 general election.

== Early life and career ==
Opher, originally from Oxfordshire, attended a comprehensive school before studying medicine at St Mary's Hospital Medical School in London. Prior to becoming an MP he worked and lived in Dursley as a full-time GP for "almost exactly 29 years" with his wife, Rachel; their three children attended the local Rednock School. He was awarded an MBE in 2016 for introducing and advocating social prescribing (now part of NHS policy nationwide) and was instrumental in the building of the Vale Community Hospital. Chairman of the Stroud Locality NHS, Opher headed the COVID-19 vaccination scheme locally and has remained working as a GP when time permits.

== Political career ==
In July 2022, Opher replaced former Labour MP David Drew as the Labour prospective parliamentary candidate for Stroud. He has served as the Member of Parliament for Stroud since the 2024 general election, where he defeated Conservative incumbent Siobhan Baillie. Opher polled 25,607 votes to Baillie's 14,219.

Opher made his maiden speech on 5 September 2024 in a debate on renewable energy. He speaks regularly in Parliament on a range of issues, particularly around health and poverty.

He sits on a number of All Party Parliamentary Groups, and is Chair of the Health Group and vice-chair of the Net Zero Group.

In November 2024, Opher co-ordinated a group of MPs who are also medics and support assisted dying. The cross-party group called on colleagues to support legislation from Labour MP Kim Leadbeater, calling on Parliament to be “brave enough to change the law in this difficult area for the benefit of patients”.

Continuing his advocacy for social prescribing, alongside Craic Health, Opher supported the launch of a scheme called 'Comedy-on-Prescription'. Aimed at tackling social isolation and poor mental health, Opher said in Parliament that “making people laugh can avoid the need for medication”. Alongside Craic founder Lu Jackson, Opher chaired a panel discussion at the inaugural SXSW London with the comedian Jonathon Pie to discuss the benefits of Comedy-on-Prescription.

Opher advocates for the safety and protection of healthcare workers in the Gaza Strip. He has spoken in the House about the deliberate targeting of healthcare workers by the Israeli Defence Forces in the Gaza War. In September 2025, Opher and fellow MP Peter Prinsley were denied entry into Israel during a trip to the occupied West Bank organised by the Council for Arab-British Understanding. The pair were part of a parliamentary delegation observing medical and humanitarian work being undertaken by Medical Aid for Palestinians and other organisations. The British Foreign Office described the denial as "totally unacceptable and deeply concerning."

Opher regards himself as being a Labour traditionalist and is a founding member of Mainstream. He has voted overwhelmingly for the government since being elected, the notable exception being over proposed reductions to welfare payments.

== Interests ==
Opher is chair of the charity that runs Prema Arts Centre, vice-president of the Cotswold Canals Trust and President of Uley Cricket Club.

Parliament of the United Kingdom
Preceded by Siobhan Baillie	Member of Parliament for Stroud; 2024–present	Incumbent
