= Cam Congregational Church =

Church in Gloucestershire, England

Coordinates: 51.6913°N 2.3531°W

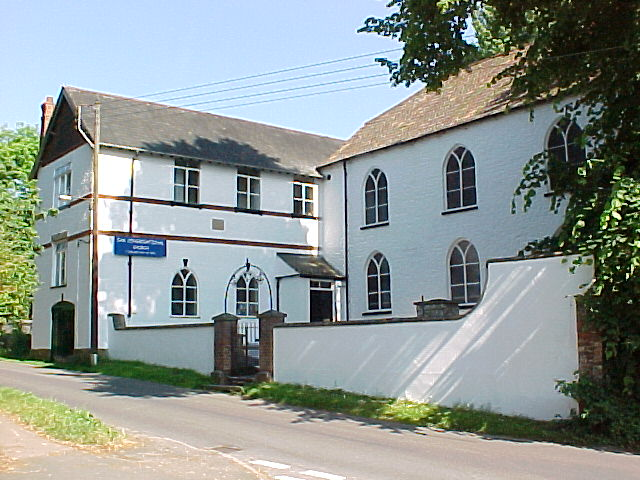
Cam Congregational Church

Cam Congregational Church in the village of Upper Cam near the market town of Dursley, Gloucestershire. Founded in 1662, and originally known as Cam Independent Meeting, it was the first Nonconformist chapel in the area. It is a Grade II Listed Building in Cam, Gloucestershire, England.

== History ==
Cam Independent Chapel for example was built in 1702 on land donated by the clothier William Hicks.

Records from 1776-1972 are held by Gloucestershire Archives. They include: certificates of registry of deaths 1882-1972; minutes 1903-1934; accounts 1776-1921 and pew rent books 1791-1944; Sunday School minutes 1892-1914, accounts 1891-1908 and attendance registers 1913-1922; papers concerning the history of the church, including account of its history from the 17th to 19th centuries (1933), and notes on the organ, including a photograph (2005). It also contains records of Dursley Water Street Charity School: accounts 1758-1887; trustees' minutes 1822-1873.

In June 2008, Cotswold Community Church members joined with Cam Congregational Church and the chapel was later renamed 3C Community Church.

=== Ministers ===
From 1662 to 2008 there have been twenty two ordained ministers at Cam Congregational Church.

The first minister was appointed in 1702 was Joseph Twemlow, who was born in Cheshire in 1673. The first record of his pastorate was to baptize Hannah Harper on 7 June 1702. He also opened a school in his own house in 1715 for teaching poor children of Protestant Dissenters in the Dursley area in Water Street, where it provided education for local children for the next hundred and seventy two years. After this it became the Twemlow Trust, giving grants to children and young people to help with their education and training. Retiring in 1738 and died on 22 August 1740 aged 67 and is buried in the churchyard. Nicholas Martyn became the next pastor in 1738, and received the annual sum of £40. In 1745, he was succeeded by Hornblower, who was ordained in 1745 and whose ministry ended in 1766. The next minister was Rev Perry Bartlett from 1767. Bartlett stayed until 1771 when he was succeeded by William Billingsley in 1772, but Billingsley died of tuberculosis in 1776. Rev John Thomas became pastor and served for forty years. In 1806, he married Miss Mary Dyer of Cromhall. Thomas died in 1816 and his wife in 1840. Rev Thomas Griffiths succeeded Thomas and oversaw the completion of the renovation and remodelling of the chapel in June 1818. Rev C. Thomas, who had been pastor of North Nibley Tabernacle, succeeded Griffiths and was joined in the pastorate by Andrew Gazard in 1842. Thomas died in 1861, and Gazard continued as pastor and bought the land for the Quarry Independent Chapel at the cost of £14 and oversaw the building being built for £130 and opened in 1852. Gazard died on 22 August 1869, and he was succeeded by Rev James Williams in 1871. Williams stayed in ministry for twenty-one years, during which time a new Sweetland organ from Bath was installed at the cost of £200 in 1881. He resigned his pastorate in 1893. In 1894, Rev David Truss of the New Metropolitan Tabernacle, London, became pastor and lived in the old Manse in Lower Cam. He attended the foundation stone-laying ceremony of the new church classrooms of that year; these classrooms were opened on May Day 1895. On 28 May 1905, Truss ended his time as pastor. Owen Griffiths became pastor in March 1907, encouraging the membership to sign the Temperance Book and take "The Pledge" to abstain from all intoxicating drinks. He resigned his pastorate in 1919.

The first Minister to occupy the new Manse, situated next to the chapel in Church Road, was Rev Charles Llewellyn Allen. He remained at Cam until his death in 1933 following a road accident. The next pastor, J. R. Davison was inducted on 18 July 1934, but he died in 1938 after an illness and operation. Early in 1938, a scheme was established linking the ministries at Cam Meeting and Cambridge Union Chapel (now demolished) on the Bristol Road near Slimbridge. Rev Hugh Towl became minister through the Second World War, until he left in 1944. In the following years, the church was served by Rev Levi John Evans. 1946-1954, Rev E.M Hodge 1955-1961, Rev Louis Mares (1963-1966), Rev Lionel Anderson (1967-1970) and Rev Marshall Jones (1973-1975) with Rev Hodge continuing to preach and assist the chapel throughout his retirement, along with lay preachers. In 1975, the church decided by vote of the membership to join the Congregational Federation of Churches. Brian Stamps, a schoolmaster at Slimbridge, became the next pastor in 1978 and retired in 1990. Then a voluntary Lay Leadership Team (1990-2008)

Baptist Evangelist Noel Fellowes became the minister of the newly formed 3C Community Church in 2008. Phil Greenow became the minister of the church in 2018.

== Architecture ==
In 1894, Rev David Truss attended the foundation-stone-laying ceremony of the new classrooms. These classrooms were opened on May Day 1895. Over the years the buildings deteriorated before renovation work started in 1993. Renovation of the church hall and schoolrooms with new entrance hall, kitchen, toilets and upstairs rooms converted into a three bedroomed flat.

The two-storey stone building has a tiled hipped roof. The interior is panelled and there is a U-shaped balcony which is supported on cast-iron pillars. There is a central pulpit reached via steps. The present building was erected about 1702, with a wing being added in 1895. It was much altered in 1818, and Sunday-school rooms and hall were added in 1895. The upper floor of the attached schoolrooms and hall was converted into a three bedroomed flat for use if needed by future ministers. Accessibility was addressed with advice from the Evangelical Alliance of which the church was a member. A car park and driveway, plus extensions for a new kitchen and toilets were completed in 1995. Complete remodelling of the chapel interior took place in 1999.

The pews installed 1818 could be reserved, for which a rental was charged and a card bearing your name slipped into a brass holder at the end of the pew. In 1998, a decision was made to remodel the chapel interior by replacing the pews with comfortable chairs and completely redecorating the interior of the chapel. Planning permission was granted and eighty-four chairs replaced the old pews in 1999 while retaining the U-shape balcony supported by seven slender Batty Langley-style cast iron columns, the central pulpit on the north wall with steps and dais, a Parliament clock from the 18th century and a Sweetland organ (a two manual pedal instrument by Sweetland of Bath) installed in 1881 at the cost of £200.

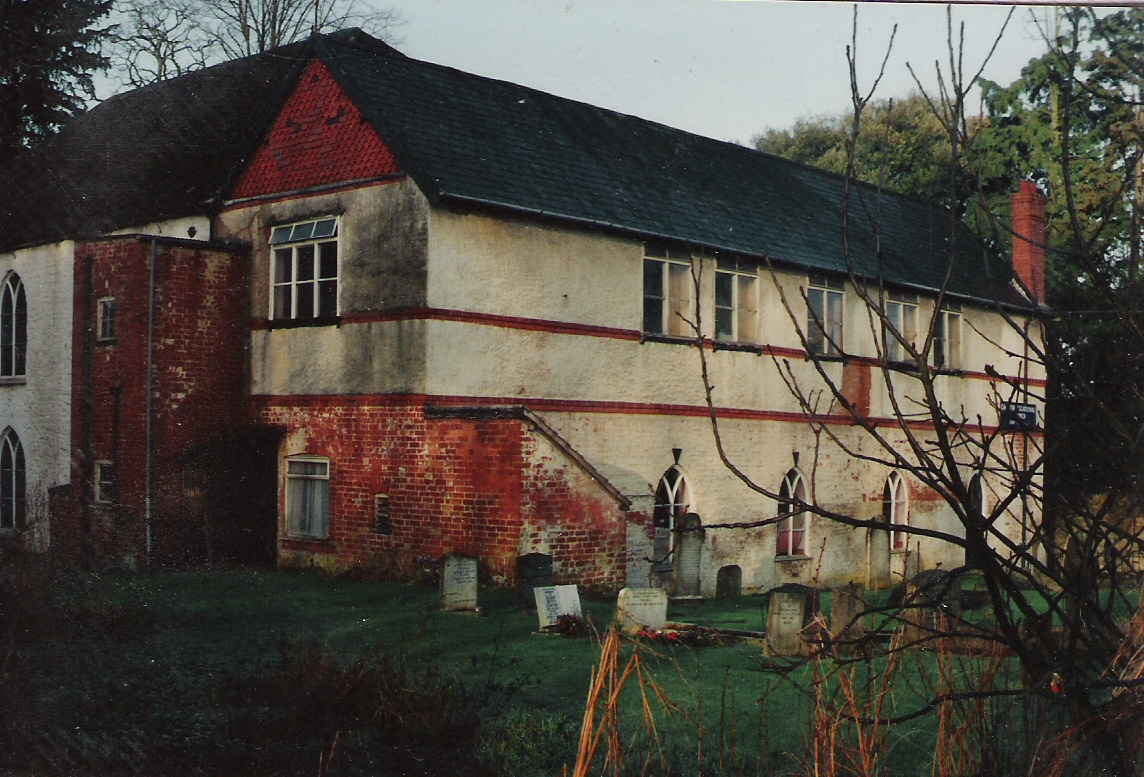
Renovation work from 1993 to 1995

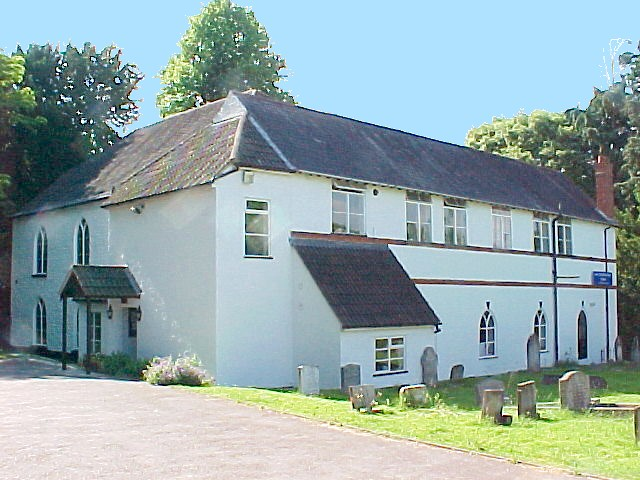
Extension work in 1995

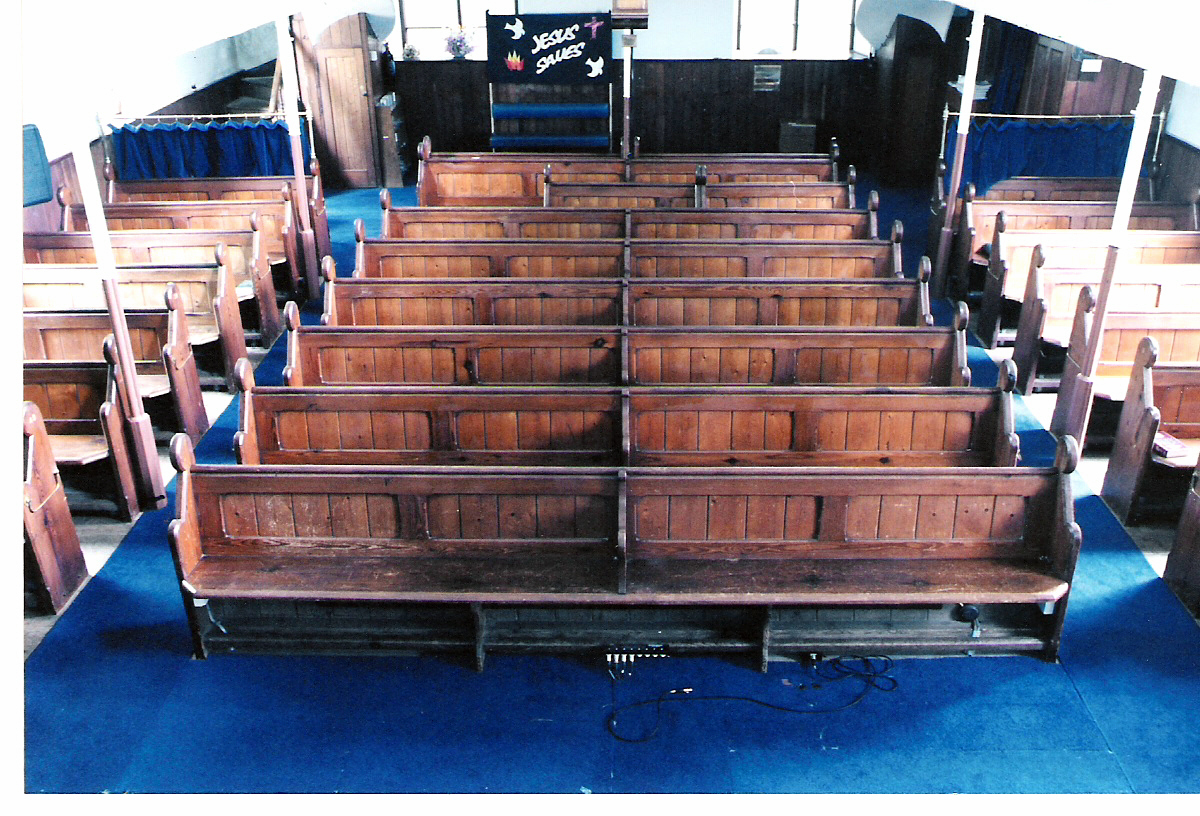
Pews (installed in 1818)

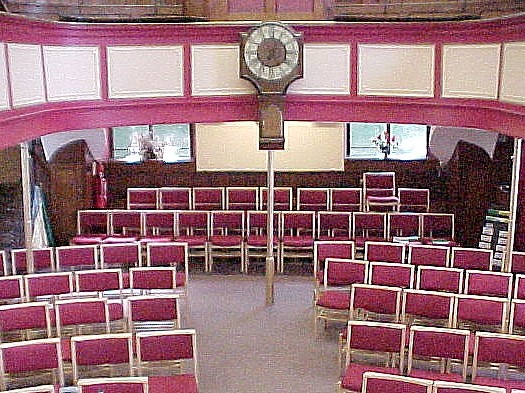
Chairs that replaced the pews in 1999 and Parliament clock (installed in 1818)

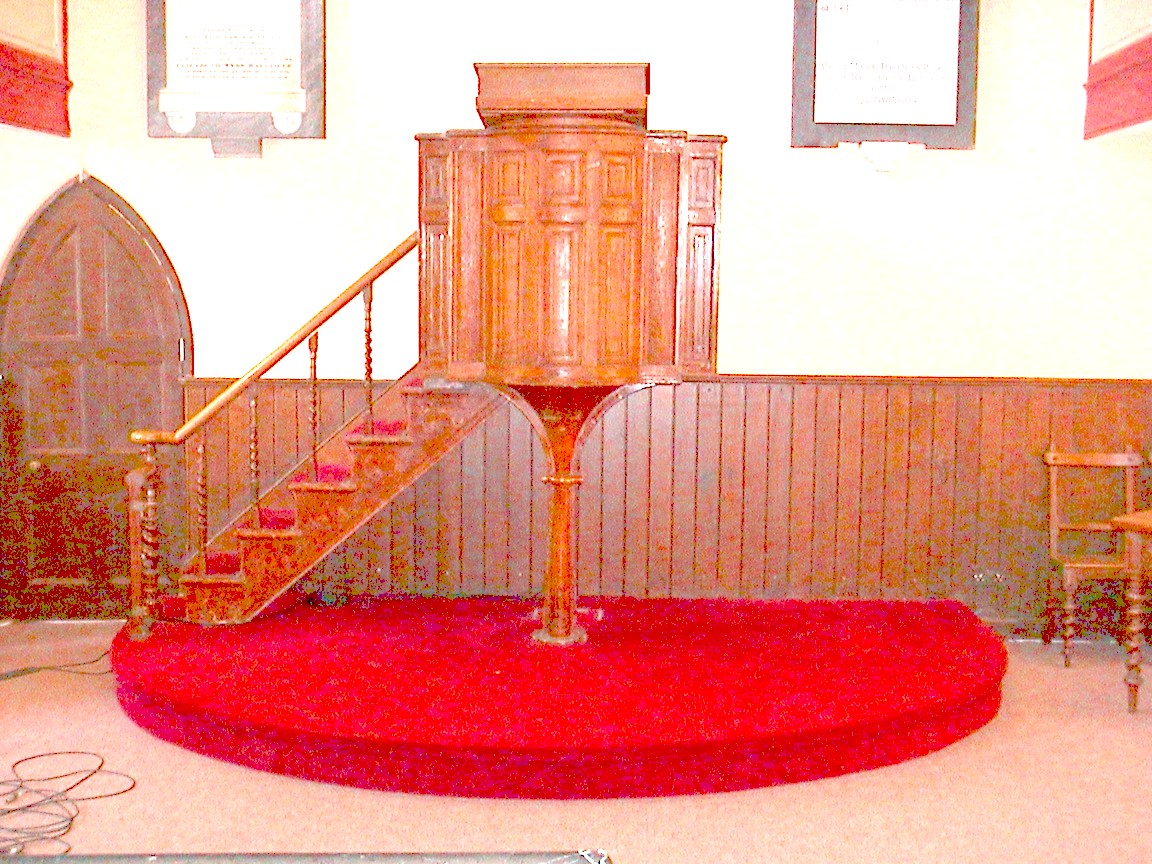
Central pulpit reached via steps (installed in 1818)

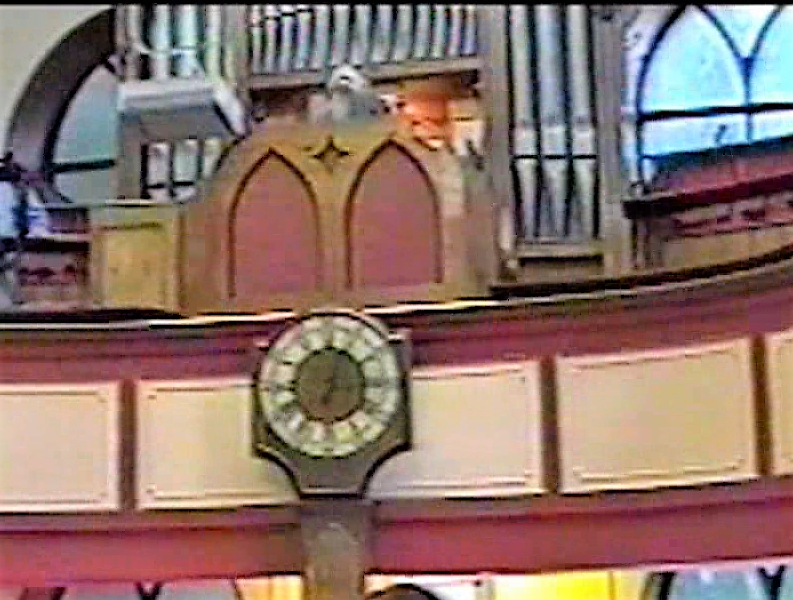
Sweetland organ (installed in 1881)

== Bibliography ==
- Snelling, Diana; Snelling, John (2001). A Faith for the Future. Dianthus. ISBN 978-0946604197.
