= A4135 road =

Road in England

A4135

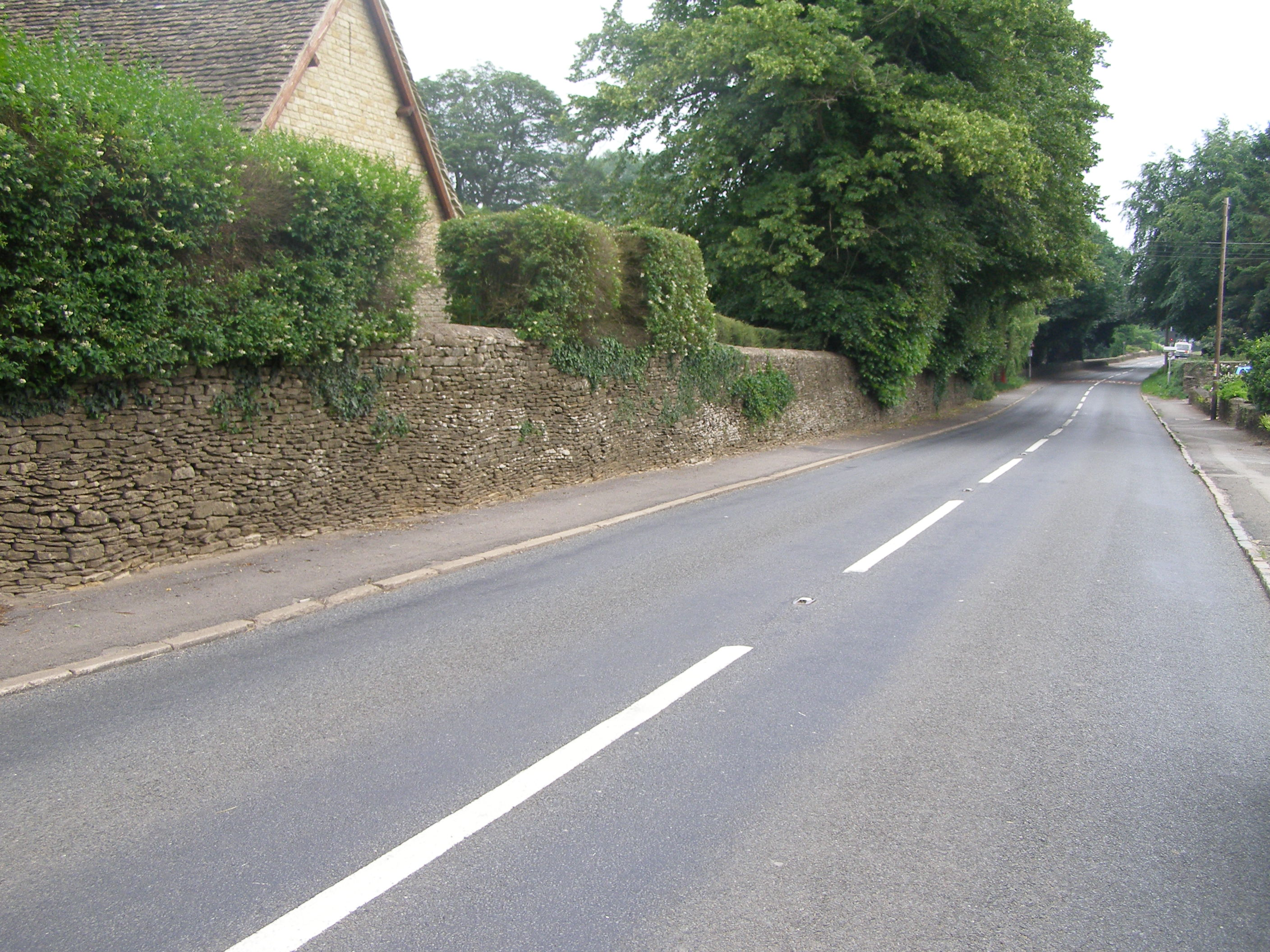
- Looking east along the A4135 road in the village of Beverston

Route information
- Length: 12.9 mi (20.8 km)

Major junctions
- southeast end: Tetbury; 51.6390°N 2.1621°W
- A433; A46; A38
- northwest end: Slimbridge; 51.7234°N 2.3717°W

Location
- Country: United Kingdom

Road network
- Roads in the United Kingdom; Motorways; A and B road zones
← A4133	→ A4136

The A4135 road is a road in Gloucestershire, England. It connects the town of Tetbury with the M5 motorway and the A38 road to the west, passing through Beverston, Dursley and Cam en route to Slimbridge.

== 2001 Dursley speed camera ==
In 2001 a speed camera was installed at Dursley with an associated speed limit zone of 30 miles per hour (48 km/h). The image (right) depicts a typical stretch of the A4135 road; the dry-stone wall illustrated is of considerable age.

== See also ==
- Slimbridge Wildfowl Trust
