= Alex Seville =

English rugby union player (born 1998)

- Born: Alexander Morton Seville; 12 July 1998 (age 28) Gloucester, England
- Height: 1.80 m (5 ft 11 in)
- Weight: 107 kg (16 st 12 lb)
- School: Rednock School; Hartpury College

Rugby union career
- Position: Prop
Senior career
Years	Team	Apps	(Points)
2017–2018	Hartpury College	2	(0)
2018–2024	Gloucester	45	(0)
2020	→ Northampton Saints	2	(0)
- Correct as of 31 December 2022
International career
Years	Team	Apps	(Points)
2016	England U18s	7	(0)
2017–2018	England U20s	15	(0)
- Correct as of 6 September 2019

Alex Seville (born 12 July 1998) is an English former rugby union player. A prop, he spent the majority of his career with Gloucester and represented England at youth level. He now works for Neptune.

== Career ==
Seville studied at Hartpury College and joined Gloucester's Senior Academy from the 2016–17 season. He became a member of the Hartpury College AASE when he was 16 and has represented Stroud District Schools, Bath & North-East Somerset and the Gloucestershire U16 side. He was part of Hartpury College on a dual-registered basis in the RFU Championship during the 2017–18 season.

In January 2017, Seville was named in the England U20 team for the 2017 Six Nations Under 20s Championship as an injury replacement and featured during the tournament as they completed a grand slam. Later that year he played in the final of the 2017 World Rugby Under 20 Championship which England lost against New Zealand. Seville was also included in the squad for the 2018 World Rugby Under 20 Championship and started in the final as England were defeated by hosts France to finish runners up again.

On 17 December 2018, Seville signed his first professional contract to stay with Gloucester, thus promoted to the senior squad for the 2019–20 season. He joined Premiership Rugby club Northampton Saints on short-term loan until the end of September on 18 September 2020. He made two appearances for Northampton including their European Rugby Champions Cup quarter-final defeat against Exeter Chiefs.

In July 2024 it was announced that Seville had left Gloucester.

== Honours ==
England U20

- Six Nations Under 20s Championship: 2017
- World Rugby Junior World Championship runner-up: 2017, 2018
