= Coaley =

Village in Gloucestershire, England

Coordinates: 51.7118°N 2.3328°W

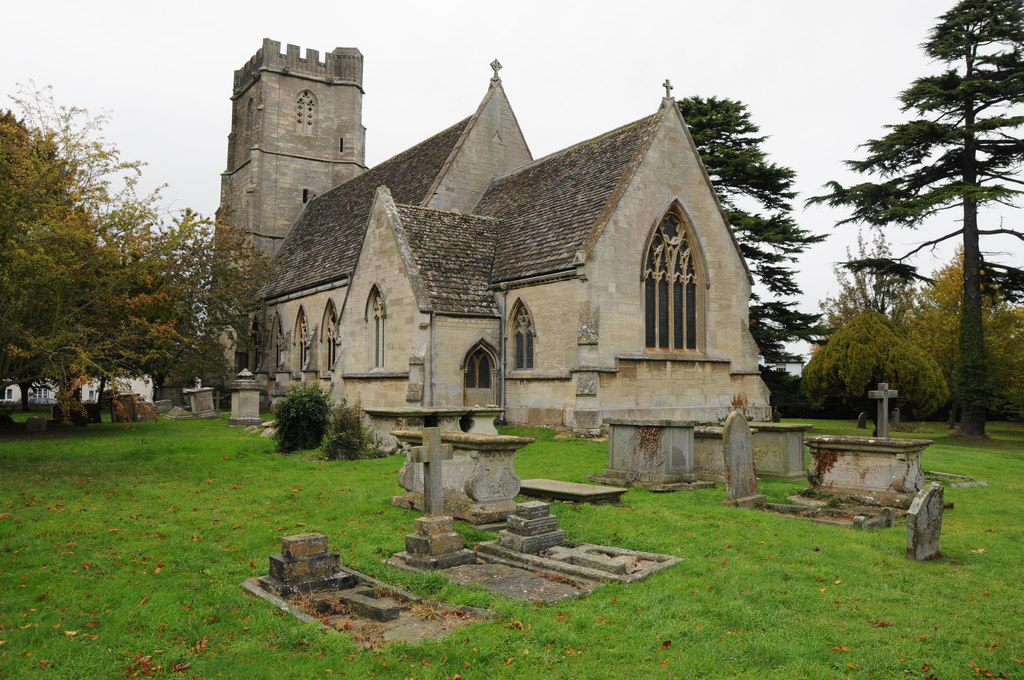
- Coaley church

- Location within Gloucestershire
- Population: 828 (2021 Census)
- OS grid reference: SO771015
- Civil parish: Coaley
- District: Stroud
- Shire county: Gloucestershire
- Region: South West
- Country: England
- Sovereign state: United Kingdom
- Post town: DURSLEY
- Postcode district: GL11
- Dialling code: 01453
- Police: Gloucestershire
- Fire: Gloucestershire
- Ambulance: South Western
- UK Parliament: Stroud

Coaley is a village in the English county of Gloucestershire roughly 4 miles from the town of Dursley, and 5 miles from the town of Stroud. The village drops from the edge of the Cotswold Hills, overlooked by Frocester Hill and Coaley Peak picnic site, towards the River Cam at Cam and Cambridge and the Severn Estuary beyond. It has a population of around 770.

Coaley has many amenities, including a 300-year-old pub, the Old Fox (was The Fox and Hounds until November 2018), awarded the Cotswold Life Food & Drink Awards Pub of The Year 2022, the Coaley C of E Primary School, a church, a village hall, and a community shop, recently re-opened in a new building, with coffee shop facilities. Cam and Dursley railway station (near the former Coaley Junction station) was reopened in 1994 (the original closed in 1965) and is situated on the South-Western border of the village.

Coaley used to have a football team, Coaley Rovers, who were also known as Coaley Crows. They competed in the Stroud and District League. There is also a Coaley Cricket Club. Coaley also holds an annual produce show, which has been held since 1942 on the first Saturday in September.

In 2003, Coaley was crowned Gloucestershire village of the year in a Calor-sponsored competition organised by Gloucestershire Rural Community Council, and went on to pick up a runner-up prize in the national competition, in recognition of local residents' efforts to develop community organisations and enterprises.

Local legend has it that one of the original script writers of The Archers, Geoffrey Webb, drank regularly in the (now closed) Swan Public House in the village, and his experiences helped inspire the long-running radio serial.

== Governance ==
The village falls in 'Coaley and Uley' electoral ward. This ward starts in the north near the M5 motorway and stretches south to Uley. The total population of this ward taken at the 2011 census was 2,299.
