= Cambridge, Gloucestershire =

Hamlet in Gloucestershire, England

Coordinates: 51.732°N 02.365°W

Cambridge
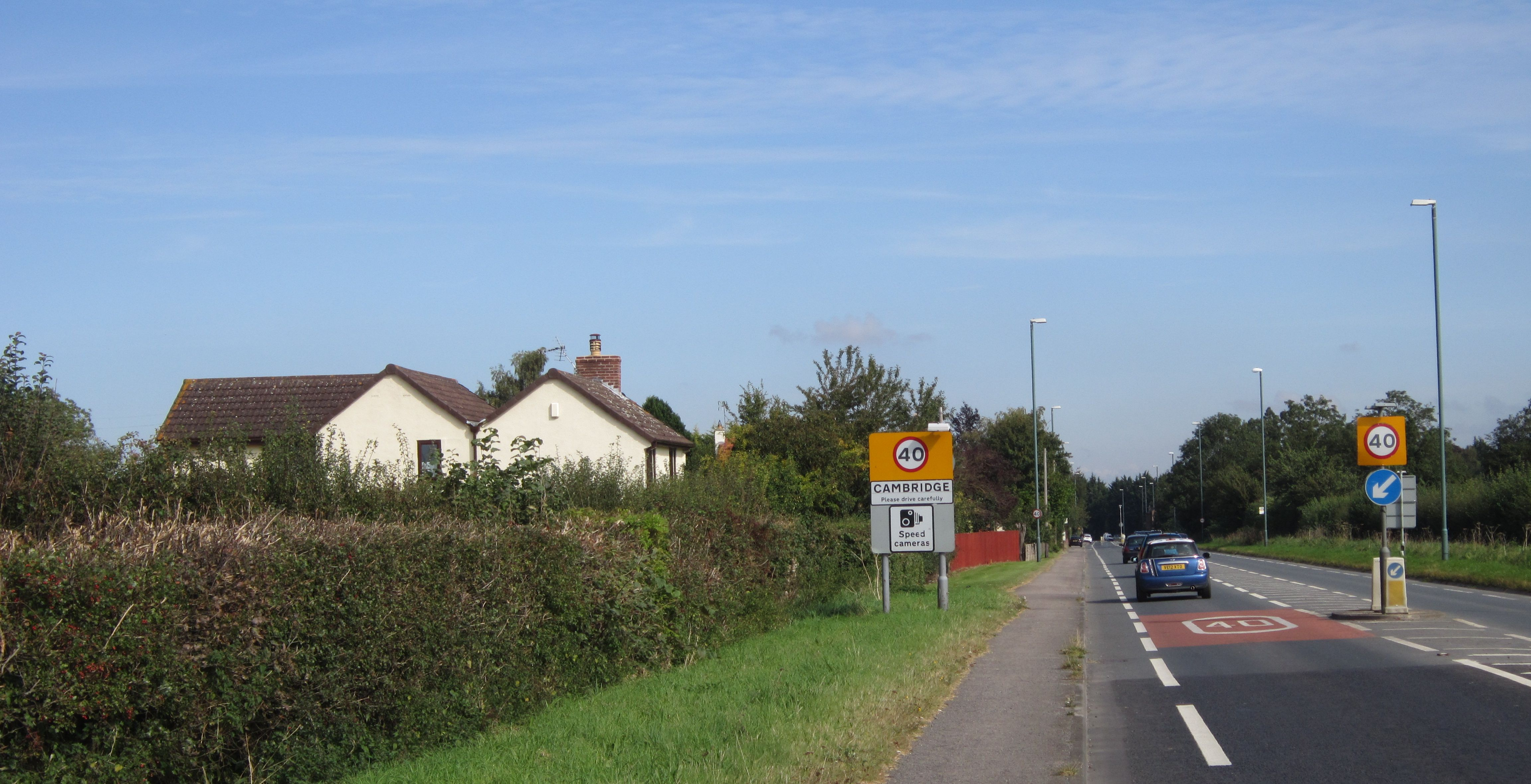
- Village entrance

- Location within Gloucestershire
- OS grid reference: SO749037
- Civil parish: Slimbridge
- District: Stroud
- Shire county: Gloucestershire
- Region: South West
- Country: England
- Sovereign state: United Kingdom
- Post town: GLOUCESTER
- Postcode district: GL2
- Dialling code: 01453
- Police: Gloucestershire
- Fire: Gloucestershire
- Ambulance: South Western
- UK Parliament: Stroud

Cambridge (/ˈkæmbrɪdʒ/ KAM-brij) is a hamlet in the district of Stroud, in the county of Gloucestershire, England. It lies on the A38 road between Bristol and Gloucester. It is about 3 miles (5 km) from Dursley and about 11 miles (18 km) from Gloucester.

The hamlet lies in the civil parish of Slimbridge and takes its name from the River Cam which flows through it. It has one public house, the George Inn. A second, the White Lion, closed and became a private residence. There are regular buses to Bristol, Gloucester, Stroud and Thornbury.

In nearby Slimbridge is the Wildfowl and Wetlands Trust, that was founded by Peter Scott.

In 1870–72, John Marius Wilson's Imperial Gazetteer of England and Wales described Cambridge thus:

CAMBRIDGE, a hamlet in Slimbridge parish, Gloucester; on the river Cam, 4 miles NNW of Dursley. It has a post office under Stonehouse. It was known to the Saxons as Cwatbriege; and was the scene of a battle, in the time of Edward the Elder, between the Saxons and the Danes.

Bishop Ussher identified this Cambridge as the "Cair Grauth" listed among the 28 cities of Britain by the History of the Britons, although this is more often identified with the Cambridge on the River Granta.
