= Henry Witchell =

English cricketer

Personal information
- Full name: Henry Gough Witchell
- Born: 8 April 1906; Dursley, Gloucestershire, England
- Died: 24 August 1965 (aged 59); Cotham Hill, Bristol, England
- Batting: Unknown

Domestic team information
- Years: Team
- 1935: Minor Counties
- 1934–1938: Wiltshire
- 1923: Gloucestershire

Career statistics
Competition	First-class
Matches	3
Runs scored	9
Batting average	3.00
100s/50s	–/–
Top score	5
Balls bowled	–
Wickets	–
Bowling average	–
5 wickets in innings	–
10 wickets in match	–
Best bowling	–
Catches/stumpings	–/–
- Source: Cricinfo, 22 May 2012

Henry Gough Witchell (8 April 1906 – 24 August 1965) was an English cricketer. Witchell's batting style is unknown. He was born at Dursley, Gloucestershire.

Witchell made a single first-class appearance for Gloucestershire against Hampshire in the 1923 County Championship at the Spa Ground, Gloucester. He scored 4 runs in Gloucestershire first-innings, before being dismissed by Alec Kennedy, in what was his only batting innings of a drawn match. Over a decade later he joined Wiltshire, making his debut for the county in the 1934 Minor Counties Championship against the Surrey Second XI. He played minor counties cricket for Wiltshire from 1934 to 1938, making a further thirteen appearances for the county, the last of which came against Dorset. In 1935, he was selected to play for a combined Minor Counties team, making two first-class appearances against Cambridge University at Fenner's, and Oxford University at the University Parks. He batted in only one of these matches, the first against Cambridge University, scoring 5 runs in the Minor Counties first-innings, before being dismissed by Jahangir Khan, while in their second-innings he was dismissed for a duck by John Cameron.

He died at Cotham Hill, Bristol, on 24 August 1965.
