= Lieurey =

- Commune
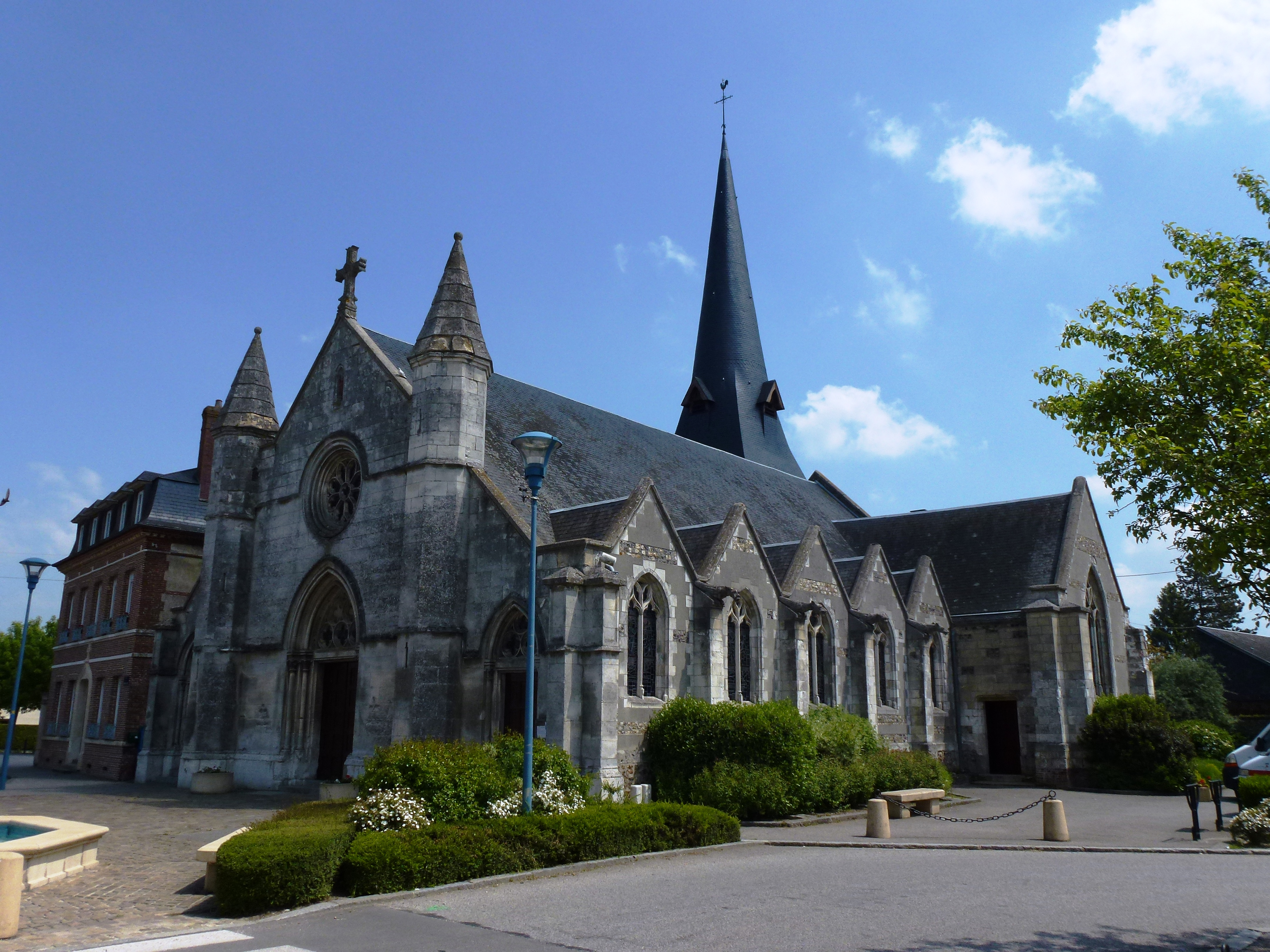
- The church in Lieurey

- Coat of arms
- Location of Lieurey
- Location within France Location within Normandy
- Coordinates: 49°13′51″N 0°30′00″E
- Country: France
- Region: Normandy
- Department: Eure
- Arrondissement: Bernay
- Canton: Beuzeville

Government
  - Mayor (2022–2026): Guy Lainey
- Area^{1}: 18.21 km^{2} (7.03 sq mi)
- Elevation: 170 m (560 ft)
- Highest elevation: 184 m (604 ft)
- Lowest elevation: 138 m (453 ft)
- Population (2023): 1,465
  - Density: 80.45/km^{2} (208.4/sq mi)
- Time zone: UTC+01:00 (CET)
  - Summer (DST): UTC+02:00 (CEST)
- INSEE/Postal code: 27367 /27560
- ^{1} French Land Register data, which excludes lakes, ponds, glaciers > 1 km^{2} (0.386 sq mi or 247 acres) and river estuaries.

Lieurey (French pronunciation: [ljøʁɛ]) is a commune in the Eure department in Normandy in northern France.

== Population ==
Historical population
Year	Pop.	±% p.a.
1968	1,060	—
1975	1,051	−0.12%
1982	1,075	+0.32%
1990	1,155	+0.90%
1999	1,186	+0.29%
2007	1,342	+1.56%
2012	1,401	+0.86%
2017	1,451	+0.70%
2023	1,465	+0.16%
Source: INSEE

== International relations ==
The 14 communes of the former canton of Saint-Georges-du-Vièvre (Normandy, France), including Lieurey, are twinned with Slimbridge (Gloucestershire, England).

== See also ==
- Communes of the Eure department
