= Vale Community Hospital =

- Gloucestershire Health and Care NHS Foundation Trust
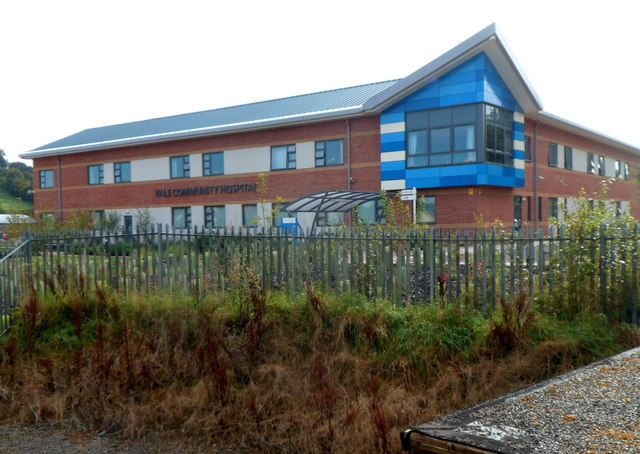
- Vale Community Hospital

- Shown in Gloucestershire

Geography
- Location: Gloucestershire, England
- Coordinates: 51.6892°N 2.3548°W

Organisation
- Care system: NHS
- Type: Community Hospital

History
- Founded: 2012

Links
- Website: Vale Community Hospital
- Lists: Hospitals in England

Vale Community Hospital is a community hospital in Lister Road, Dursley, Gloucestershire, England. It is managed by Gloucestershire Health and Care NHS Foundation Trust.

== History ==
The hospital was commissioned to replace the aging Berkeley Hospital and the Sandpits clinic. The site selected formed part of a large derelict area which had been occupied by Lister engine company and its successor, Lister Petter, and was subsequently developed by Stroud District Council for residential and industrial use. The new hospital, which was built at a cost of £10 million, was opened by the Anne, Princess Royal in February 2012.
