= Dursley and Midland Junction Railway =

Railway in UK

The Dursley and Midland Junction Railway was a company formed to build a railway branch line to connect the town of Dursley in Gloucestershire, England, to the nearby main line between Bristol and Gloucester, at Coaley. The line was opened in 1856, but was immediately loss-making, and the company soon had to sell its line to the Midland Railway.

The line continued in use as a minor rural branch line, and industry located along it sustained it for many years. However, the passenger service was discontinued in 1962 and the line closed completely in 1970.

== Proposals and opening ==
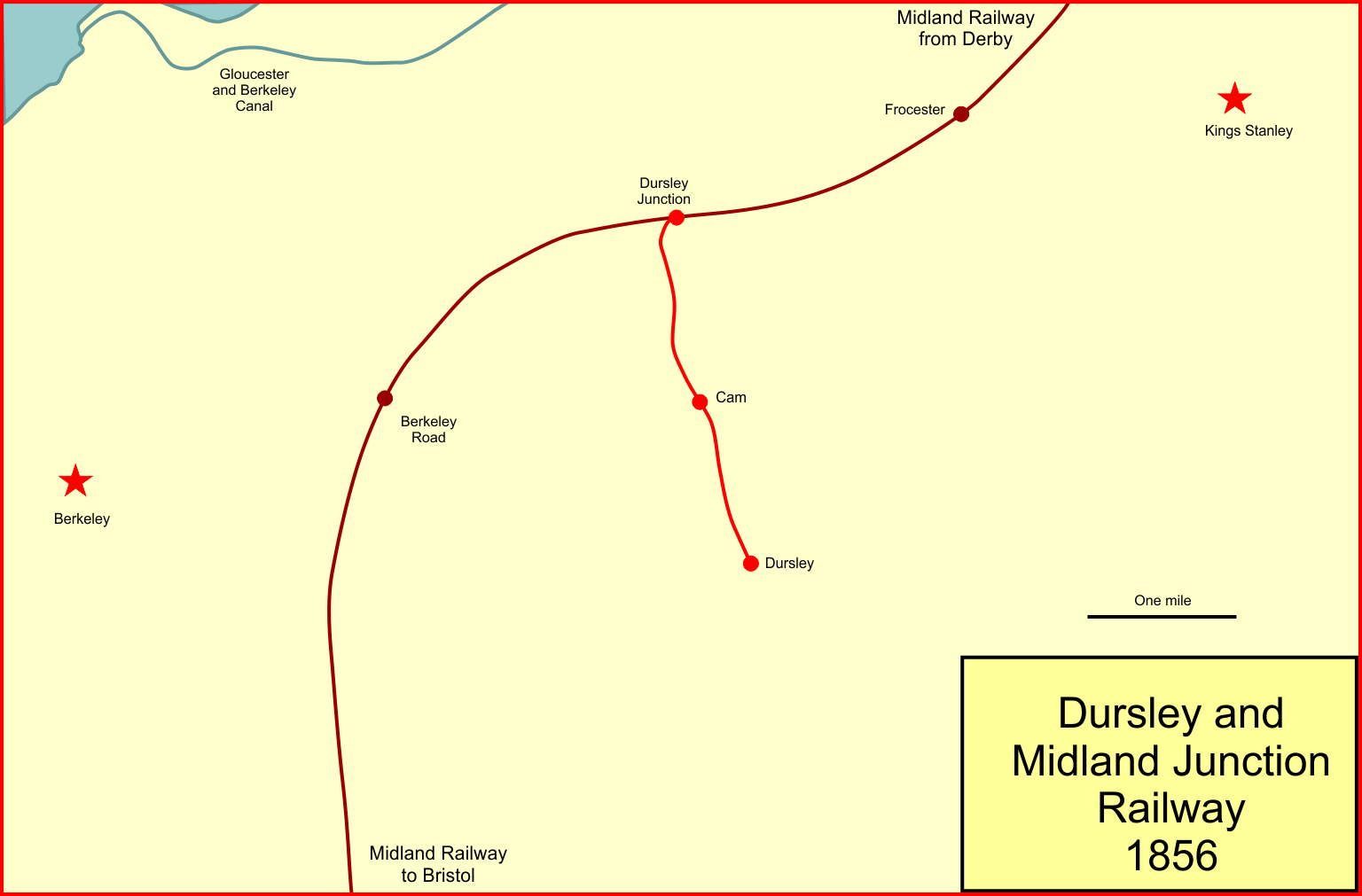
System map of the Dursley and Midland Junction Railway

At the end of the 18th century the Stroudwater Navigation and the Thames and Severn Canal had been opened and provided efficient and cheap transport to the towns it served. The general area was engaged in woollen cloth manufacture, and there were also carpet mills, and the canals gave the nearby town of Stroud a considerable competitive advantage; accordingly, Dursley was declining, not being connected to a means of transport. The Bristol and Gloucester Railway opened its line on 6 July 1844. This appeared to give Dursley the possibility of catching up, but the nearest station was at Frocester, and the B&GR declined to provide a closer station. Even then the railway line was some miles from the town, and it was said that transport from Dursley to the railway would cost as much as the onward transport by rail.

In 1852 a meeting was held at Dursley at which there was considerable support for a branch line railway, but this took some time to arrange. In May 1855 definite proposals were formulated and John Thornhill Harrison was engaged to make a survey for a line. By this time the Bristol and Gloucester Railway had been converted from broad gauge to narrow (standard) gauge, and the Dursley line was therefore to be standard gauge also.

Dursley and Midland Junction Railway Act 1855
- Act of Parliament
- Parliament of the United Kingdom
- Long title: An Act for making a Railway from the Midland Railway in the Parish of Cam in the County of Gloucester to the Town of Dursley.
- Citation: 18 & 19 Vict. c. xvii

Dates
- Royal assent: 25 May 1855

Text of statute as originally enacted

The proposals went to the 1855 session of Parliament, and without much opposition the Dursley and Midland Junction Railway Act 1855 (18 & 19 Vict. c. xvii) received royal assent on 25 May 1855: (Note: According to Smith, and Carter; Maggs incorrectly says 9 May 1855.) the Dursley and Midland Junction Railway was incorporated to build a line 2 miles 47 chains (4.16 km) long from Dursley to a junction with the Midland Railway, successor to the Bristol and Gloucester Railway; the estimated cost of building the line was £12,000.

The Railway shall commence by a Junction with the Bristol and Birmingham Line of the Midland Railway in the Parish of Cam in the County of Gloucester, and shall terminate at or near the Town of Dursley in the same County. — Section 21, Dursley and Midland Junction Railway Act 1855 (18 & 19 Vict. c. xvii)

The Midland Railway was supportive, as the line would be a feeder to it, and subscribed £4,000. A contract was soon let to Thomas and Davis for the construction.

Construction did not take long, and the line was opened to goods traffic on 25 August 1856, soon followed by passenger opening on 18 September 1856. There was one intermediate station, at Cam, and the junction station on the main line was named Dursley Junction at first.

The line had previously been made available for free use by passengers in connection with Gloucester Music Festival; the festival took place from 9 to 12 September 1856, although it is not clear whether the travel was available on all the dates of the festival.

The Midland Railway placed advertisements in newspapers announcing the opening:

Midland Railway: Opening of the Dursley Branch. The public are informed that the above line of railway was opened for passenger traffic between Dursley and Dursley Junction on Wednesday 17th September...

— Bristol Mercury, 20 September 1856

Five trains each way are shown in an appended timetable, of which four are "1 & 2 class" and the 5.05 pm from Dursley and 5.25 pm return are "1 2 & govt".

== In operation ==
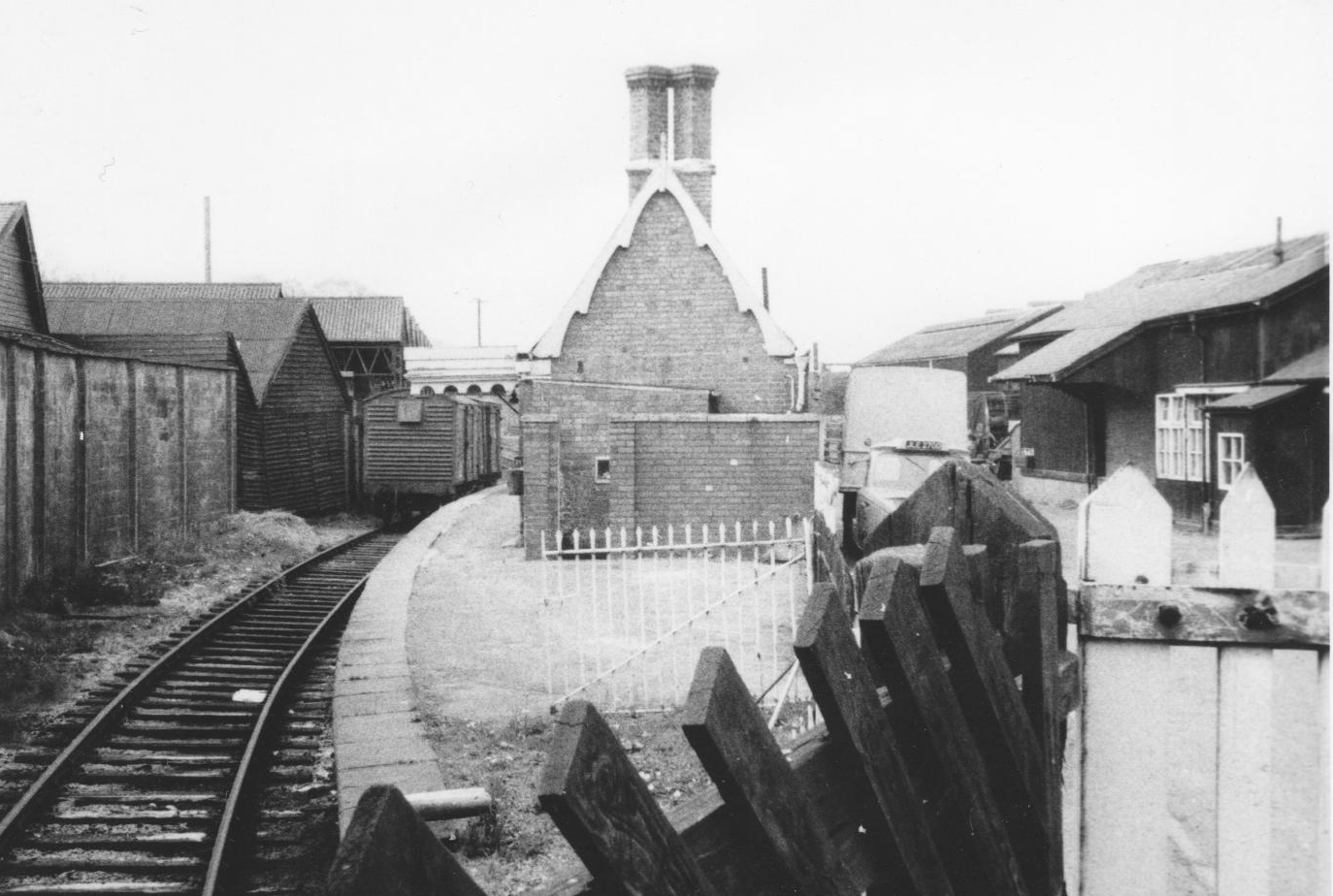
Dursley station in the late 1960s; Lister's factory is adjacent

The Midland Railway took over the maintenance of the permanent way on the expiry of the maintenance period of the construction contractor, on 1 August 1857.

The line was also worked by the Midland Railway, but it was loss-making from the outset, particularly because of the need to make heavy interest payments on debentures. The company was £1,000 in debt after a year. Fearing difficulty in avoiding bankruptcy, the company arranged to work the line itself from September 1857, using the construction contractor's 0-4-0T locomotive. They bought it for £434 10s and hired two Midland Railway four-wheel coaches, but they found that this hardly made any saving in outgoings. As early as September 1857 the suggestion was made that the company should sell its line to the Midland Railway, as the only way out of the financial difficulty.

In 1859 there were four return trips on the branch Mondays to Saturdays.

The matter was not immediately taken up, but at a meeting on 23 October 1860 the sale was agreed; the Midland Railway offered £10,500. This was accepted in principle, although the Company owed the Midland substantial sums of money, so that the net offered payment from the Midland was in fact £4,100. This arrangement was accepted by a special general meeting of the D&MJR shareholders on 21 May 1861. The matter needed authorisation via an act of Parliament, and this was obtained in the Midland Railway (Additional Powers) Act 1861 (24 & 25 Vict. c. cvi) on 28 June 1861. There were some adjustments to the purchase price, which had now risen to £10,750. The line had cost £15,765 to construct.

The branch line continued in use as a minor branch line of the Midland Railway. There were seven passenger train journeys each way Monday to Saturday in 1922. In the same year the Midland Railway was a constituent of the new London, Midland and Scottish Railway following the Railways Act 1921.

The very limited goods traffic originating on the line was enhanced by the development at Dursley station of the works of R A Lister and Company, manufacturers of agricultural machinery and later, internal combustion engines. There was a gas works at Cam, operated by the Dursley Gas Company from 1835, closing in 1948. In addition, there was a private siding for the large Cam Woollen Mill (closed 1959), and nearer the main line Daniels Mill (closed 1964) and Workman's Mill (closed 1959).

The development of road services for passengers and goods led to the inevitable decline of the branch line in the 1930s, and after nationalisation of the railways in 1948 the losses on the passenger business were considered to be unsupportable; the passenger service was discontinued on 10 September 1962. The line had been transferred to the Western Region of British Railways (from the London Midland Region) in 1957, resulting in a dramatic modernisation of the traction, as post-war pannier tanks took over from 19th century Midland Railway engine power. Goods trains continued running, chiefly in connection with Lister's business, but the branch was totally closed on 13 July 1970, the public goods service having been discontinued at Dursley on 28 June 1968.

When the branch closed to passengers in 1962, the junction station on the main line, Coaley, remained open for the time being, but it too closed in 1965.

For some time, there was no local passenger service on the main line at all, but in the 1990s certain stations were revived, and a new station, Cam and Dursley railway station, was opened a short distance north of the former Coaley, on 29 May 1994. It is still in use.

== Pedersen Way ==
In 2007 local resident Bob Littleford proposed converting the trackbed into a greenway. Despite significant sections of the route being encroached upon by development, the project is under construction and the open sections are known as the Pedersen Way.

== Topography ==
- Dursley; opened 17 September 1856; (Note: Quick refers to the opening date of Dursley Junction as 17 December 1856, but this must surely be a mistake.) closed 10 September 1962;
- Cam; opened 17 September 1856; closed 10 September 1962;
- Dursley Junction; opened 17 September 1856; renamed Coaley Junction in 1870; renamed Coaley in 1888; closed 4 January 1965.
