= Cam and Dursley railway station =

Railway station in Gloucestershire, England

Cam and Dursley
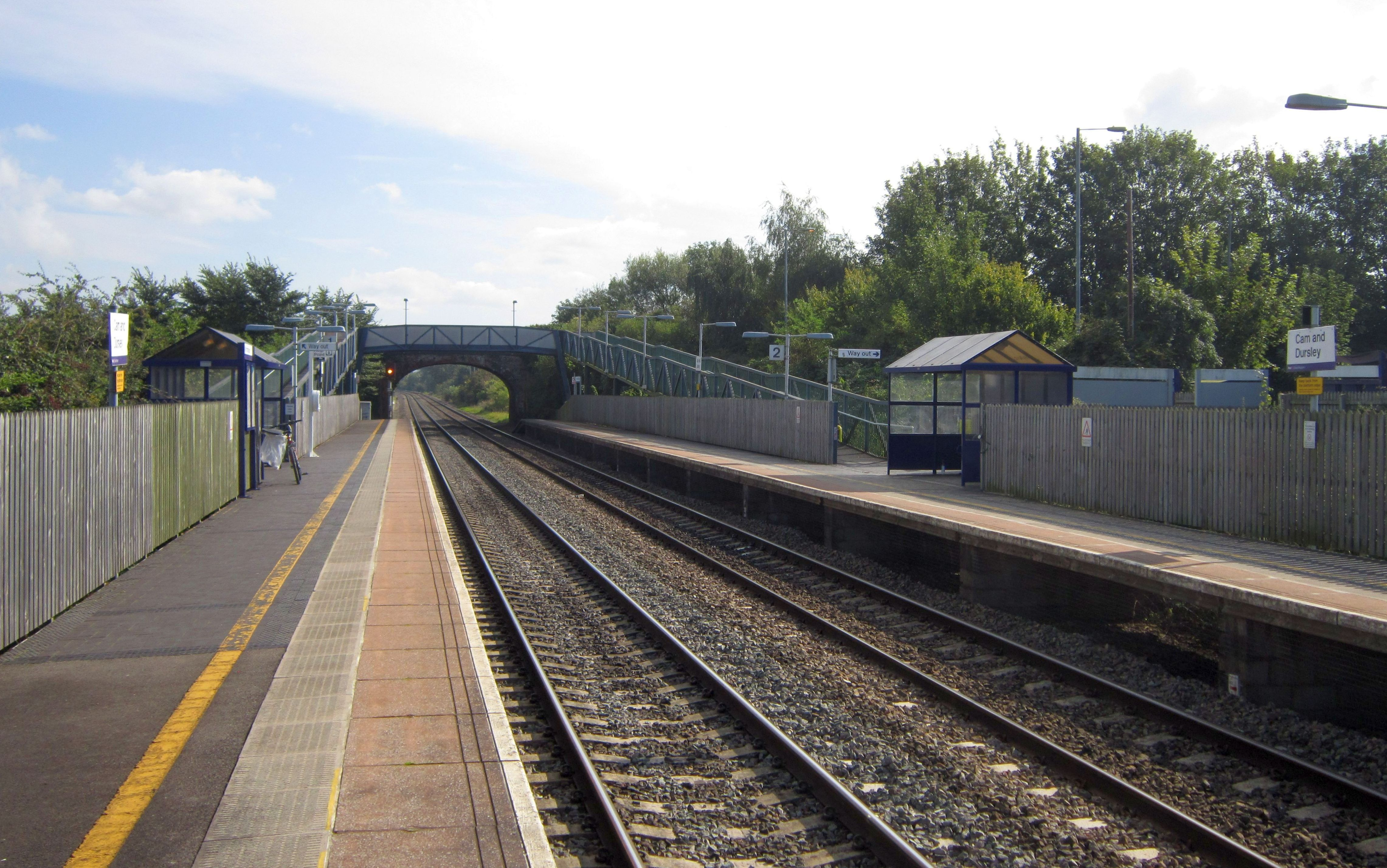

General information
- Location: Coaley, Stroud; England
- Coordinates: 51.718°N 2.359°W
- Grid reference: SO753021
- Managed by: Great Western Railway
- Platforms: 2

Other information
- Station code: CDU
- Classification: DfT category F2

History
- Original company: Railtrack

Key dates
- 14 May 1994: Opened for limited service
- 30 May 1994: Opened for full service

Passengers
- 2020/21: ▼42,818
- 2021/22: ▲0.132 million
- 2022/23: ▲0.183 million
- 2023/24: ▲0.208 million
- 2024/25: ▲0.239 million
Location
Notes
- Passenger statistics from the Office of Rail and Road

Cam and Dursley railway station is a railway station serving the large village of Cam and the market town of Dursley in Gloucestershire, England. It is located on the main Bristol-Birmingham line, between Yate and Gloucester, at a site close to where Coaley Junction railway station was situated from 1856 to 1965.

== History ==
Coaley Junction station was originally the junction for the short Dursley and Midland Junction Railway branch to Cam and Dursley. The station, first known as Dursley Junction, opened to passengers on 17 September 1856. The station had two short platforms on the main line with a very short and sharply curved platform on the branch. Goods facilities were limited, but included a brick goods shed (still in situ) with a crane. The signal box stood at the end of the platform between the branch and mainline.

The branch closed to passenger traffic on 10 September 1962, although the mainline platforms remained open for passengers until 4 January 1965.

Following a campaign for the reopening of Coaley Junction, the new station called Cam and Dursley opened on 14 May 1994, about 420 yards (380 m) north of the original site, although full opening did not occur until 30 May 1994. The new station is unstaffed, and consists of two platforms, linked by a footbridge, a car park covered by CCTV and a bus stop with shelter. Passenger facilities consist of shelters with seats on both platforms and a ticket machine, with passenger help points installed in late 2010.

Passenger services are provided by Great Western Railway on a largely hourly basis on the Bristol to Gloucester route. It is the nearest station to the town of Wotton-under-Edge, which is seven miles away.

Bus services, operated by Stagecoach West, run infrequently to the station as of timetable changes in August 2021. The 65 service runs 5 services, 3 in the morning, 2 in the evening to provide links to Gloucester, via Stonehouse and to Stroud, via Dursley and Uley.

Cam and Dursley Train Station, runs to a GWR timetable that links in with services towards Gloucester or towards Bristol.

There is a rail user group for the station, Coaley Junction Action Committee (CoJAC), which, following the opening of the new station, continues as a group to press for improvements in the service.

== Services ==
Great Western Railway's local services operate all services at this station. A new timetable was brought out on 10 December 2006 which saw the introduction of a mostly hourly "clockface" service, and a considerable increase in the number of trains calling, with northbound services (on Mondays to Fridays) increased from 11 to 15 and southbound services increased from 13 to 16. Northwards, services are to Gloucester with most services continuing on to Cheltenham Spa, Ashchurch for Tewkesbury and Worcester Foregate Street. One service a day also extends to Great Malvern. Southbound, services are to Bristol Temple Meads and onwards to Bath and Westbury, with some services carrying on to Weymouth.

An hourly service runs on Sundays between Bristol and Gloucester, with every other northbound service continuing on to Worcester Foregate Street.

Preceding station	National Rail	Following station
Yate	Great Western Railway; Great Malvern/Gloucester - Bristol/Westbury/South Coast	Gloucester
	Historical railways	
Stopping at Coaley Junction railway station
Berkeley Road; Line open, station closed	Bristol and Gloucester Railway; Midland Railway	Frocester; Line open, station closed
Berkeley Road; Line open, station closed	Sharpness Branch Line; Midland Railway	Terminus
	Disused railways	
Cam; Line and station closed	Dursley and Midland Junction Railway; Midland Railway	Terminus

== Bibliography ==
- Quick, Michael (2023). Railway Passenger Stations in Great Britain: A Chronology (PDF) (5th ed.). London: Railway and Canal Historical Society.
