= Rednock School =

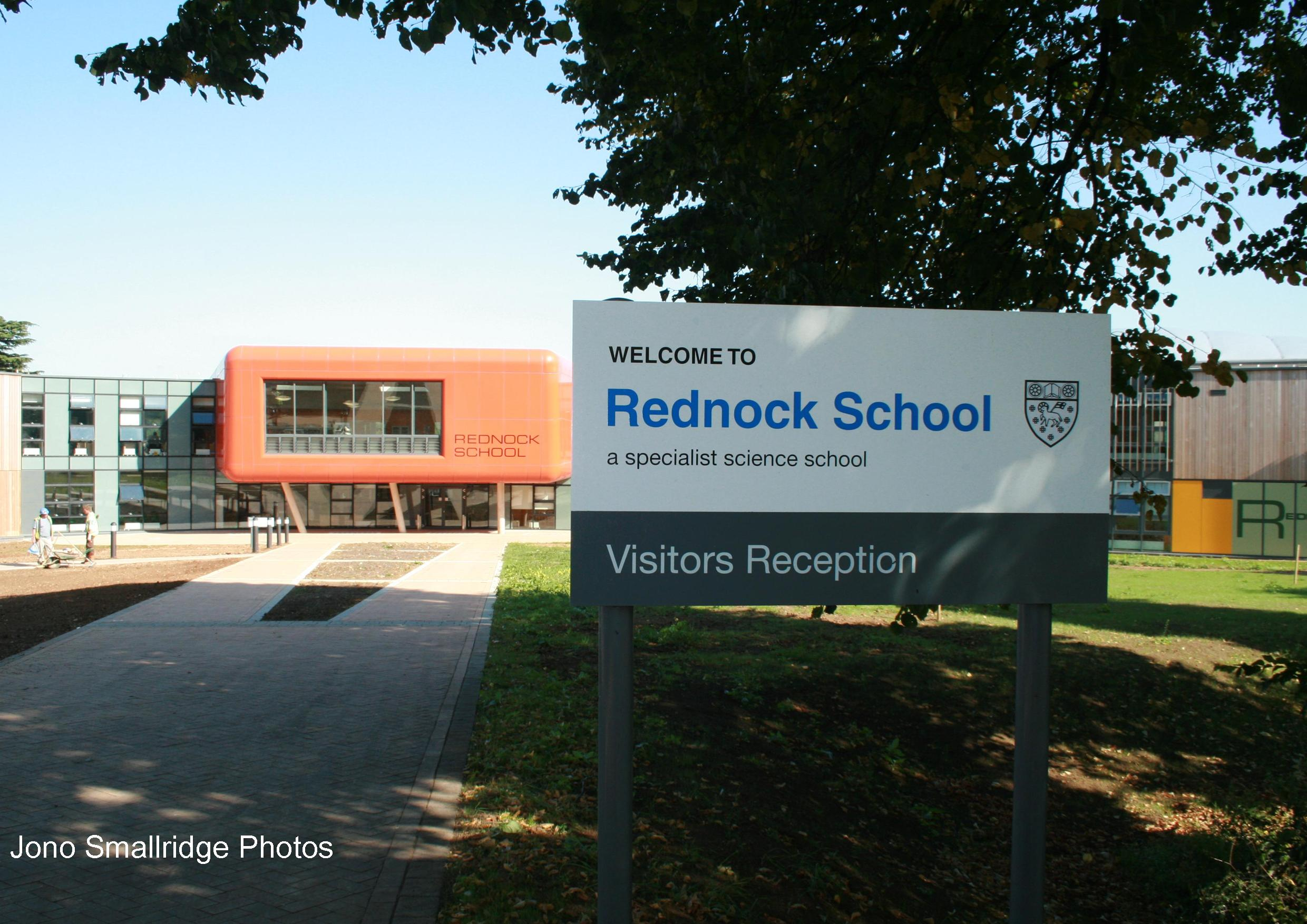
- Rednock School

Location
- Dursley, Gloucestershire, GL11 4BY; England; 51°41′12″N 2°21′24″W

Information
- Type: Foundation School
- Established: 1971
- Local authority: Gloucestershire
- Department for Education URN: 115758 Tables
- Ofsted: Reports
- Headteacher: Mike Stratford
- Gender: Coeducational
- Age: 11 to 18
- Enrolment: 1,390 as of October 2024
- Communities served: Brunel, Jenner, Hubble, Darwin
- Website: http://www.rednockschool.org.uk

Rednock School is a comprehensive school located in Dursley, Gloucestershire, England. It is a specialist Science College which also contains a sixth form. It is made up of a main three-story building, a large AstroTurf pitch, an outside area, and a music block.

== History ==
The school opened in 1971 as a comprehensive school, having formerly served as the grammar school in the town of Dursley.

In 2009, the school underwent a complete re-build which saw a £38 million investment into developing an entirely new school site. It has many eco-friendly features such as a sedum roof and solar panels and was also shortlisted for the South West Built Environment Awards. To celebrate the development of the newly built school, a book compiling details of the history of Rednock School was produced for the pupils.

The school has its first student attain a place on the Prime Minister's Global Fellowship programme in 2009.

Since 2023, Rednock has had a headteacher named Mike Stratford.

== Gallery ==
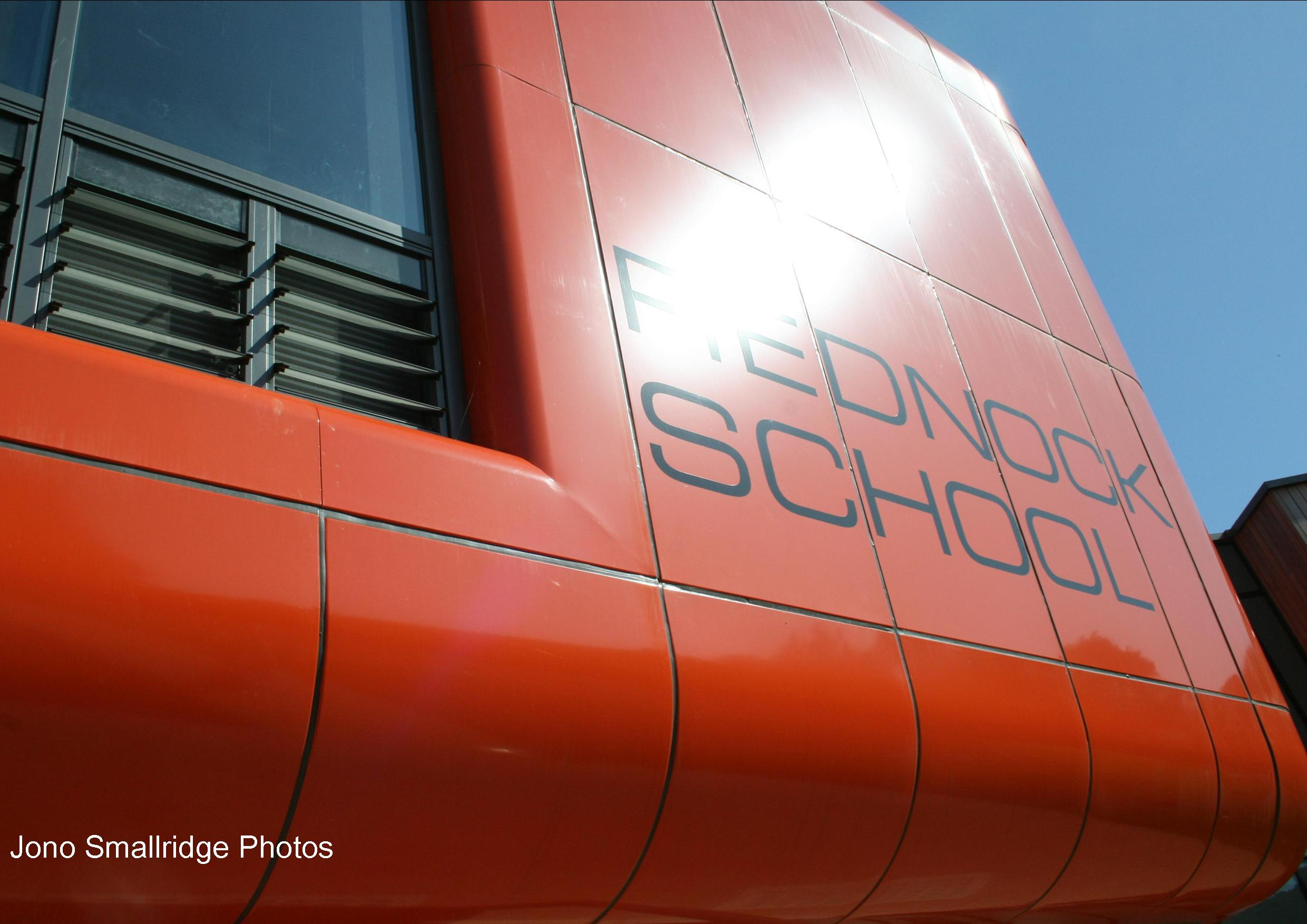

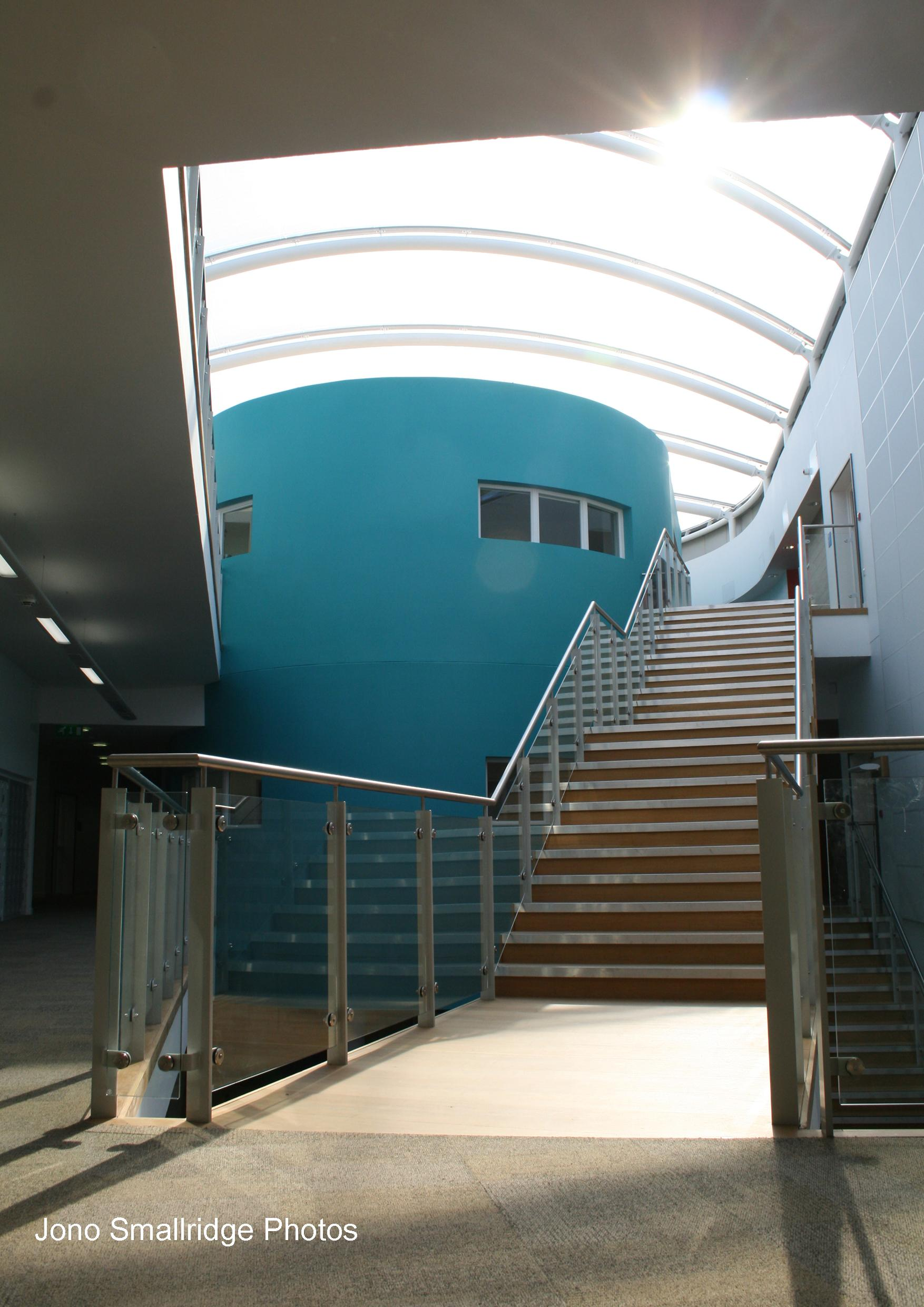

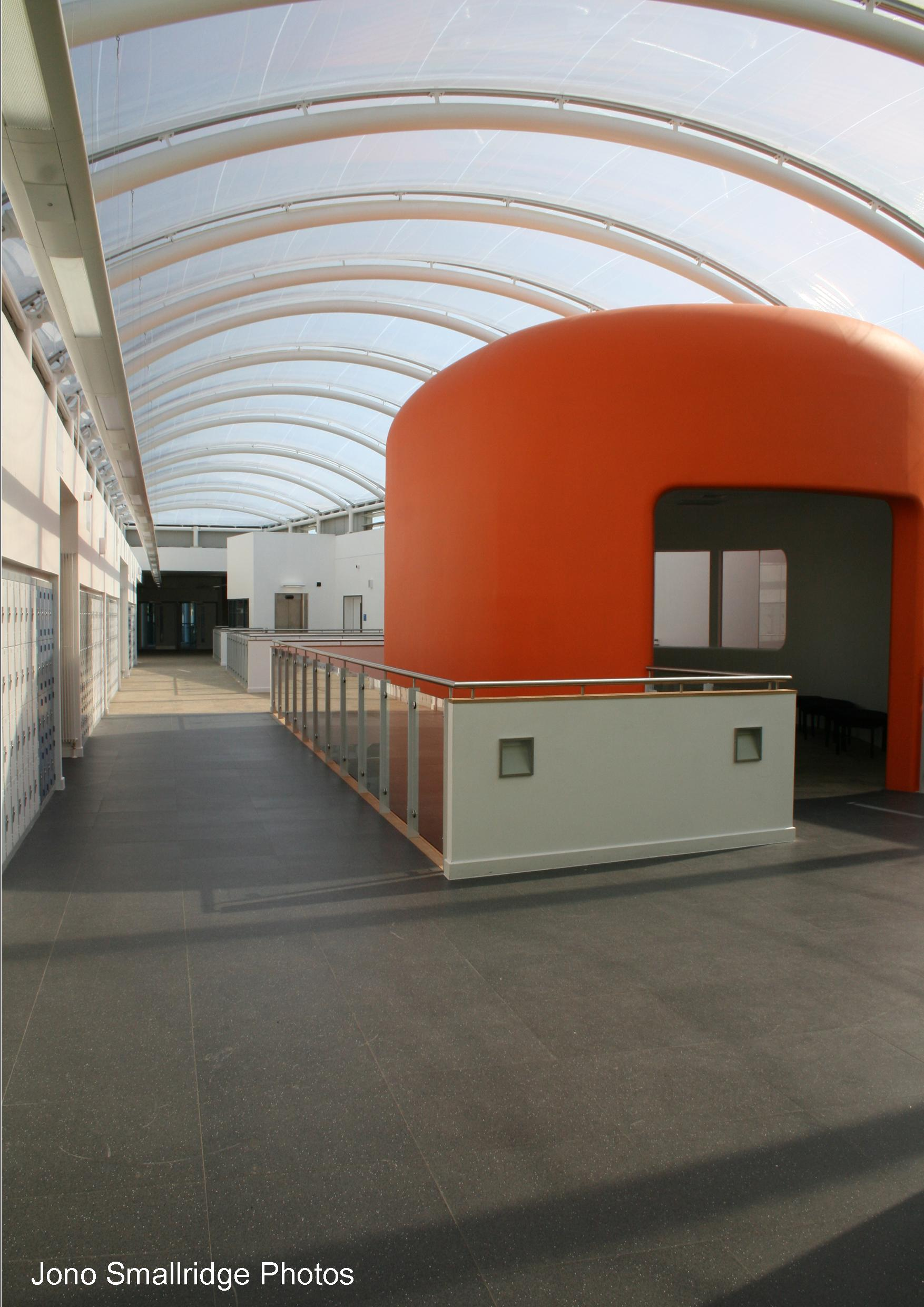
