= Cam, Gloucestershire =

Village in Gloucestershire, England

Coordinates: 51°42′04″N 2°21′51″W

Cam
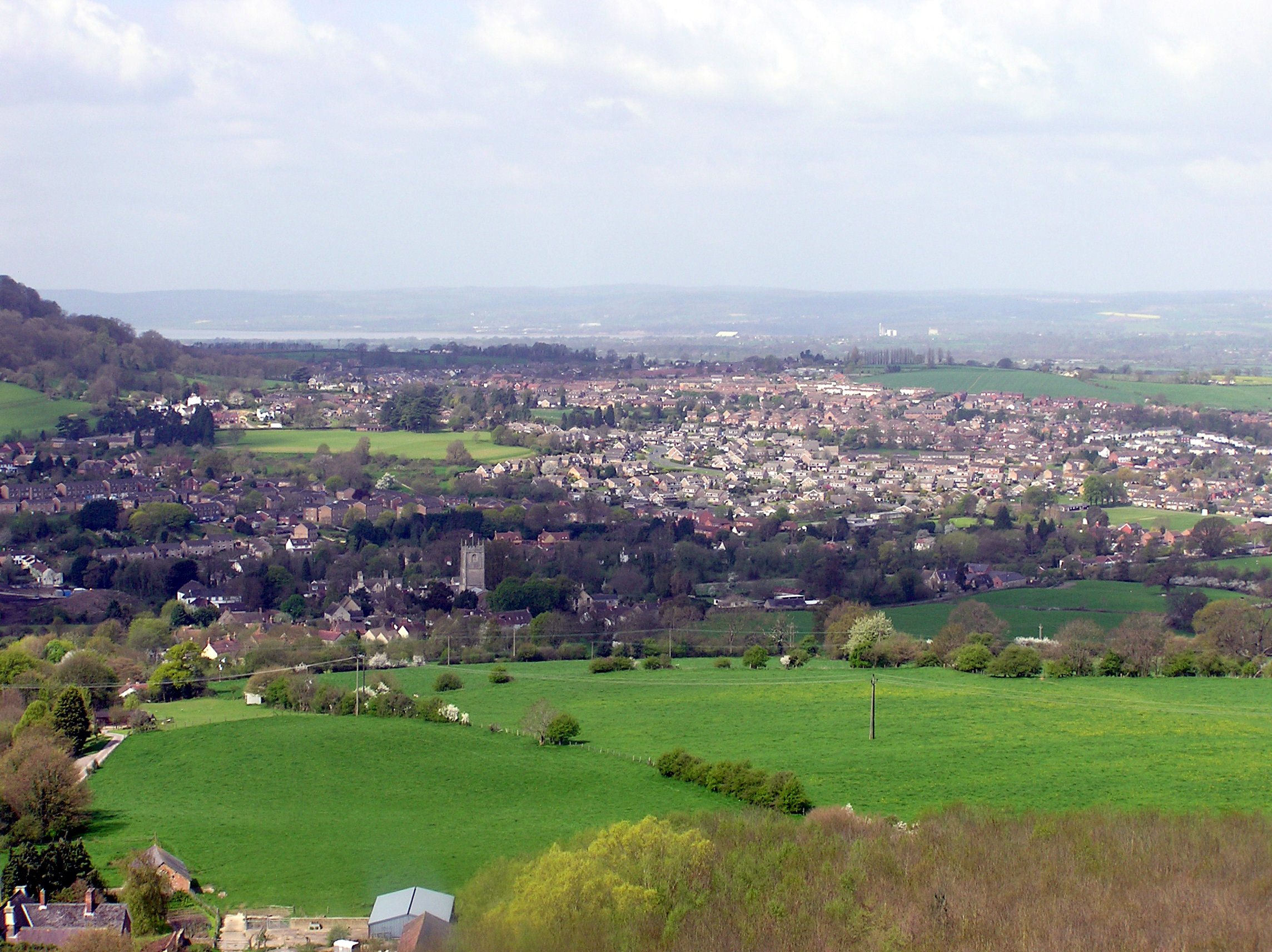
- Cam from Cam Peak

- Location within Gloucestershire
- Population: 8,520 (2021 Census)
- OS grid reference: ST7499
- Civil parish: Cam
- District: Stroud
- Shire county: Gloucestershire
- Region: South West
- Country: England
- Sovereign state: United Kingdom
- Post town: Dursley
- Postcode district: GL11
- Dialling code: 01453
- Police: Gloucestershire
- Fire: Gloucestershire
- Ambulance: South Western
- UK Parliament: Stroud

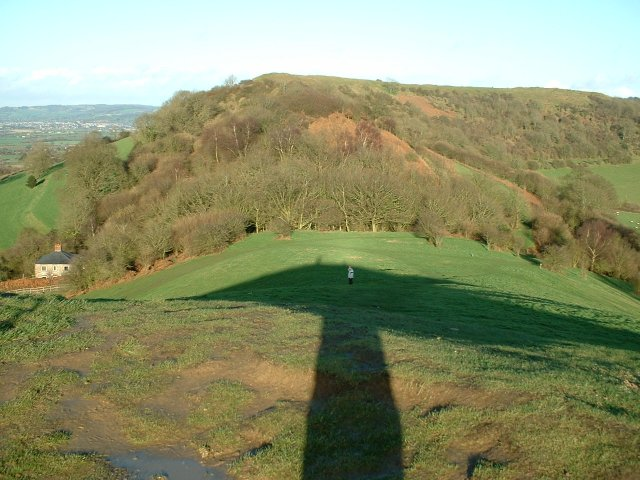
The view from Cam Peak, looking towards Cam Long Down

Cam is a large village and civil parish in Gloucestershire, England, situated on the edge of the Cotswolds and contiguous with the town of Dursley, north of Bristol and south of Gloucester. The Cotswold Way runs less than a mile from the village.

Cam had 8,160 residents with 3,575 households in the 2011 census. Its population is actually larger than neighbouring Dursley, which is a town. The population is planned to grow, with new developments near the railway station increasing the number of households by about 12%.

== Facilities ==
The village has an identifiable centre, with several shops including a pharmacy, a florist, a hardware store and funeral directors, three takeaways, a restaurant, a beauty salon, a combined Post Office and card shop, parish council offices, two pubs including the Berkeley Arms and The Railway Inn and a supermarket clustered loosely around St Bartholemew's Church. South of the village centre sits the medieval Grade I listed Parish Church of St George opposite the Cam Congregational Church.

Cam supports three state sector primary schools located in the Woodfields, Hopton and Everlands districts of the village. The nearest mainstream secondary school is Rednock, just across the parish boundary in Dursley. A community hub called GL11 is named after the post code.

== Leisure ==
Cam Bulldogs FC is Cam's football team and plays in the Gloucestershire Northern Senior League Division One. The cricket team is called Cam Cricket Club. Both play at Cam Sports Club, Everlands, which was established In 1923 by the owner of Cam Mills and now run and managed by Cam Sports Club, a registered charity.The facilities include the home of Cam & Dursley tennis club and offers Pickleball for the area.

There are three public play areas; Woodfield, Cam Green and Jubilee Fields with well maintained play equipment, including swings, carousels, seesaw, spring rockers, skateboard park, gyro spiral, climbers, climbing wall, slides, fitness equipment, basketball courts and football fields. Some of the facilities are on all weather surfaces. Disabled access and some equipment for disabled use.

There is a swimming pool, library, indoor gyms, running clubs, and cycle clubs in nearby Dursley.

== Future development ==
The council's development strategy for the period to 2031 is contained in the 2015 Stroud District Local Plan, locally known as the Box Road Developments. This plan has been under construction since 2016, when construction began on Brunel Road. This designates a 29.1 hectare site on the North-East edge of the village for a strategic development, to feature:

- 450 new dwellings (including 135 affordable dwellings).
- 11.4 hectares of new B1, B2 and B8 employment land, forecast to attract up to 1500 new jobs.
- A new landscaped linear park extending along the riverside
- A new lit cycle and footpath running through the site to link the village to Cam and Dursley railway station

== Employment ==
One of the main employers in Cam is Cam Mills, which has just under 100 employees. It is the only remaining woollen mill in an area that had many and has been manufacturing cloth, now mainly for tennis balls, for over 200 years.

== Notable residents ==
The artist Alan Lowndes lived in Upper Cam from 1970 until his death in 1978.

Peter Currell Brown, author of Smallcreep's Day, lived in Cam and Dursley while working at Lister's. In later life he devoted himself to pottery and set up the Snake Pottery in Cam Green. His pots, often inscribed PCB Cam Glos are now collector's items

The librarian Falconer Madan was born in Cam

== See also ==
- Cam and Dursley railway station
