= River Cam, Gloucestershire =

River in Gloucestershire, England

River Cam
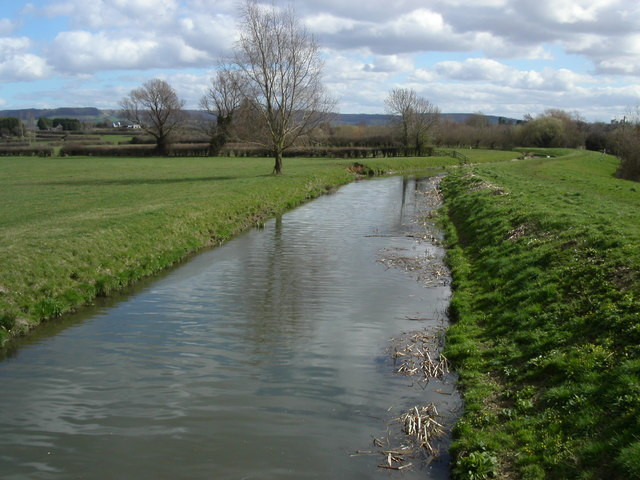
- The River Cam near Cambridge (Gloucestershire)

- Location within Gloucestershire

Location
- Country: England
- Counties: Gloucestershire

Physical characteristics
- Mouth
  - location: Gloucester and Sharpness Canal
  - coordinates: 51.7438°N 2.38°W
- Discharge
  - location: Cambridge

Basin features
- Tributaries
  - right: Wickster's Brook

The River Cam is a small river in Gloucestershire, England. It flows for 12 miles (20 km) north-westwards from the Cotswold Edge, across the Vale of Berkeley, into the Gloucester and Sharpness Canal.

The river rises on the Cotswold escarpment above the village of Uley, and flows through Dursley, Cam and Cambridge to the Gloucester and Sharpness Canal as a feeder to that waterway.

Before the canal was opened in 1827, the Cam flowed into the River Severn at Frampton Pill, Frampton on Severn.

The lower river was improved for navigation when the canal was built, and became known as the Cambridge Arm with one entrance lock leading to a basin and wharf at Cambridge, the limit of navigation due to mill weirs and low bridges on the Bristol to Gloucester road. The lock was missing and the basin abandoned by 1901. Most of the straightened channel has survived as flood defence improvements and is potentially still navigable, but the entrance is now blocked by a very low bridge at the site of the former lock. It is thought that the legal right to navigation may still be in force, which is potentially relevant for recreational canoeing, kayaking and stand-up paddleboarding users to enjoy unimpeded access.

Upstream from the town of Dursley, the river is known as the River Ewelme.

A new fish and eel pass and an additional second channel were dug by the Environment Agency just east of Cambridge in 2014. This drew criticism from local people as no money had been spent on flood defences.
