= Slimbridge =

Village in Gloucestershire, England

Coordinates: 51.728°N 02.378°W

- Parish church of St John the Evangelist

- Location within Gloucestershire
- Population: 1,136 (2011, including Cambridge)
- OS grid reference: SO740035
- Civil parish: Slimbridge
- District: Stroud
- Shire county: Gloucestershire
- Region: South West
- Country: England
- Sovereign state: United Kingdom
- Post town: GLOUCESTER
- Postcode district: GL2
- Dialling code: 01453
- Police: Gloucestershire
- Fire: Gloucestershire
- Ambulance: South Western
- UK Parliament: Stroud

Slimbridge is a village and civil parish near Dursley in Gloucestershire, England.

It is best known as the home of the Wildfowl and Wetlands Trust's Slimbridge Reserve which was started by Sir Peter Scott in 1946.

== Canal and Patch Bridge ==
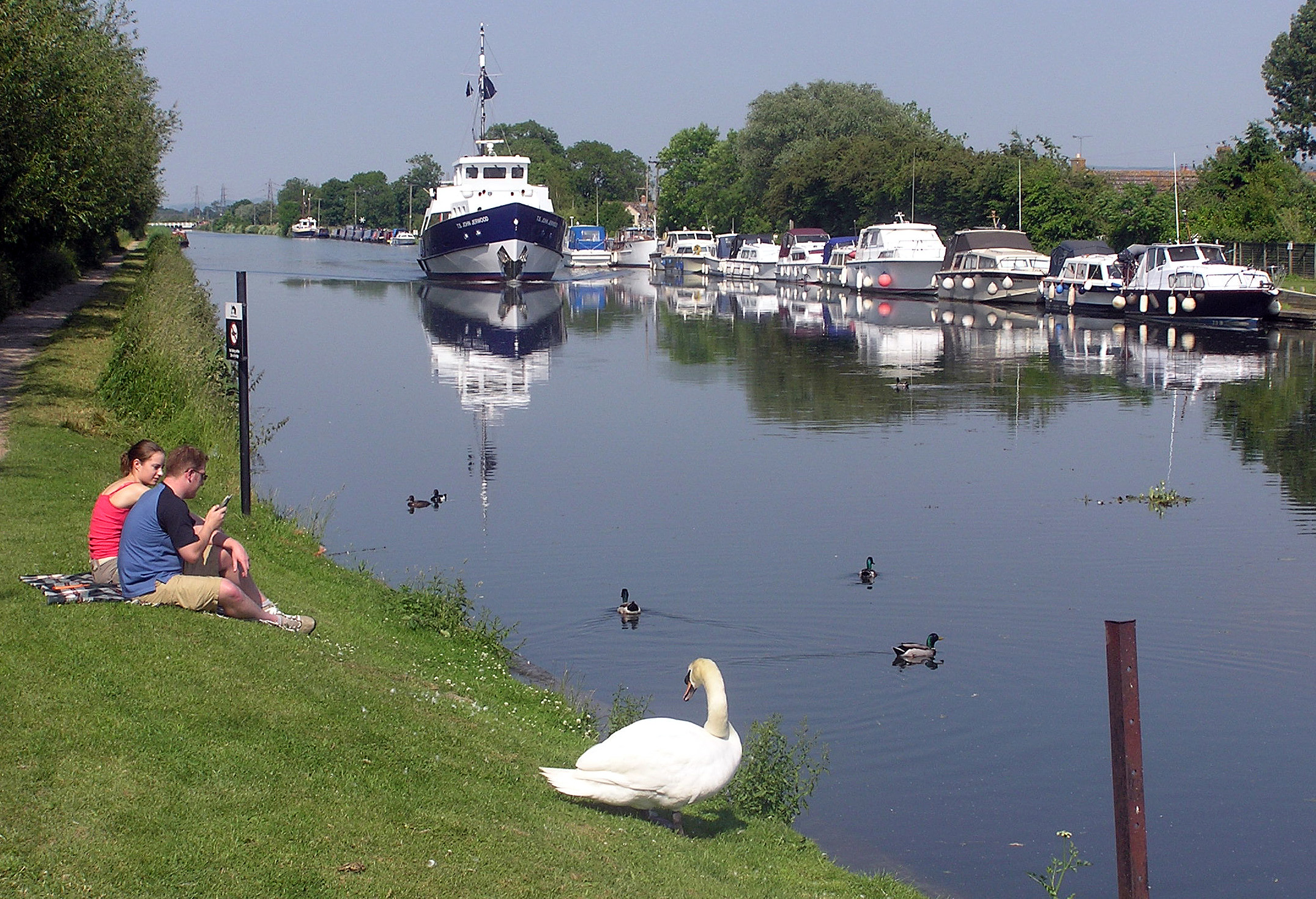
The canal at Patch Bridge, near the Wildfowl Reserve

The Gloucester and Sharpness Canal runs through the village, and under Patch Bridge which must be crossed to reach the Wildfowl Trust. Damage to the decking of Patch Bridge in October 2007 resulted in a temporary repair being made using steel plates. This had the effect of unbalancing the bridge, which warped and jammed on 23 October 2007. The swing bridge was replaced in early 2009. Nearby there is a caravan park and pub. The name of the bridge is echoed by the locals abandoning the "Tudor Arms" name and merely referring to the pub as "The Patch". On the canal towpath, next the bridge, is the Slimbridge Boat Station, which is a cafe, general store and boating resource centre.

== Church ==
The village church of St John the Evangelist dates from the early 13th century and is a Grade I listed building.

== School and playing field ==
Slimbridge is home to one primary school that takes pupils from Slimbridge and the surrounding village of Cambridge, Gloucestershire. The school is fairly small consisting of only 4 classes and around 100 pupils. There is also a recreational field in Slimbridge that the Playing Field Committee raised money for, through the aid of National Lottery funding, to build a brand new pavilion.

== Slimbridge estate ==
The 2,480-acre (10.0 km^{2}) Slimbridge Estate is owned by the Ernest Cook Trust based on an original purchase in 1945 by Ernest Cook of 1,109 acres (4.49 km^{2}) in the parishes of Slimbridge and Gossington out of the sale of outlying portions of the Berkeley Castle Estate. The Berkeley Estate had for years been a famous sporting estate although the last Earl of Berkeley, who died young, was more interested in the sciences. Ernest Cook extended the estate by purchasing Breadstone Farm and Wanswell Court from the Berkeley family.

== Sport and leisure ==
The village's football club, Slimbridge F.C., play in the Southern Football League South & West Division as well as competing in the FA Cup and FA Trophy. "The Swans" or "The Bridge" play their home matches at their ground located in Wisloe Road, Cambridge, just across the A38 from Slimbridge village. In the Summer of 2016, the club's Wisloe Road Ground was renamed 'Thornhill Park' in memory of former Chairman Evi Thornhill, who donated the field that the club has built on in his will when he died in 1960.

The village also has a cricket club which operates in the Stroud District Cricket League.

Slimbridge Local History Society holds regular meetings featuring presentations of local history and maintains online archives for members' use.

== International relations ==
Slimbridge is twinned with the 14 communes of the former canton of Saint-Georges-du-Vièvre (Normandy, France), the most populated of which is Lieurey.
