= Dursley =

Market town in Gloucestershire, England

Coordinates: 51°40′52″N 2°21′14″W

- Market town
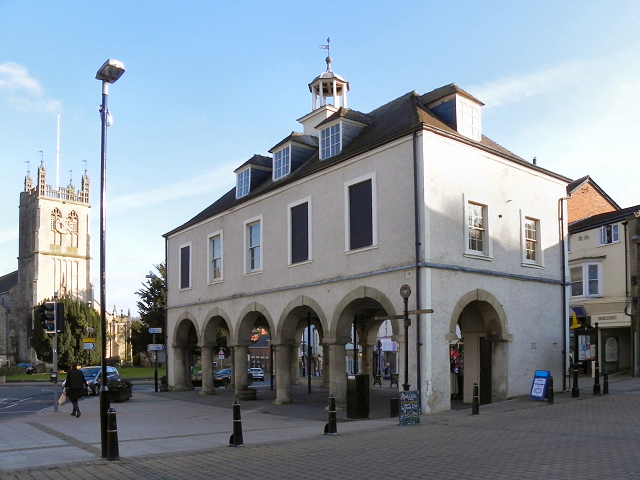
- Dursley Town Hall and St James the Great parish church

- Location within Gloucestershire
- Population: 7,463 (2021 Census)
- OS grid reference: ST756981
- Civil parish: Dursley
- District: Stroud
- Shire county: Gloucestershire
- Region: South West
- Country: England
- Sovereign state: United Kingdom
- Post town: DURSLEY
- Postcode district: GL11
- Dialling code: 01453
- Police: Gloucestershire
- Fire: Gloucestershire
- Ambulance: South Western
- UK Parliament: Stroud

Dursley is a market town and civil parish in the Stroud District of Gloucestershire, England. It lies between the cities of Bristol and Gloucester. It is under the northeast flank of Stinchcombe Hill, and about 4 miles (6 km) southeast of the River Severn. The town is adjacent to the village of Cam. The population of Dursley was 7,463 at the 2021 Census.

== History ==
The name Dursley derives from the Old English deorsigeslēah meaning 'Deorsige's wood or clearing'.

Ancient historical sites in the vicinity give evidence of earlier occupation. Uley Bury is an Iron Age hill fort dating from around 300 BC. The area also has neolithic long barrows; one called "Hetty Pegler's Tump" can be entered. Roman remains exist at Frocester, West Hill near Uley, Woodchester and Calcot Manor.

Dursley once had a castle, built by Roger de Berkeley in 1153.

Dursley gained borough status in 1471 and lost it in 1886. From 1837 to 1851, it was the administrative centre of Dursley Registration District which recorded vital records of people living in the parishes of North Nibley, Coaley, Slimbridge, Stinchcombe, Uley, Dursley, Cam, Nympsfield, Kingswood, Wotton-under-Edge and Owlpen. From 1886 until 1974 it was the administrative centre of Dursley Rural District (RDC). In 1974 the RDC became part of Stroud District.

The Grade I listed parish church of St. James the Great dates from the 13th century. The modern building is largely of 14th and 15th century construction and carries the Tudor coat of arms on the outside below the guttering, indicating that some of its construction was funded by the Tudor royals. The original church spire collapsed in January 1699 during a bell-ringing session, causing casualties. The current belltower, in an imposing Gothic survival style, was built by Thomas Sumsion of Colerne in 1708–09.

Dursley Town Hall, a structure complete with statue of Queen Anne and bell turret, dates from 1738, when the town's markets attracted farmers and traders from miles around. It is now maintained by the Dursley Town Council.

In 1856, a short branch line railway opened, called the "Dursley Donkey" by locals, linking Dursley and Cam to the Bristol–Gloucester main line at Coaley Junction. The branch line was closed in 1968 and Coaley Junction station was also closed at about this time. However, in 1994, a new station called Cam and Dursley was opened on the main line, 330 yards north of the site of Coaley Junction.

In the 19th and 20th centuries, Dursley was a large-scale manufacturing town; engines built here by the Lister engine company founded in 1867 were used around the world.

That company's successor, Lister Petter, was based in the town until 2014, though much of the original 92-acre (37 ha) factory site was acquired in 2000 by the South West Regional Development Agency and then in 2011 by Stroud District Council. It is now being developed as a large housing development with some industrial units. The Towers, a large gothic-style house, formerly part of the Lister Petter estate, still overlooks the town and has been converted into flats and a residential care home. The Lister Hall theatre is named after the company.

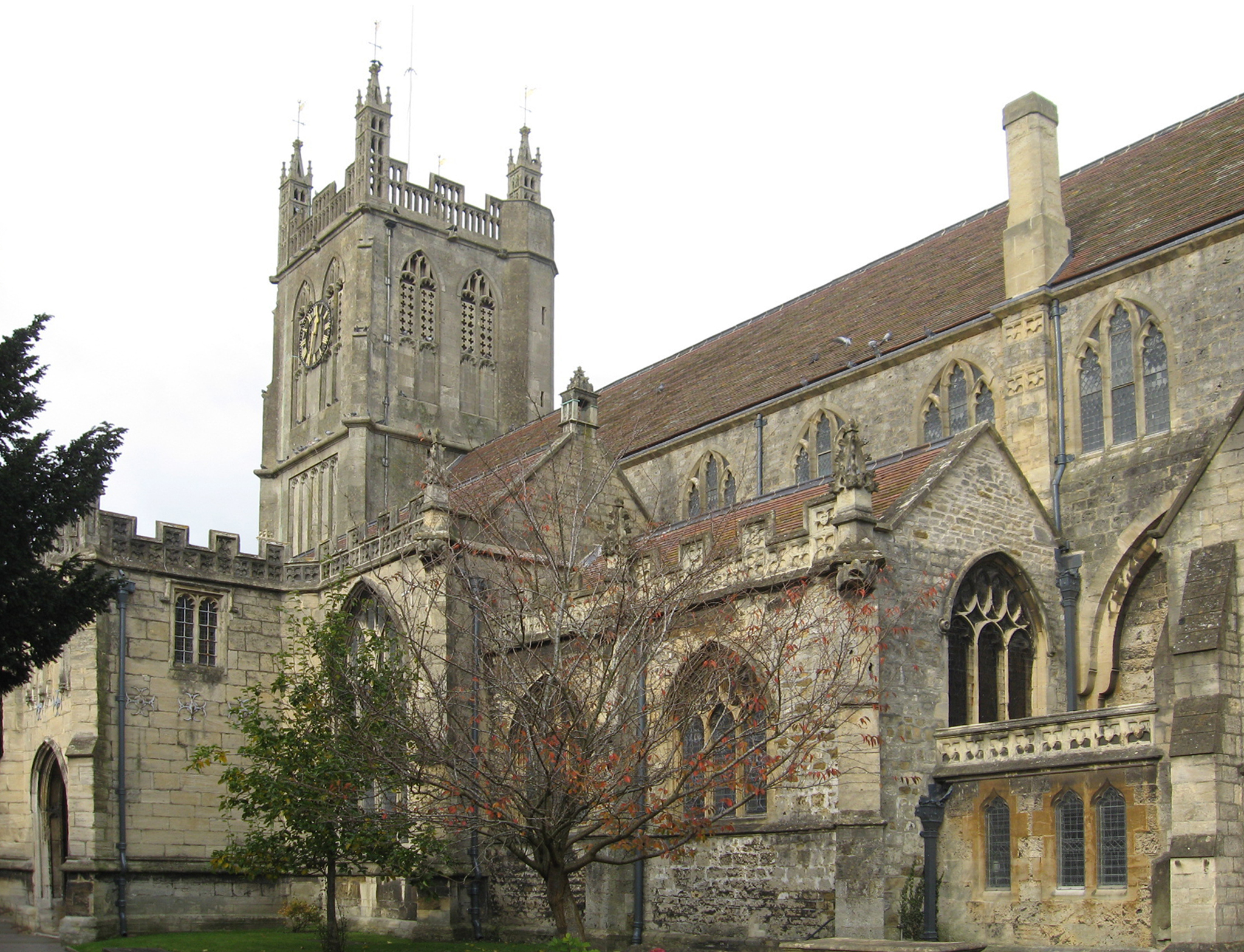
Church of St James the Great

Other large factories based in the town included Mawdsley's, an electrical equipment manufacturer; Bymack's, an upholsterers; and the Bailey Newspaper Group, a newspaper printer, all of which have reduced or closed operations.

== Character and amenities ==
The town sits on the edge of the Cotswolds escarpment where it drops off towards the Severn Vale and the River Severn.

Dursley's main watercourse is the River Ewelme which becomes the River Cam when it enters Cam. The town is surrounded by woodland and countryside, and the Cotswold Way long distance trail passes through Dursley town centre.

In March 2010, Sainsbury's opened a newly built 20,000 sq ft supermarket within walking distance of the town centre. Other recent arrivals include Lidl (November 2009, in premises on Kingshill Road previously occupied by the Regal Cinema and then Somerfield) and Iceland (July 2010, replacing Somerfield in the town centre). The Co-op has operated a smaller store in Rosebery Road since 2002. The town centre also has a number of independent shops and cafes.

A range of markets are held at the Market Place in the centre of the town; a farmers' market is held there on the second Saturday of every month and a craft market on the fourth Saturday of each month. There is an active Transition group in Cam and Dursley (part of the global Transition town network) which looks after Dursley's Secret Garden, among other projects.

Dursley has a number of licensed premises and the Old Spot pub is regularly voted Gloucestershire 'Pub of the Year'. The pub was named as 2007 CAMRA National Pub of the year.

== Demographics ==
According to the 2021 census, the population ethnicity breakdown is as follows:

- White: 7,197 people (96.4%)
- Mixed: 135 people (1.8%)
- Asian: 79 people (1.1%)
- Black: 28 people (0.4%)
- Other 23 people (0.3%)

The same 2021 census gave the following religious breakdown:

- No religion: 3,419 people (45.8%)
- Christian: 3,393 people (45.5%)
- Hindu: 22 people (0.3%)
- Muslim: 22 people (0.3%)
- Buddhist: 16 people (0.2%)
- Sikh: 9 people (0.1%)
- Jewish: 4 people (<0.1%)
- Other religion: 53 people (0.7%)

== Railways ==
The nearest railway station is at Cam and Dursley on the Bristol and Gloucester Railway, with trains operated by Great Western Railway.

== Notable residents ==
- William Tyndale (ca.1494 – ca.1536) an English biblical scholar, linguist and martyr; probably born at Slimbridge.
- Edward Foxe (ca.1496 – 1538) an English churchman, Bishop of Hereford; he played a major role in Henry VIII's divorce from Catherine of Aragon.
- John Tippetts (1622–1692), Surveyor of the Navy, born and raised in Dursley.
- William Vizard (1774–1859) an English lawyer, known for his role in the 1820 trial of Queen Caroline
- Mikael Pedersen (1855–1929), a Danish inventor invented the Pedersen bicycle in Dursley in the 19th century.
- Peter Currell Brown (born 1936) writer, wrote the cult classic surrealist novel Smallcreep's Day in Dursley.
- Nicholas Wapshott (born 1952), journalist, broadcaster and author.

=== Sport ===
- Arthur Winterbotham (1864–1936) an English first-class cricketer
- Henry Witchell (1906–1965) an English first-class cricketer
- David Bruton (born 1952) a former footballer, with over 290 appearances mainly with Swansea City A.F.C.
- Max Hall (born 2007), racing driver

== Popular culture ==
Author J. K. Rowling, born in nearby Yate, named the Dursley family in the Harry Potter books after the town due to disliking the place. She has jokingly remarked, "I don't imagine I'm very popular in Dursley".

In Richard II there is reference to "the wolds of Gloucestershire", and when Bolingbrook asks how far it is to Berkeley as "these wild hills and rough uneven ways draw out for miles", the reply given is "there stands the castle beyond that tuft of trees". Many people understand this as a conversation taking place on Stinchcombe Hill overlooking the Vale of Berkeley and its castle.

== See also ==
- Vale Community Hospital
