= Lister =

Lister or Lyster may refer to:

== People ==
- Joseph Lister, pioneer of antiseptic surgery
- Lister (surname), including a list of people named Lister or Lyster
- Lister (given name), a liste of people named Lister or Lyster

== Places ==
- Lister, British Columbia, Canada, a small community
- Lyster, Quebec, Canada, a municipality
- Lyster Lake (Estrie, Canada), Estrie, Quebec, Canada
- Lister Region, in Agder county, Norway
- Lista (peninsula) (historically spelled Lister), in Agder county, Norway
- Luster Municipality, formerly spelled Lyster, a municipality in Vestland county, Norway
- Lister Hundred, part of Blekinge in Sweden
- Lister Park, a public park in Bradford, West Yorkshire, England
- Lister (river), North Rhine-Westphalia, Germany
- Mount Lister, Victoria Land, Antarctica

== Businesses ==
- Lister Motor Company, a British sports car manufacturer
- Lister Mills, a large former silk factory and landmark in the Manningham district of Bradford, West Yorkshire, England
- Lister Petter, manufacturer of industrial internal combustion engines in Gloucestershire, England
- R A Lister and Company, an engineering company in Gloucestershire, England, merged with Petters Limited to become Lister Petter

== Medicine ==
- Lister Hospital (disambiguation)
- Lister Institute of Preventive Medicine, a British research institution
- Lister Medal, awarded by the Royal College of Surgeons of England for contributions to surgical science

== Other uses ==
- Lister Community School, east London, England
- Lister Housing Co-operative, Edinburgh, Scotland
- Lister (newspaper), a late 19th century Norwegian newspaper
- Dave Lister, commonly referred to simply as Lister, a main character from the television show Red Dwarf
- Lister, title of a town tax appraiser (see tax assessment) in Vermont
- Lister v Romford Ice and Cold Storage Co Ltd
- Lister D, a stationary engine on petrol or petrol/paraffin (fuel) built between 1926 and 1965
- Corn lister, a type of planter (farm implement) no longer widely used
- Listers: A Glimpse Into Extreme Birdwatching, a 2025 birding documentary
