= Monowheel tractor =

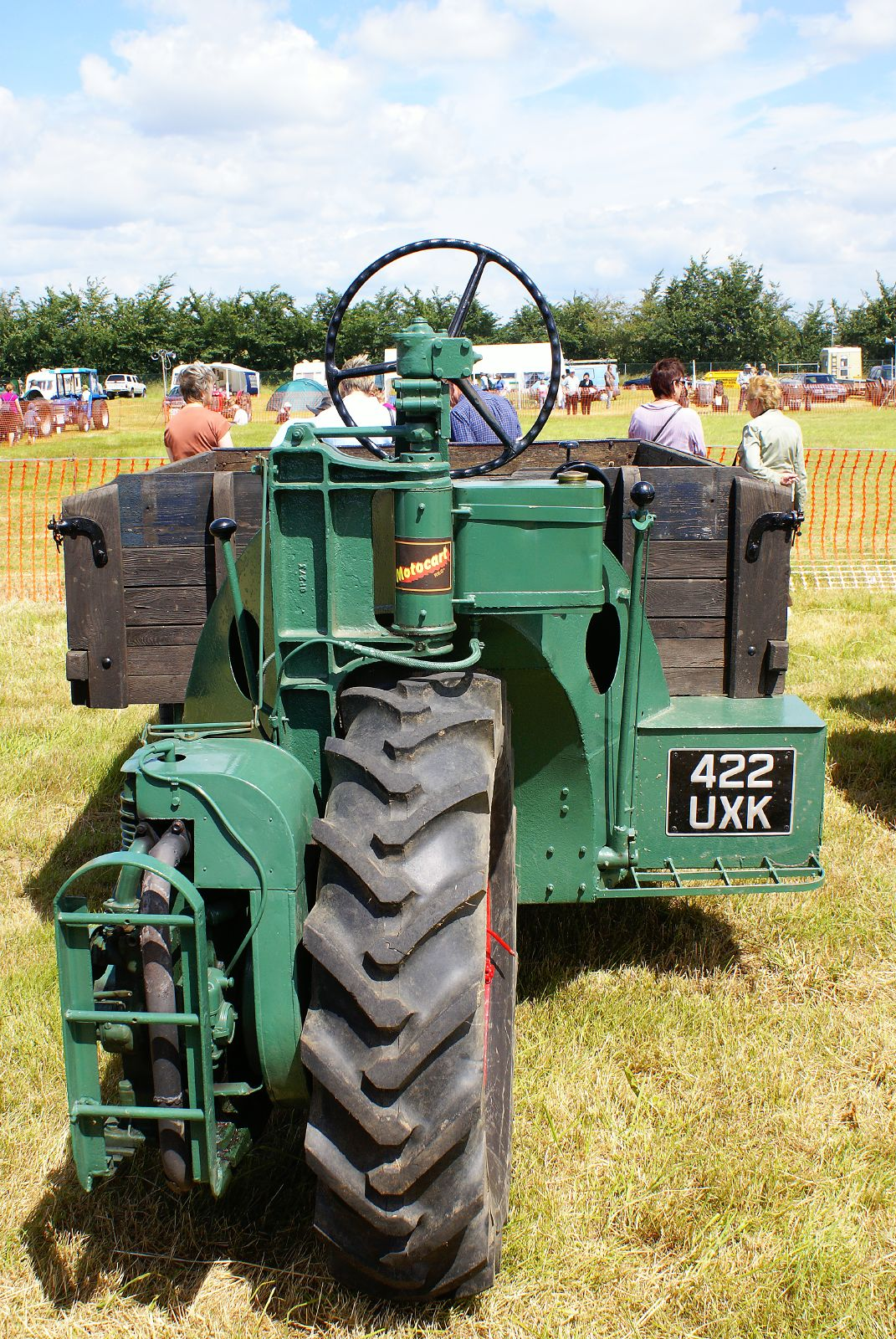
Opperman Motocart

A monowheel tractor or monowheel-drive tractor is a light transport and agricultural vehicle that is driven and controlled by an engine and steering mechanism mounted on a single large wheel, with the load-carrying body trailing behind. Despite the name, they are tricycles.

== Development ==
Monowheel tractors developed in two periods, both during times of rapid upheaval after warfare. Both types had quite different circumstances and goals. Small wheel tractors appeared after World War I, during a time of new opportunity. Large-wheel tractors appeared after World War II, during a period of austerity.

=== Small wheel tractors ===
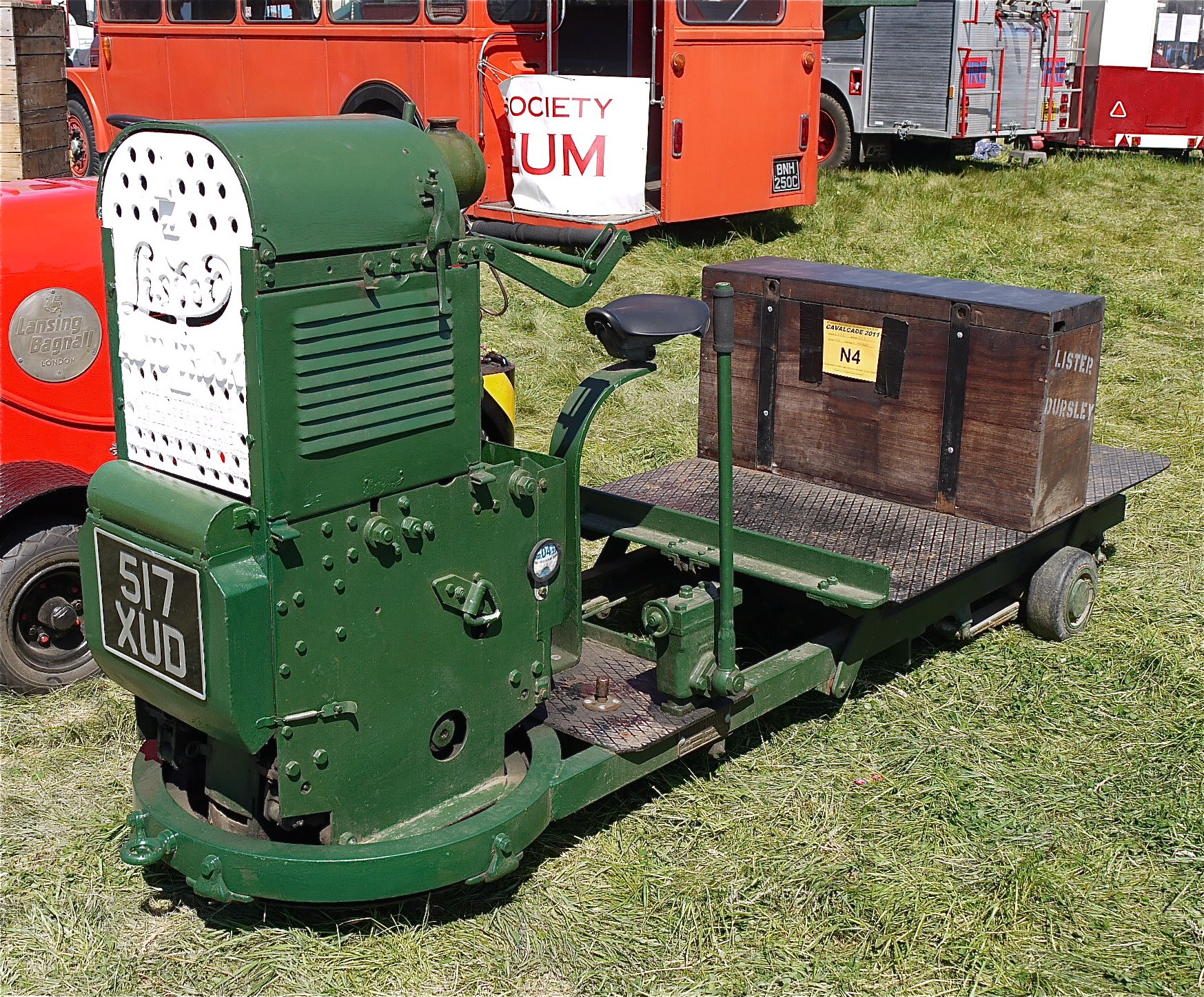
Lister Auto-Truck

The first monowheel tractors appeared in the 1920s, as a result of technical developments in small petrol engines. These had been driven by improving engine technology, particularly for motorbikes. Such engines now represented an affordable and portable power source. An entire powertrain could be constructed as a single monobloc unit, carried on a single wheel, and this mounted onto a trailer through a large swivel bearing. The engine and its drivetrain represented a relatively high technology machine for the period, although its trailer could be much more crude. The engine units were made by the new light engineering works of the time, such as R A Lister, and custom-made trailers could be produced for a wide range of tasks by less sophisticated workshops, down to village blacksmiths.

The completed vehicles had small wheels and little suspension. This limited their use to smooth floors, such as factories and railway stations, rather than muddy farm tracks or even the roads of the period. In most cases they were replacing hand barrows. Their advantage was that they were faster than a loaded barrow, limited to around the same speed as walking with an empty barrow and they only required one operator, no matter what load. Loads of up to 2 tons could be carried.

Some vehicle were driven by a driver riding or standing on-board with direct tiller steering, others were pedestrian controlled by walking alongside. All were highly manoeuvrable, the full swivel of the self-contained engine unit allowing them to turn within their own length.

Examples include:

- Lister Auto-Truck
- Reliance of Heckmondwike, from 1935, originally the Redshaw Lister Woollen Machinery Co.
- Salsbury Motors 'Turret Truck' of 1946. This used a cylindrical motor enclosure that could be rotated completely to allow reverse. The 6hp motor and continuously variable transmission were based on Salsbury's pre-war scooter designs.

=== Large wheel tractors ===
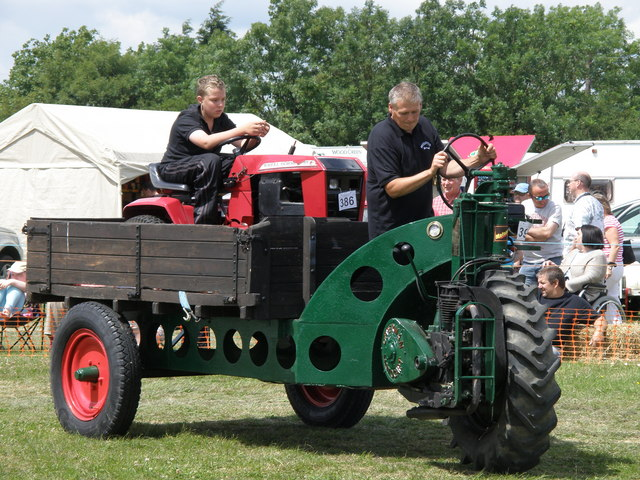
Opperman Motocart

After World War II, tractors were a well-developed and widespread piece of agricultural machinery, although they were still expensive. Some items, such as their large rubber tyres, were particularly difficult as they relied on imported raw materials. Britain, for some years after the war, was in a period of austerity and currency controls applied to overseas purchases. An obvious simplification was to take the technology of the tractor, but use only a single wheel and a smaller engine. Many of the large monowheel tractor's tasks would be in either replacing horse carts, or else as a cheaper substitute for more conventional tractors.

S. E. Opperman of Boreham Wood did this in 1945 with their Opperman Motocart. This used a tricycle cart chassis of welded sheet steel, drawn by a tractor wheel mounted on a single small-diameter kingpin above it. The entire powertrain was carried on the wheel hub, including an 8 brake horsepower (6.0 kW) JAP or 6 1/2 brake horsepower (4.8 kW) Douglas single cylinder petrol engine. Although there was still no suspension other than the large front tractor tyre, the Motocart's wheel steering and large wheels allowed a greater speed than other carts, up to 12 miles per hour (19 km/h) (for legal reasons). Many were road registered, although not provided with full lighting. Using the full range of low gears, a load of up to 2 1/2 tons on trial was carried up steep hills.

A similar, although smaller, vehicle was patented in the US. This was intended as a manoeuvrable light tipper for construction sites.

The monowheel concept continued into the 1960s, although now aimed more at "colonial" overseas use. In 1966 the British government through the NRDC was working on a design developed for the National Institute of Agricultural Engineers.

== See also ==
- Tricycle truck
- Two-wheel tractor
