= Hecker (motorcycle) =

Historical motorcycle manufacturer

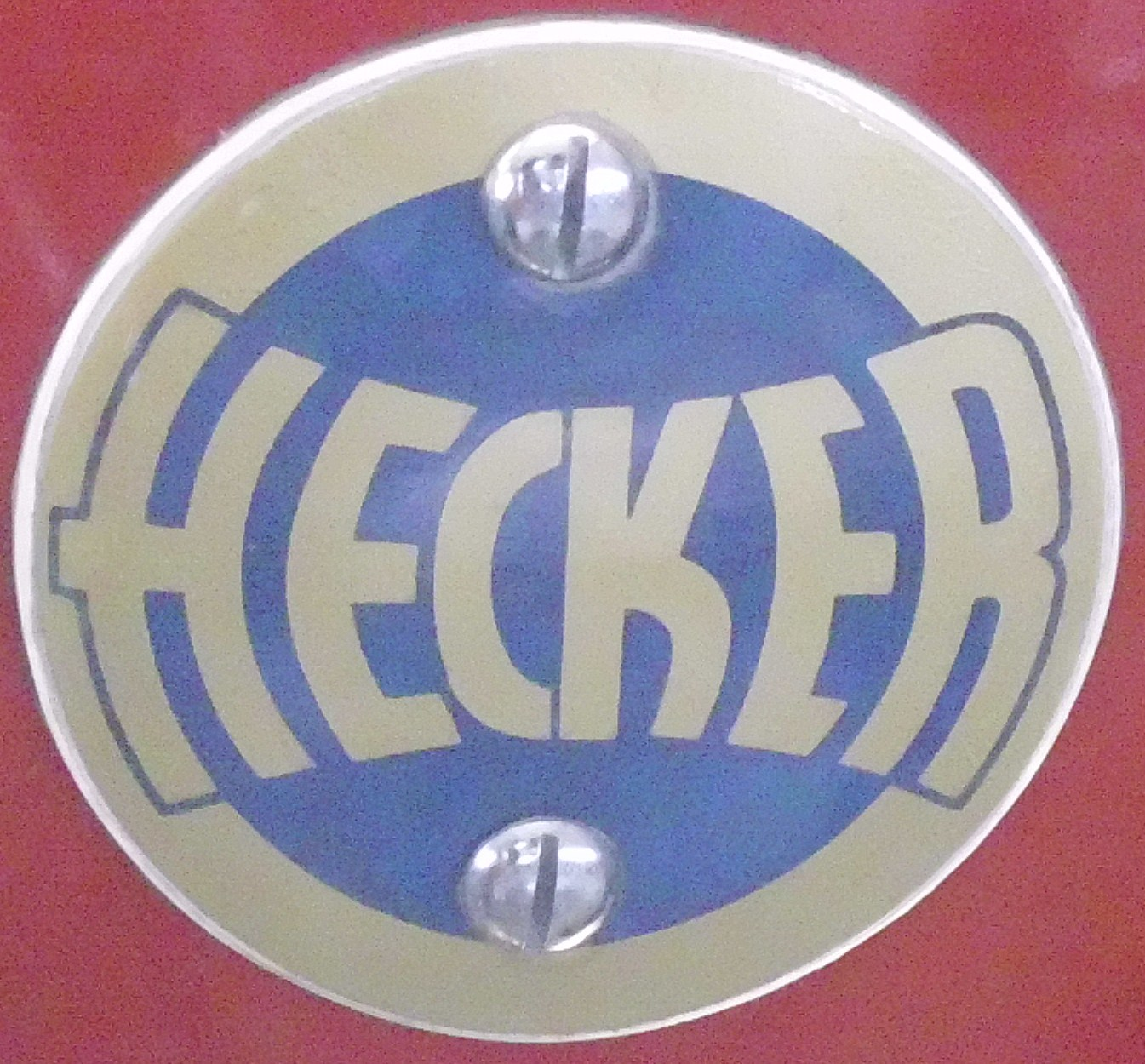

Hecker was a company in Nürnberg, Germany that manufactured motorcycles from 1922 until 1956.

Production began with engines supplied by Scharrer & Groß. In 1925 S & G started making their own motorcycles so Hecker switched to engines from 198cc to 548cc bought from JAP in London, England. In the late 1920s Hecker also manufactured a model with a 746cc V-twin engine from Motosacoche of Switzerland. In 1931 Germany's economic crisis led the company to switch to making lightweight motorcycles powered by Sachs engines. After the Second World War Hecker built lightweight motorcycles with ILO and Villiers engines. Production terminated in 1956.
