= Lister Auto-Truck =

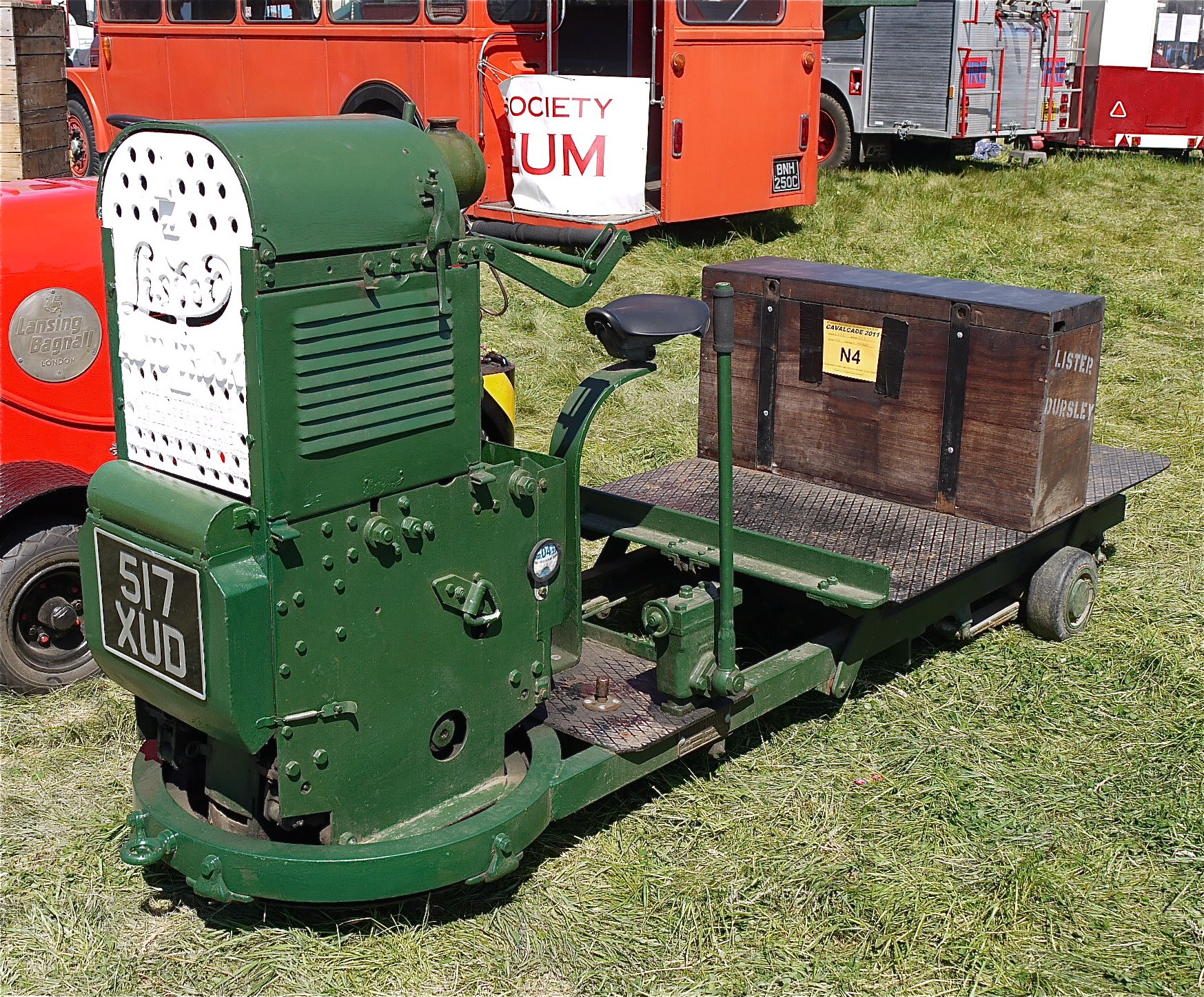
Early Auto-Truck, with small wheels

The Lister Auto-Truck was a small monowheel tractor built for moving light loads around factories, railway yards and similar sites. They were based on a design originally by Auto Mowers Ltd, and were built by R A Lister and Company of Dursley, Gloucestershire, well known for their range of small stationary engines (although the Auto Truck used a J.A.P. petrol engine). A narrow-gauge rail version of the Auto-Truck (the Rail-Truck) was made along similar stylistic lines as regards the bonnetted engine, and its light weight made it popular for temporary and lightly laid tracks such as used on brickworks, peat bogs, and construction sites. Production of both the Auto-Truck and the Rail-Truck extended from the 1920s to the 1970s.

== Description ==
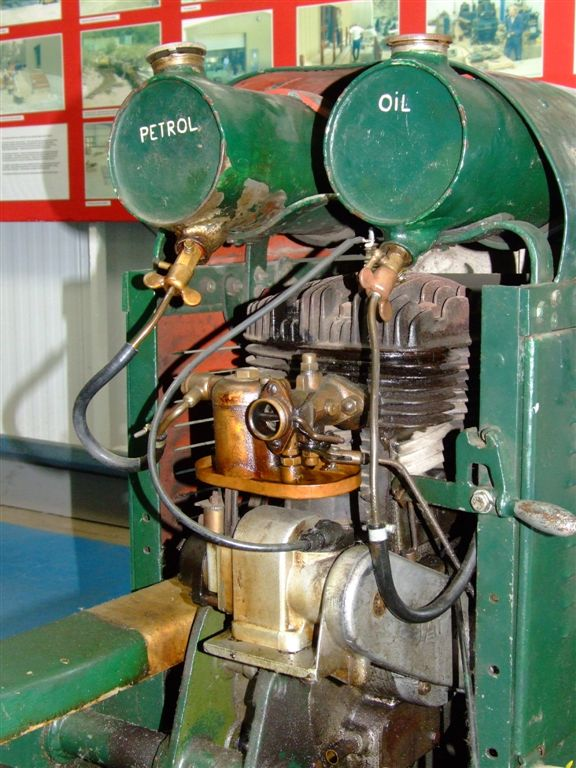
Engine compartment of a Rail-Truck

The Auto-Truck was one of several monowheel tractors to appear in the 1920s and '30s, with the availability of small, reliable petrol engines, as developed for motorcycles and the stationary engines for which Lister were already known. These were tricycle vehicles, with the single leading wheel used for both drive and steering. Their simple construction carried most of the mechanism on this wheel as a single unit, the chassis with the trailing wheels being little more than a trailer for balance. Simplicity was a key feature. The engines were single-cylinder and air-cooled. Ignition was by magneto, rather than requiring a battery and electrical system.

One of these designs was produced in the 1920s by George Grist of the Auto Mower Co., Norton St Philip, Somerset. The engine was a JAP 600 cc four-stroke air-cooled sidevalve, a typical small engine of the time. The Auto Mower Co. were Lister agents and when Lister heard of this 'Auto-Truck' they bought one for use in their own factory. It was used to carry heavy engine castings from the foundry to the machine shop. Lister customers saw them and there was such interest in wanting to buy them that Lister negotiated with Auto Mower to build them under licence. Although Lister were already well known for their small petrol stationary engines, these were heavy cast-iron engines with water hopper cooling and unsuitable for vehicle use. Lister remained with the JAP engine for the Auto-Truck.

The Auto-Truck was designed for use in factories or other places with smooth surfaces of concrete or tarmac. This allowed the use of small solid-tyred wheels with only simple suspension, making the vehicle simple, cheap and lightweight. They had little ability on soft surfaces though and could even topple over if driven carelessly across slopes.

Their design was a compromise between the top-heavy nature of the tall engine grouping above its wheel and a well thought-out chassis for stability. The bearing between them was a large diameter ring roller bearing, mounted at the lowest part of the chassis. This gave rigidity and stability, even after long wear. A ring of rolled channel girder was attached to the engine group and rollers on the chassis carried the load upon this. On early Auto-Trucks this bearing is set very low, in line with the chassis members, and is covered by thin steel plates. The front panel of the engine cover is distinctive with large ventilation holes and a Lister signature cut through it. Strangely this panel is made of thick cast iron, providing substantial weight high on the engine and only adding to its top heaviness. To improve visibility of moving vehicles in noisy factories, this panel was often painted white, the rest of the vehicle being Lister's usual brunswick green.

The driver was seated on a Brooks bicycle saddle, which in recognition of the lack of vehicle suspension, was carried on the end of a cantilevered bar that acted as a leaf spring. A wide handlebar on the engine group was used for steering. A squeeze bar the width of this handlebar engaged the clutch. Controls included a hand throttle, a gear lever with two forward and one reverse gears, and a large handbrake lever. The engine unit rotated freely for a full 360° rotation. When used in reverse, the Auto-Truck could either be driven from the saddle, looking backwards over the driver's shoulder; or they could dismount, swivel the engine unit around and control it as a pedestrian-controlled truck from behind.

Under the engine cover were two equal diameter tanks, a fuel tank for petrol and a shorter oil tank. Engine and chain-drive lubrication used a total-loss oil system, controlled by a small pump and needle valve.

== Variations ==
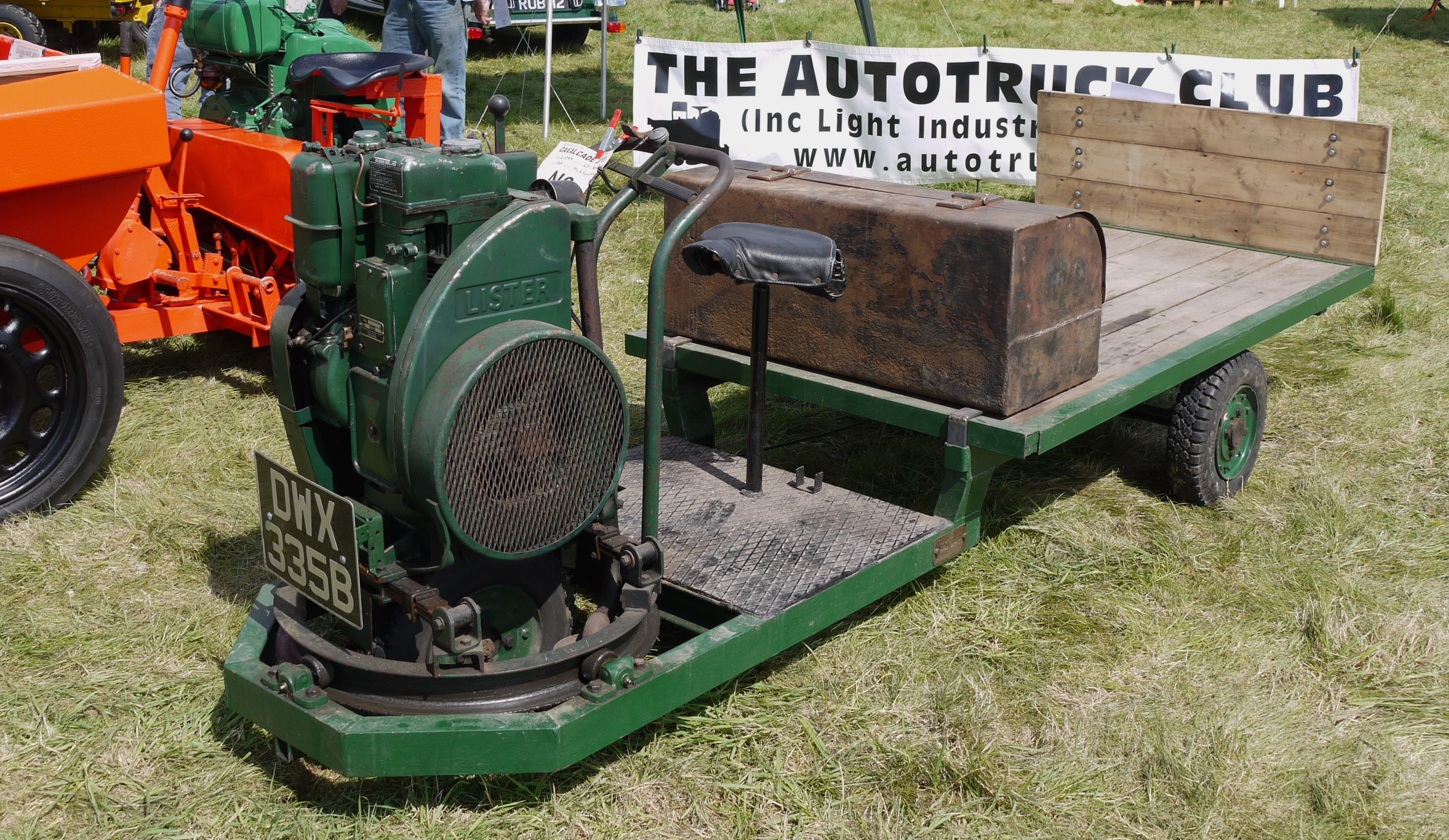
Later, 1964, diesel-engined Auto-Truck with long chassis and road wheels

Variations of the basic Auto-Truck were soon produced. These included lifting platform bodies with a hydraulic pump and a long hand lever alongside the driver's saddle. They were used either for moving heavy loads around factories, to avoid lifting, or else as a pallet truck which could be moved under a wooden platform before lifting it off the floor to move it. Tipping hoppers were also made, although owing to the limitations of the small wheels, these were not intended for gardens or construction sites, as has often been claimed, but were mostly for collecting waste materials around factories. Another variation shortened the body and the truck was used for towing trailers.

Road performance of the Auto-Truck was improved by fitting larger rear wheels with pneumatic tyres. Several tyre and suspension spring options remained in production throughout its history. An early development even offered the Auto-Truck as a lightweight tractor for use on roads, sold to local councils and the like for street cleaning. Many Auto-Trucks were registered for road use and carried a number plate, but none are known to have had lighting or other road equipment fitted.

== Later vehicles ==
Many detail changes were made over the years, and a major change from JAP petrol engines to Lister's own diesel engines. The bearing ring was moved above the chassis members and no longer enclosed. This gave better access for greasing and adjusting the rollers.

Late vehicles had diesel engines, the Lister single cylinder LD1 or twin cylinder LD2 engines of 3.5 or 7 bhp @ 1800 rpm. The LD engines were already shrouded around their flywheel, cooling fan and the cylinder head fins and so there was no longer any need for the distinctive Auto-Truck engine cover or front plate. These late machines also used leaf spring front suspension, where the bearing ring was supported on the engine group by a pair of leaf springs. This gave much better isolation between front wheel bumps and the chassis, but the high unsprung weight, a drawback for all monowheel tractors, meant that they were still not high speed or effective road vehicles. By the mid 1950s, all production was diesel engined.

In 1965 the Hawker Siddeley Group bought Lister and in 1968 the electrical equipment company Crompton Parkinson too. Soon after this, Crompton produced a battery-powered electric version of the Auto-Truck. Different battery capacities, using 24V or 36V batteries of the same size cells, were offered according to the demands of the working day.

In 1973 all Auto-Truck production was transferred to the Crompton works at Tredegar. The old Auto-Truck shop at Dursley became the apprentice training school. There appears to have been some overlap though, with chassis production continuing in Dursley until 1975 when production ceased. The design was sold to DP (David Proctor) Engineering of Aldridge, later becoming MWM Powertrucks and finally DPR Engineering at Cannock. Production finally ended completely in the 1990s.

== Rail-Trucks ==
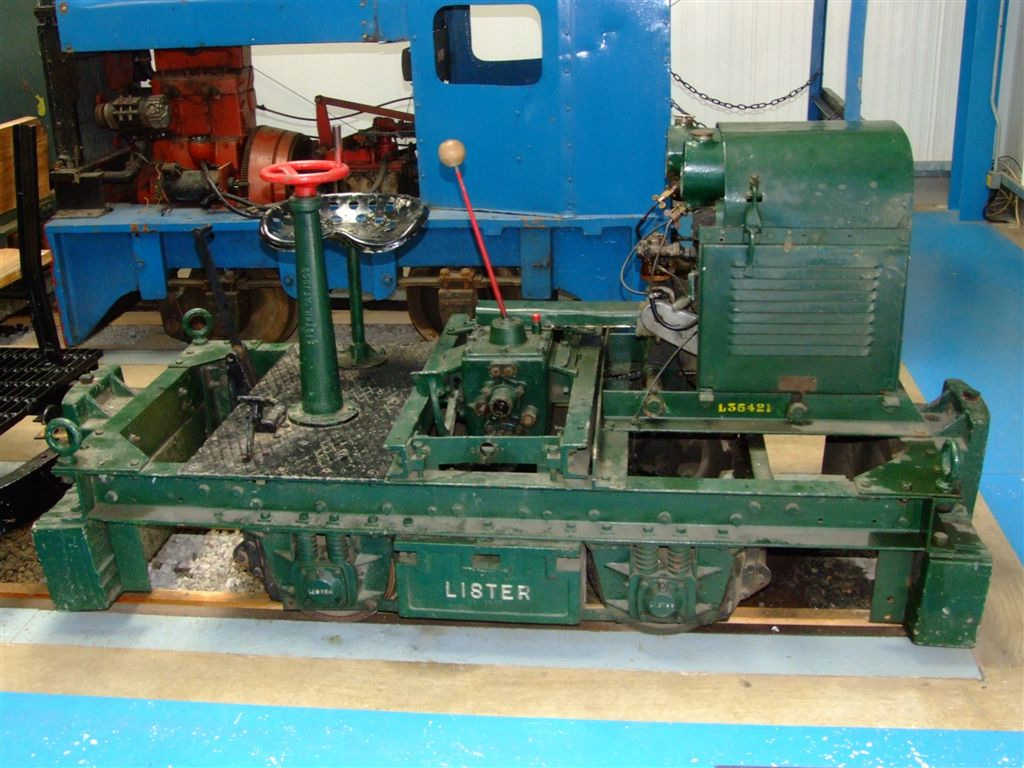
Narrow gauge Rail-Truck, at the Amberly Chalk Pits museum

From 1928, the Auto-Truck mechanism was also used to make a small narrow gauge locomotive or 'Rail-Truck'. Motor Rail had provided a large number of its robust and reliable "Simplex" locomotives for service in World War I and Lister were keen to gain a share of their post-war market. With suitable gearing, even a small engine could pull a usefully heavy load on rails, although with limited speed. The "Rail-Truck" locomotives that Lister produced were some of the lightest locomotives available and so were particularly suitable for use on poorly laid or temporary tracks. They were used for construction sites, waterworks, peat cutting, small quarries and clay or gravel pits. Several hundred had been built by 1940, an exceptionally large production run for British narrow gauge locomotives.

The same engine and cover was used, with chain drives to the axles from a Lister-built gearbox with two speeds in each direction, for a top speed of 6 mph. The driver sat sideways on a fixed pressed-steel tractor seat, being able to face in either direction. Their controls were a screw handbrake on a prominent cast-iron pillar in front of them (moved rearwards on diesels), a long gear lever and a foot-operated clutch. The throttle was operated by a pedal using the driver's right foot. The original model 'R' Rail-Truck was fitted with the same 600 cc JAP engine of 4–6 bhp as the Auto-Truck. A later 'RT' model was fitted with a 980 cc v-twin engine of 9.8 bhp, later, 1, 2 & 3 cylinder Lister diesel 'LD series' engines were fitted from new without engine bonnets, and with the brakewheel moved to the driver's right hand side.

In urban situations the locomotives could be stored under cover at night. In remote and nomadic locations, such as peat bogs, there was no shelter and so the locomotives were also available with a fitted roof. This was a simple wooden canopy on four poles at the corners, with canvas dodgers or side-screens that could be rolled up. This canopy also provided some weather protection for the driver.

From 1928 up to 1956, around 350 Rail-Trucks were built. Production continued into the early 1970s, although Lister's records were later destroyed by the 1983 fire. The oldest known surviving Rail-Truck, No 873 of 1928, is preserved in a Dutch museum. Around 90 Rail-Trucks survive in total.

=== Typical dimensions ===
Gauge	2 ft (610 mm)
Length	
over frame	6 ft 6 in (1,981 mm)
over buffers	7 ft 6 in (2,286 mm)
Width	3 ft 1 in (940 mm)
Height	3 ft 9 in (1,143 mm)
Wheelbase	2 ft 6 in (762 mm)
Wheel diameter	12 in (305 mm)
Minimum curve radius	20 ft (6,096 mm)

== Preservation ==
A vast number of Lister engines have been preserved, including many Auto-Trucks. Some Rail-Trucks are still in use and working with their original owners on peat bogs and clay pits. As for other Listers, the spares availability is still good, encouraging their easy restoration.

An Auto-Truck is on display at the Dursley Heritage Centre, together with other exhibits on the important place of Lister's within the town.

An Auto-truck is also on display in the foyer of STEAM Museum of the Great Western Railway, situated in one of the original buildings of Swindon Railway Works.
