= Lyster, Quebec =

Lyster
- Municipality
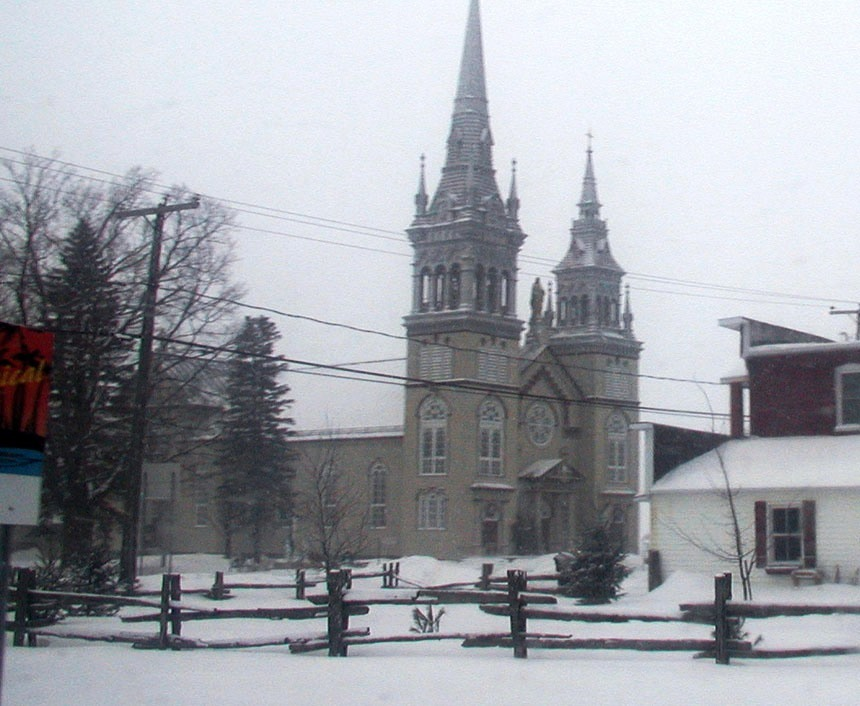

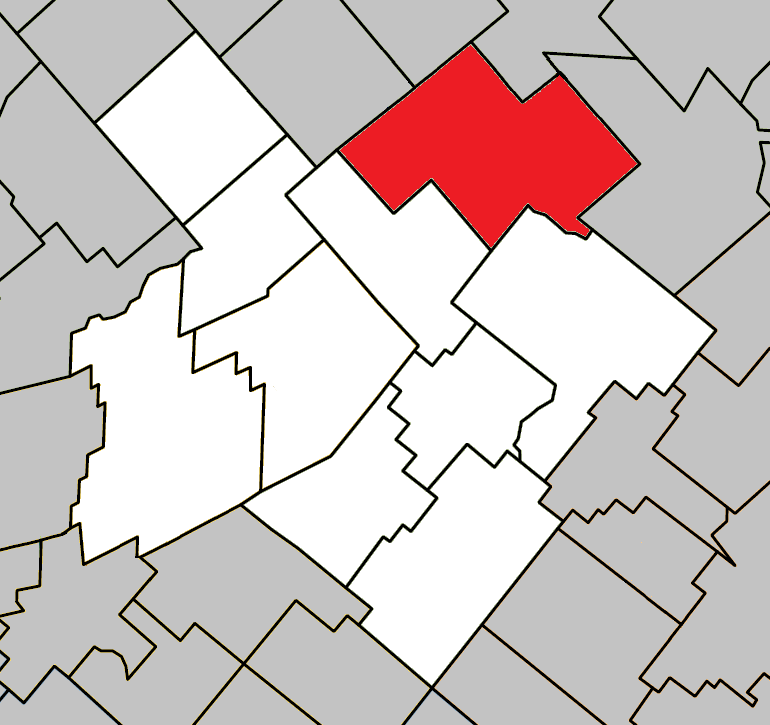
- Location within L'Érable RCM

- Location in southern Quebec
- Coordinates: 46°22′N 71°37′W
- Country: Canada
- Province: Quebec
- Region: Centre-du-Québec
- RCM: L'Érable
- Constituted: September 18, 1976
- Named for: Leicester

Government
  - Mayor: Yves Boissonneault
  - Federal riding: Mégantic—L'Érable—Lotbinière
  - Prov. riding: Arthabaska–L'Érable

Area
  - Total: 167.80 km^{2} (64.79 sq mi)
  - Land: 167.55 km^{2} (64.69 sq mi)

Population (2021)
  - Total: 1,587
  - Density: 9.5/km^{2} (25/sq mi)
  - Pop 2016-2021: ▼1.1%
  - Dwellings: 776
- Time zone: UTC−5 (EST)
  - Summer (DST): UTC−4 (EDT)
- Postal code(s): G0S 1V0
- Area code: 819
- Highways: R-116; R-218
- Website: www.lyster.ca

Lyster (French pronunciation: [lɪstɛːʁ]) is a municipality in the Centre-du-Québec region of the province of Quebec in Canada. It was created with the fusion of Sainte-Anastasie-de-Nelson and the village of Lyster in 1976.

== Demographics ==
Historical Census Data - Lyster, Quebec
Year	Pop.	±%
1981	1,985	—
1986	1,872	−5.7%
1991	1,740	−7.1%
1996	1,715	−1.4%
2001	1,685	−1.7%
2006	1,644	−2.4%
2011	1,628	−1.0%
2016	1,605	−1.4%
2021	1,587	−1.1%

In the 2021 Census of Population conducted by Statistics Canada, Lyster had a population of 1,587 living in 681 of its 776 total private dwellings, a change of −1.1% from its 2016 population of 1,605. With a land area of 167.55 km^{2} (64.69 sq mi), it had a population density of 9.5/km^{2} (24.5/sq mi) in 2021.

== See also ==
- Lyster
