= Dresch =

Historical French motorcycle manufacturer

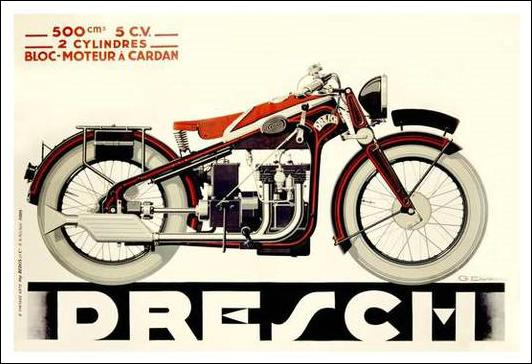
1935 advertisement for Dresch Monobloc

Dresch et Cie (1920–1949) was one of France's more important motorcycle manufacturers. It was founded in Étampes, France by the eccentric multi-millionaire French-Algerian industrialist Henri Dresch, whose other business interests included an upmarket spa hotel. Within five months of its founding, it was able to rise to the forefront of its specialty, going on to use advanced designs such as pressed-steel frames and forks and shaft drives, and later moved to the Everest factory in Paris's 15th arrondissement.

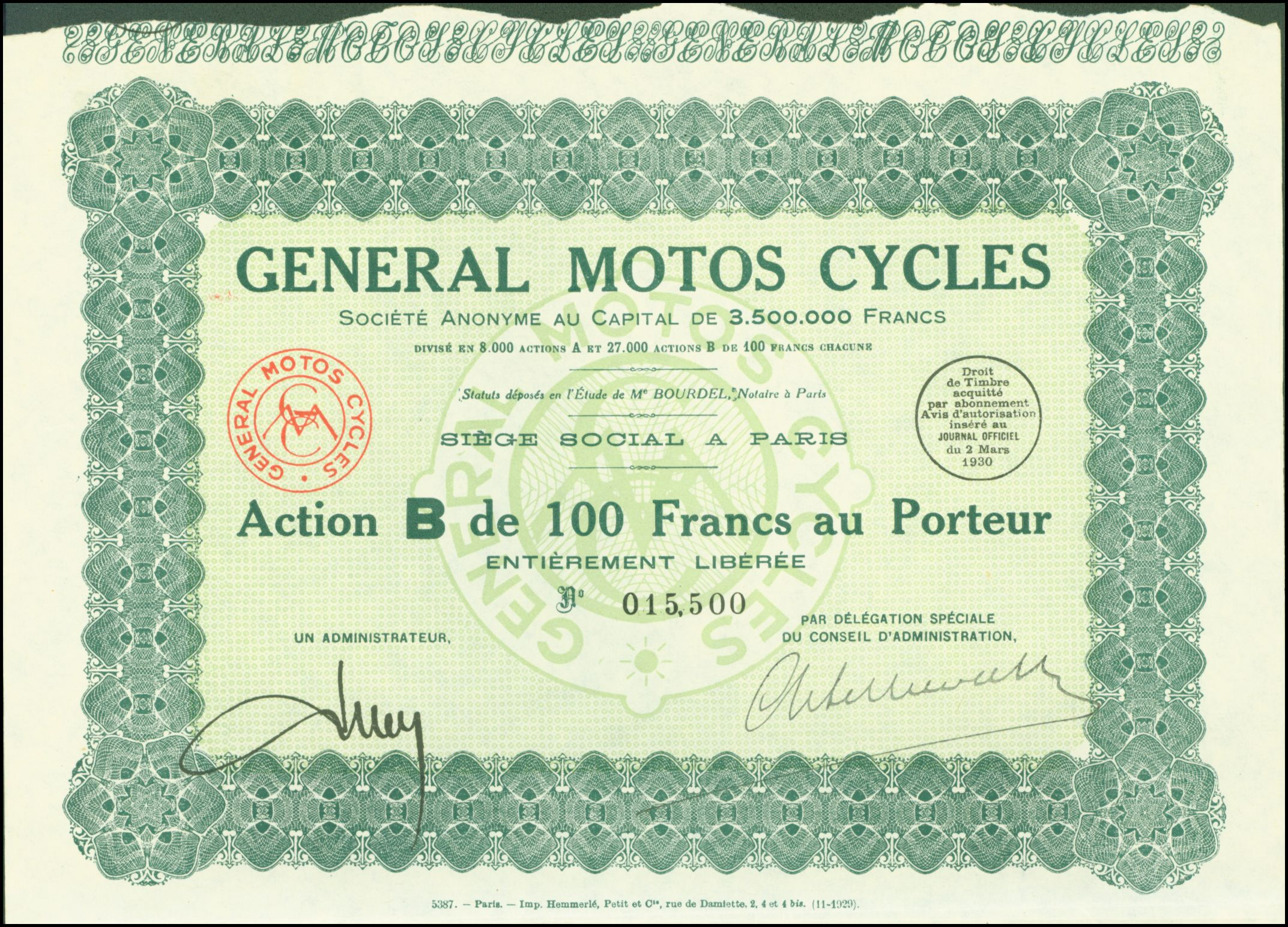
Share of the General Motos Cycles S.A., issued 2. March 1930

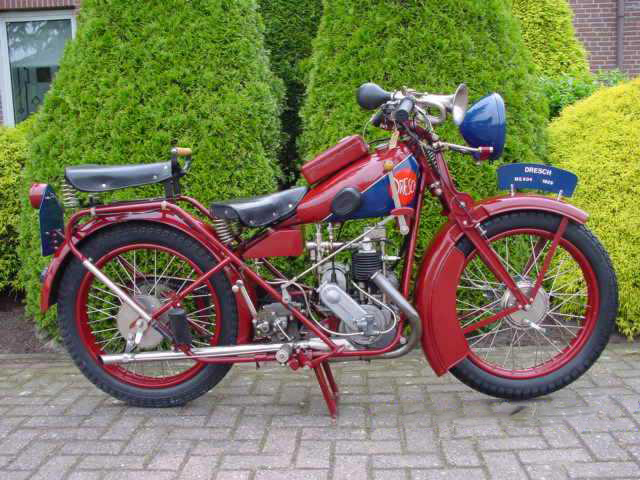
1929 250cc Dresch MS 604

The company's products ranged from 98cc to 246cc single-cylinder two-stroke machines to luxury 750cc four-cylinder model. Dresch used proprietary engines from various suppliers including Aubier Dunne, Chaise, JAP, MAG, Stainless and Train. In 1930, it produced a 498cc inline-twin model similar to the later British Sunbeam models.

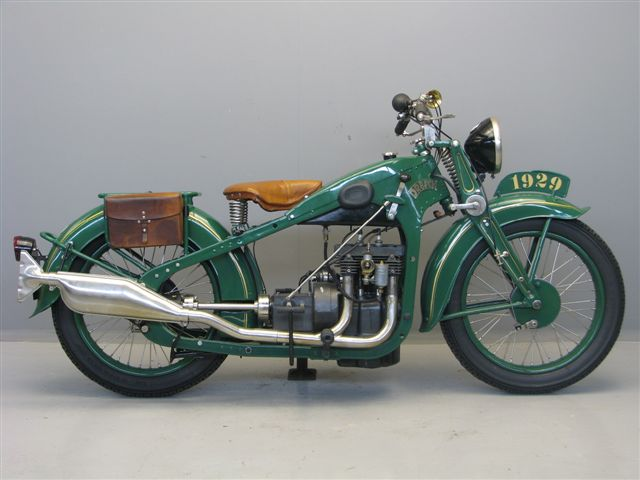
1929 500cc Dresch Monobloc

Dresch was a large company that produced up to 10,000 solo and sidecar-mounted motorcycles per year and bought other motorcycle companies such as Le Grimpeur in 1926, PS, Everest and in 1928, DFR. It aimed to sell good-quality, low-cost vehicles. The company built motorcycles for the Paris police. During its history, it went through numerous restructurings as Général Motos Cycles in 1929, Dresch-Macam, DFR-Macam in 1932 and, ultimately, SA Dreschmotor.

Production ended in 1939 and the factory was mothballed, due to the Second World War, but the company attempted to restart after it afterwards and launch its planned "Baltimore" model, a 350cc single with shaft drive. Dresch never resumed production; however, a prototype Baltimore model was eventually shown at an exhibition in 1948 and the company continued producing spare parts into the 1950s. Unfortunately, pre-orders were insufficient and production was halted.

== Bibliography ==
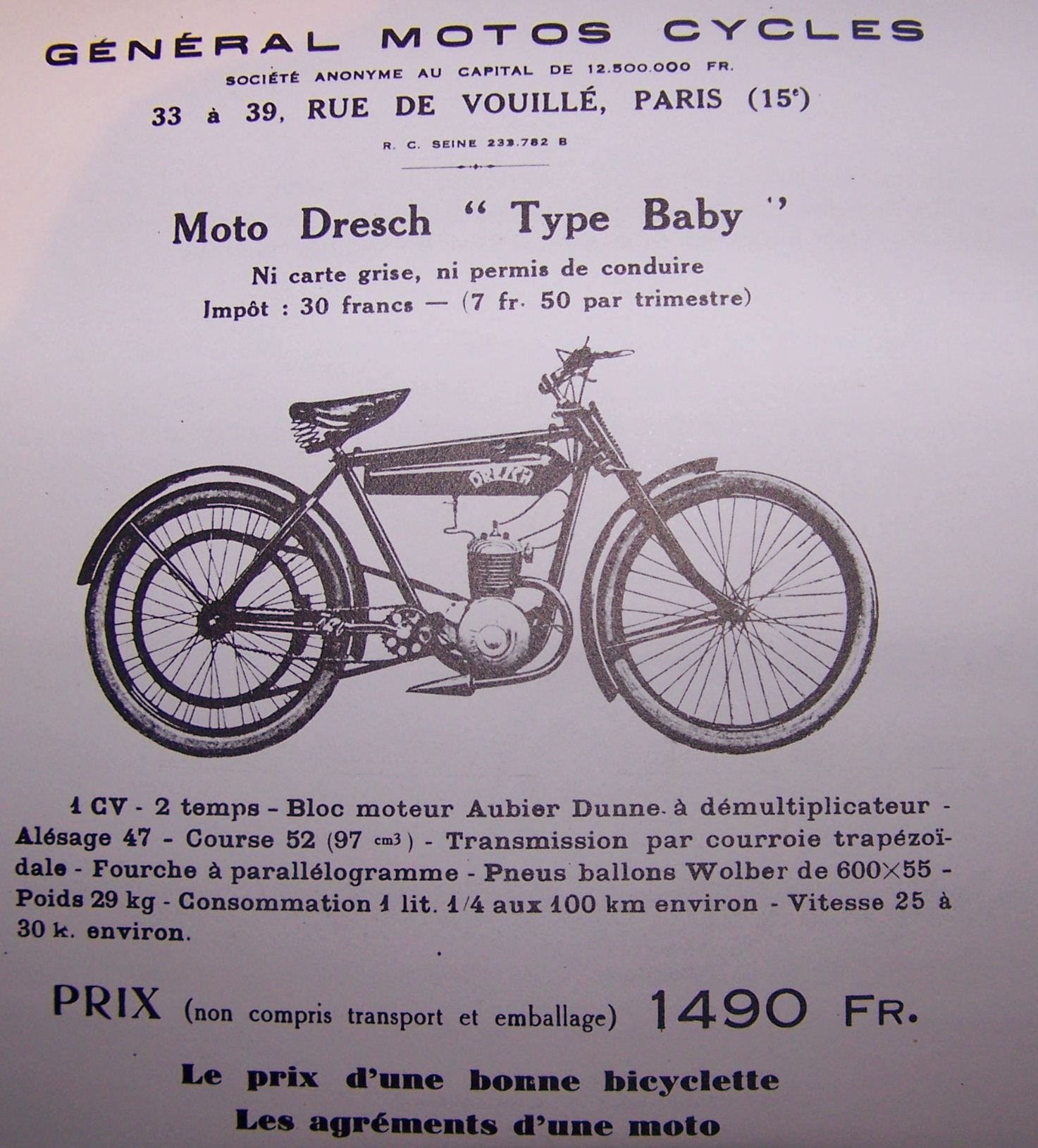

- Erwin Tragatsch, Alle Motorräder 1894-1981: Eine Typengeschichte. 2500 Marken aus 30 Ländern, Stuttgart 1997. ISBN 3-87943-410-7
