= Lister Hall =

Theatre in Dursley, Gloucestershire, United Kingdom

Coordinates: 51.68177°N 2.35233°W

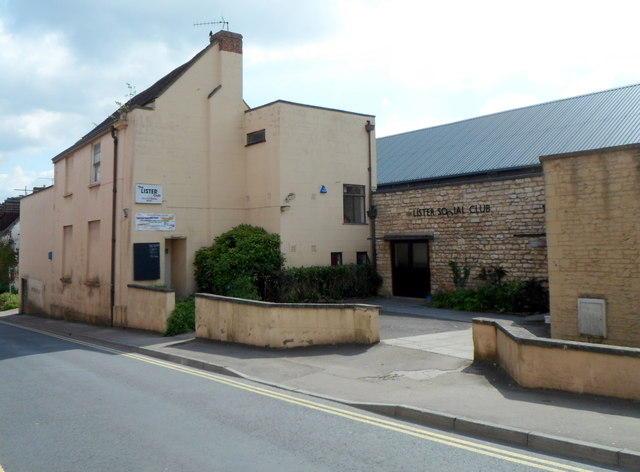
Lister Social Club

Lister Hall is a theatre, in Dursley, Gloucestershire, England, which was formerly part of the social centre for the engineering firm R A Lister and Company, from which it takes its name.

Dursley's Lister Hall is a full-size traditional theatre and dance-hall. Since its foundation in 1926 it has hosted numerous dramatic productions and been the hub of many social events in Dursley. It is the home of the Dursley Operatic and Dramatic Society, which celebrated its Diamond Jubilee in 2013, and of Dursley Male Voice Choir, which has a long-standing tradition of putting on choral concerts in Dursley. Other events at Lister Hall include rock concerts, Latino-style dance nights, social events, and wrestling.

Lister Social Club is housed in the same building as the Lister Hall, which is now known as the Chantry Centre. The club became independent from the engineering firm ('Listers') after the company underwent a change of ownership, but its membership continued to thrive, with regular activities, including a skittles league. At the end of 2012 the club formally ceased to exist, but its social activities will continue under the auspices of the Chantry Centre. The Centre is managed by a board of Trustees and, at time of writing, has no formal public support or finance.

There is a local commitment to keep the Lister Hall and Chantry Centre running, but there is a need for funds to update facilities, so the Trustees are happy to receive suggestions and offers of assistance. The Chantry Centre runs a Friends scheme, which enables individuals to support the centre in return for certain benefits.
