= John Alfred Prestwich =

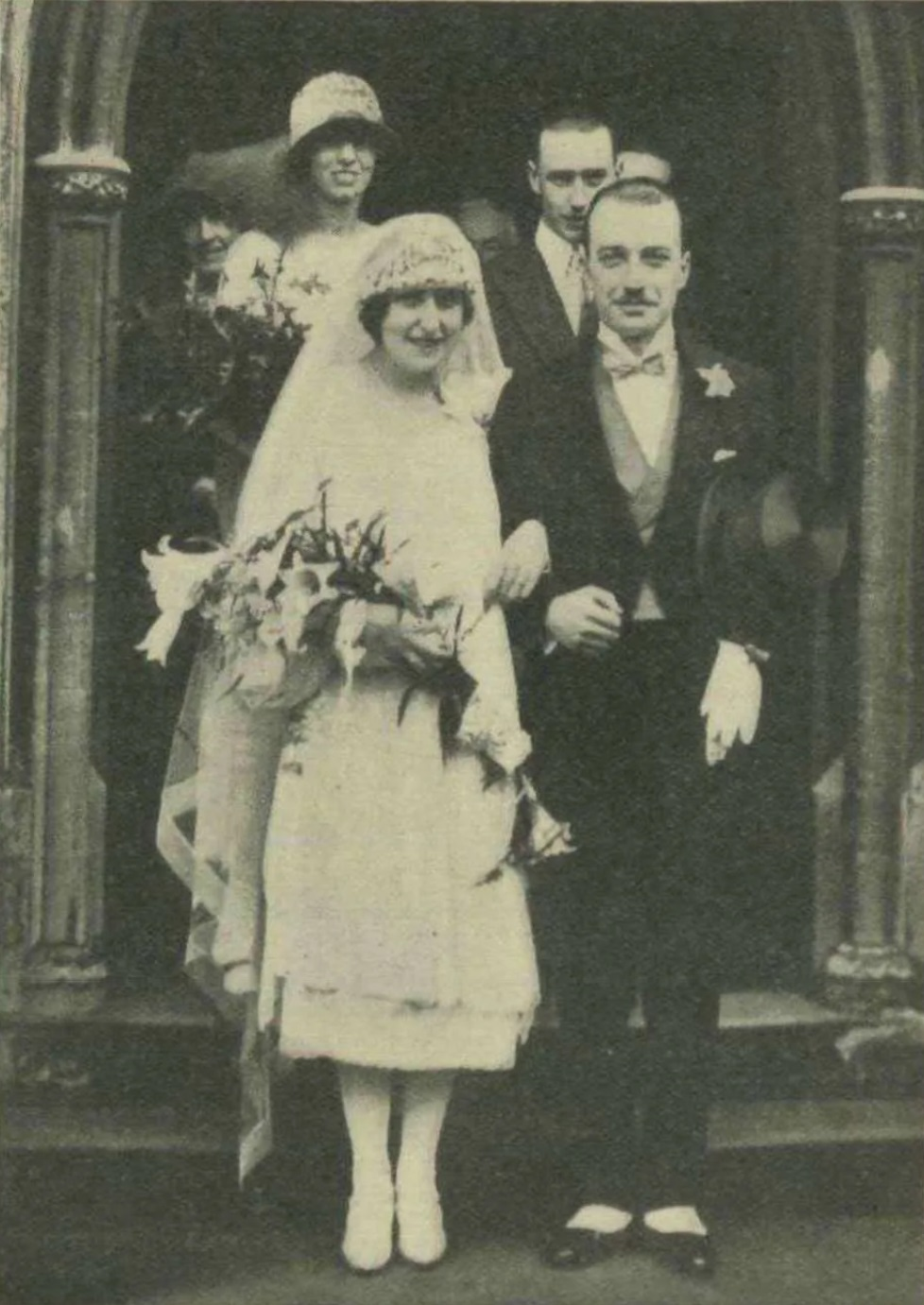
In 1925 Prestwich married Phyllis Copley

John Alfred Prestwich (1874 – 1952) was an English engineer and inventor. He founded JA Prestwich Industries Ltd in 1895 and was a pioneer in the early development of cinematography projectors and cameras. The company also manufactured famous JAP motorcycle engines.

He worked with S.Z. de Ferranti and later cinema pioneer William Friese-Greene.

He was awarded the Edward Longstreth Medal by the Franklin Institute in 1919.
