= T.B. (Thompson Brothers) =

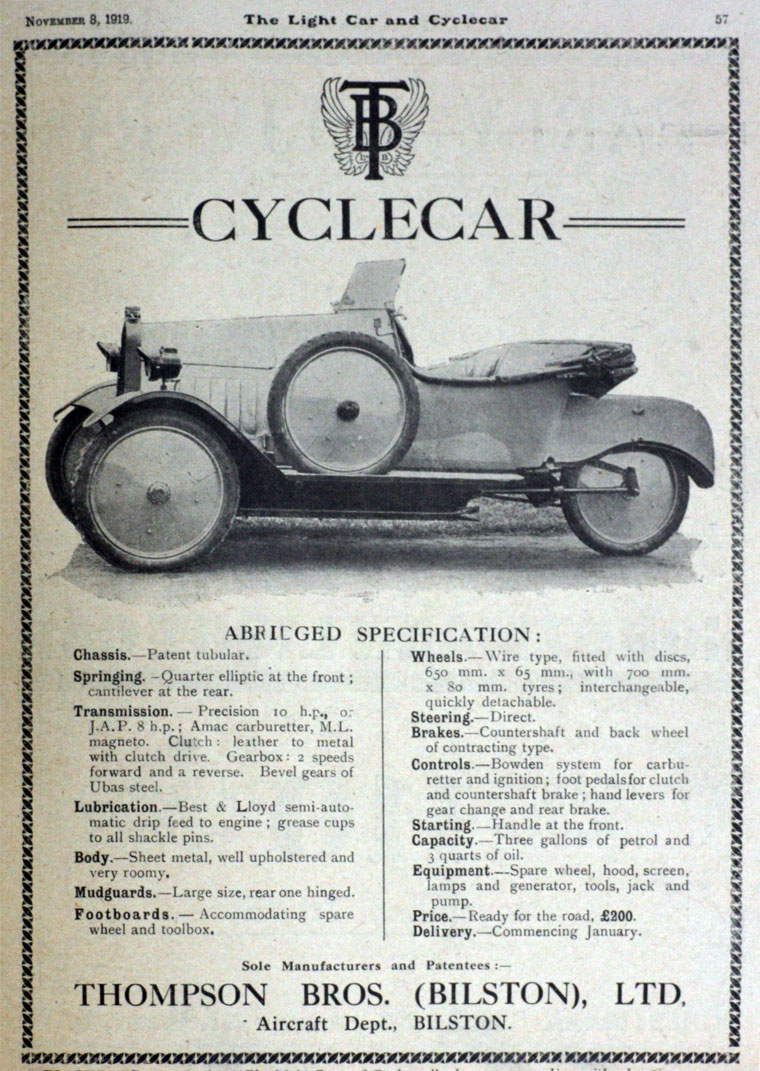
- Advert in The Light Car and Cyclecar, 8 November 1919

Overview
- Manufacturer: Thompson Brothers
- Production: 1919-1924

Body and chassis
- Class: Cyclecar
- Layout: 3 wheeler
- Platform: Patent tubular

Powertrain
- Engine: Precision 10 h.p., or J.A.P. 8 h.p.
- Transmission: 2 or 3 speeds forward, plus reverse Leather/metal clutch

Dimensions
- Wheelbase: 7 ft 6 in
- Length: 10 ft 6 in
- Width: 5 ft 0 in

T.B. was a three-wheeled cyclecar manufactured by the aircraft department of Thompson Brothers of Bilston, England, from 1919 until 1924. A prototype four-wheel car never entered production. Approximately 150 cars were produced of which only one example is believed to have survived.

== History ==
Thompson Brothers was founded in 1810 in Bilston in the Black Country region of South Staffordshire (now the West Midlands), and in 1882 it was purchased by Enoch Stephen Thompson. The company was based at the Bradley Engineering Works, on Great Bridge Road, Bilston. Initially they manufactured steam boilers, but during World War I they diversified into aircraft components. After the war the tax regulations lead to a boom in cyclecar production so the aircraft department produced a three-wheeled, open, two seater, cycle car that followed aircraft engineering practises and workmanship standards, using high grade materials.

The main appeal of cycle-cars was cheapness to buy and run, but in the overpopulated car market of the 1920s the cost of four-wheeled cars fell to that of cycle-cars, the business tailed off, component acquisition was troublesome, and T.B. only sold 150 cars. Although they designed a four-wheeled car it was never produced.

After the demise of the cyclecar business Thompson became a leading manufacturer of commercial vehicles such as fuel tankers and airport fire tenders.

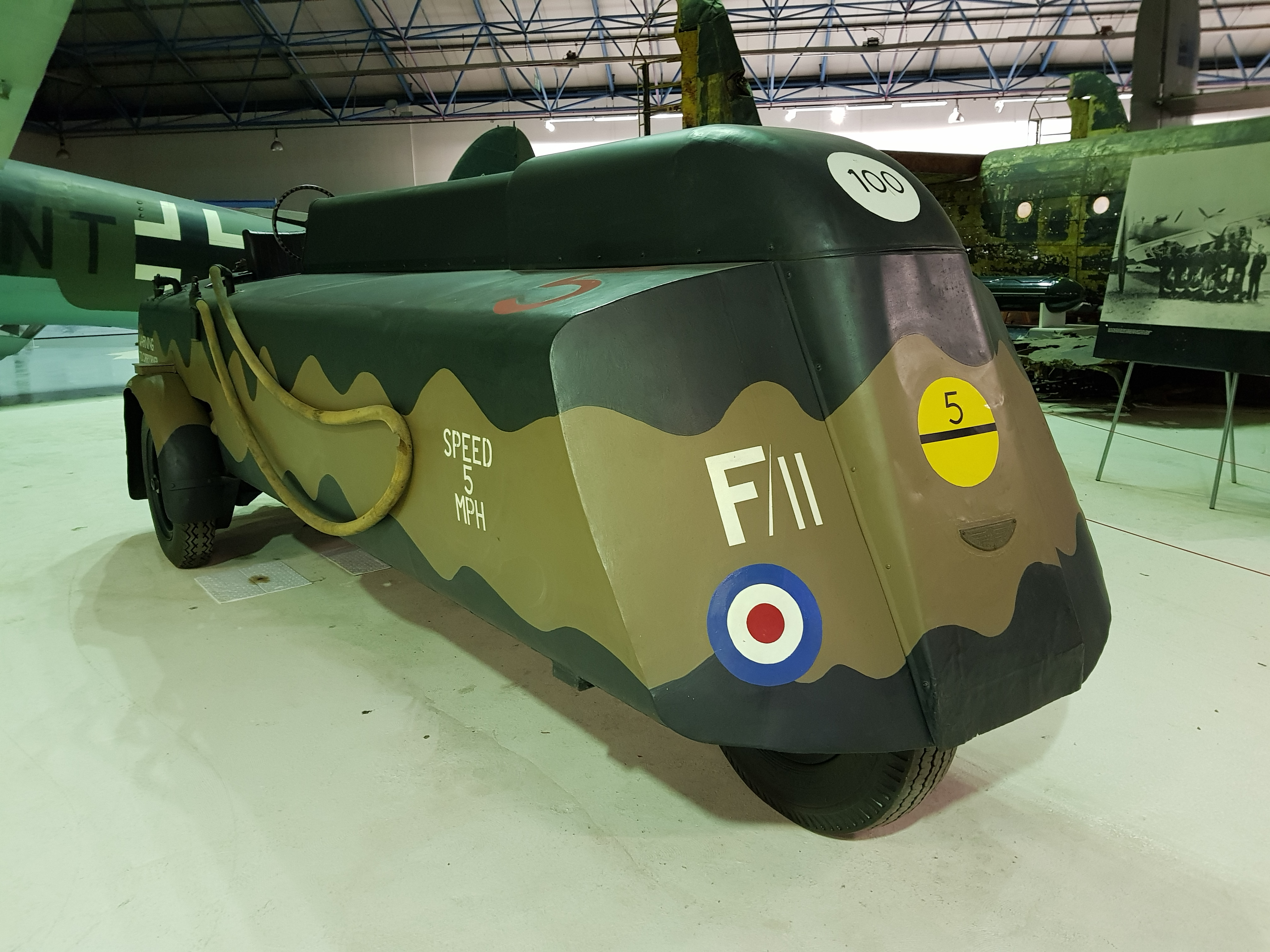
RAF fuel tender

In 1935, an unusual three-wheeled aircraft refueller was successfully introduced for servicing light aeroplanes at civil aerodromes and during World War II many later variants were manufactured for military use. Many continued in use at civil aerodromes and airports in Britain until the 1960s and 1970s with a few still in use (e.g. at North Weald and Leicester East) in the 1990s. At least 20 examples are known to survive worldwide with museums and private owners today.

Eventually the company became part of the Northern Engineering Industries Group.

== Models ==
Advert in The Light Car and Cyclecar, November 8, 1919, introducing T.B. :-

T.B. Cyclecar
Abridged specification:

Chassis. - Patent tubular.

Springing. - Quarter elliptic at the front: cantilever at the rear.

Transmission. - Precision 10 h.p., or J.A.P. 8 h.p. : Amac carburetter, M.L.magneto. Clutch - leather to metal with clutch drive. Gearbox:2 speeds forward and a reverse. Bevel gears of Ubas steel.

Lubrication. - Best & Lloyd semi-automatic drip feed to engine : grease cups to all shackle pins

Body. - Sheet metal, well upholstered and very roomy.

Mudguards. - Large sized, rear one hinged.

Footboards. - Accommodating spare wheel and toolbox.

Wheels. - Wire type, fitted with discs, 650mm x 65mm, with 700mm x 80mm tyres; interchangeable, quickly detachable.

Steering. - Direct.

Brakes. - Countershaft and back wheel of detaching type.

Controls. - Bowden system for carburetter and ignition; footpedals for clutch and countershaft brake; hand levers for gear change and rear brake.

Starting. - Handle at front.

Capacity. - Three gallons of petrol and 3 quarts of oil.

Equipment. - Spare wheel, hood, screen, lamps and generator, tools, jack and pump.

(Wheelbase. - 4' 0" x 7' 6"; Overall size, 10' 6" x 5' 0")

(Petrol Consumption. - 50 miles per gallon)

(Tax. - As motor cycle and side-car (£4))

Price. - Ready for the road, £200.

Delivery. - Commencing January.

Sole Manufacturers and Patentees :-
Thompson Bros. (Bilston), LTD.
Aircraft Dept., Bilston.

— The Light Car and Cyclecar, November 8, 1919

The first model produced was the 1920 cyclecar equipped with a 10 hp. air-cooled engine mated to a leather clutch and two-speed gearbox. Design and development had taken approximately 12 months and a prototype completed a 2,000 mile test. The shapely "radiator" was a combined three-gallon petrol tank and three-quart oil tank.

By 1921 they used a 10 hp JAP water-cooled engine and a floating plate clutch to drive the three-speed gearbox.

By 1924 the sports model was equipped with a 10 hp water-cooled Anzani engine and an aluminium body.

=== List of models ===
Primary table source : University of Wolverhampton. History and Heritage, Thompson Brothers

- 1920 Cycle car. 10 hp, air-cooled, steel body. £200.
- 1921 Standard. 8-10 hp, J.A.P. air-cooled, steel body. £235.
- 1921 Deluxe. 8-10 hp, J.A.P. water-cooled, steel body. £250.
- 1922 Standard. 8-10 hp, J.A.P. air-cooled, steel body. £155.
- 1922 Deluxe. 8-10 hp, J.A.P. water-cooled, steel body. £165.
- 1922 Sports. 8-10 hp, J.A.P. water-cooled, steel body.
- 1923 Standard. 8-10 hp, J.A.P. air-cooled, steel body. £155.
- 1923 Deluxe. 8-10 hp, J.A.P. water-cooled, steel body. £165.
- 1923 Sports. 8-10 hp, J.A.P. water-cooled, steel body.
- 1924 Standard. 8-10 hp, J.A.P. air-cooled), steel body. £152
- 1924 Deluxe. 8-10 hp, J.A.P. water-cooled, steel body. £160
- 1924 Family. 8-10 hp, J.A.P. water-cooled, steel body. £162
- 1924 Sports. 8-10 hp, Anzani. water-cooled, aluminium body. £170

== Competition ==
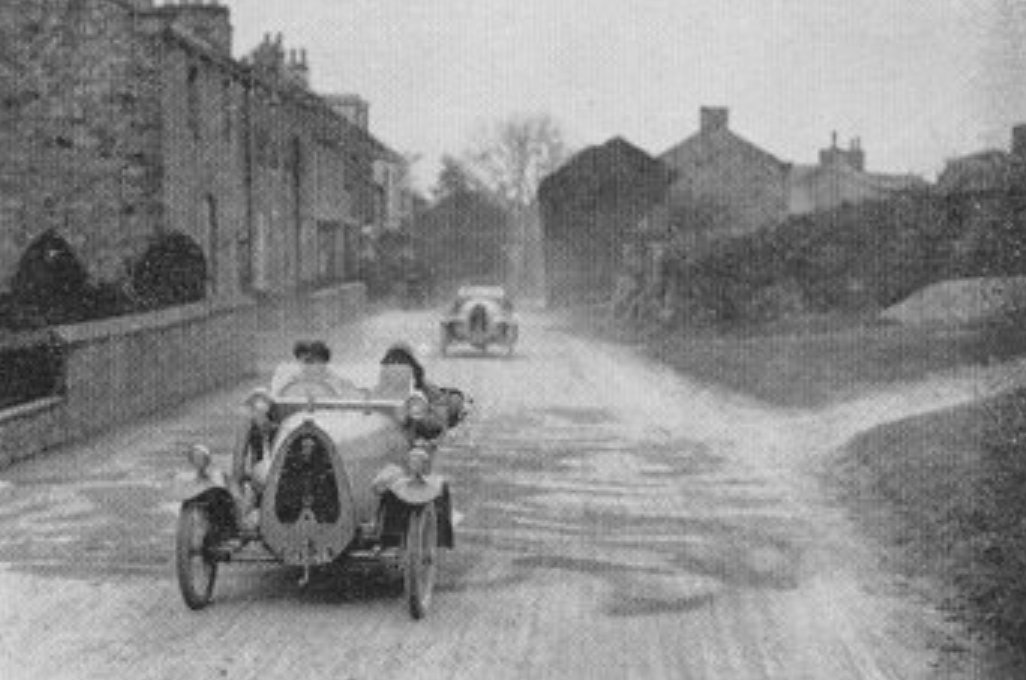
T.B. cyclecar competing in the 1920 M.C.C. London to Edinburgh Trial.

From 1920 to 1922 T.B.s competed regularly in national events, scoring 27 victories, 31 gold medals, 12 silver and 5 bronze.

They competed in:

- 1920 - London-Edinburgh; London-Holyhead; London-Bala-London; London-Exeter-London
- 1921 - Colmore Cup; Victory Cup; London-Land's End; A.C.U. Centre; London-Manchester; Travers Trial; London-Holyhead; London-Edinburgh; Moffat Cup; Reliability Trial; Sheffield-Holyhead; Reliability Trial; Reliability Trial; Sheffield-Hunstanton; A.C.U. 6 days; Nailsworth Ladder; London-Exeter; London-Gloucester
- 1922 - Colmore Cup; General Efficiency; Stock Trial; Victory Cup; One Day Reliability; London-Land's End; London-Holyhead; Reliability Trial; Reliability Trial; Open Reliability Trial; Vesey Cup Trial; London-Edinburgh; Sheffield 24 hours; A.C.U. Midland; M.C. & A.C. 24 hrs; A.C.U. 6 days; Cannock and Walsall Reliability; A.C. & N.B.A.C. Hill Climb; A.C. & N.B.A.C. Shell Cup; Midland Car Club

== Surviving models ==
There is reportedly only one model still surviving, at the Black Country Living Museum at Dudley.

== See also ==
- List of car manufacturers of the United Kingdom
