= J. A. Prestwich Industries =

English manufacturing company

J. A. Prestwich Industries Limited
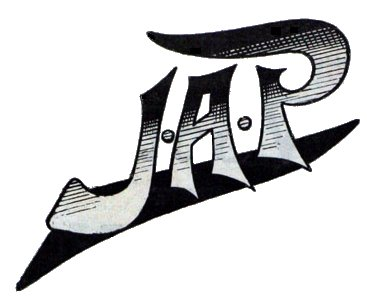
- Industry: Engineering and pencil manufacturing
- Predecessor: J. A. Prestwich and Company Limited and Pencils Limited
- Founded: 1951
- Defunct: 1964
- Successor: Villiers Engineering
- Headquarters: Tariff Road, Northumberland Park, London
- Key people: John Alfred Prestwich
- Products: Industrial and motorcycle engines, pencils

J. A. Prestwich Industries, was a British engineering equipment manufacturing company named after founder John Alfred Prestwich, which was formed in 1951 by the amalgamation of J. A. Prestwich and Company Limited and Pencils Ltd.

== History ==
John Prestwich, an engineer, began manufacturing scientific instruments in 1895, when he was 20. Initially operating behind his father's house at 1 Lansdowne Road, Tottenham, London, by 1911 he had moved to new premises in Tariff Road, within the Northumberland Park area of Tottenham, London. Prestwich was initially best known for his cinematography cameras and projectors. He worked with S.Z. de Ferranti and later the cinema pioneer William Friese-Greene.

Circa 1902 J. A. Prestwich and Company began manufacturing motorcycle engines which were used in many motorcycle marques. The motorcycle engines were associated with racing and record success and were used in speedway bikes into the 1960s. Prestwich also made engines for aeroplanes. In 1919 Prestwich formed Pencils Limited to exploit his invention of new machinery to make Master Pencils, also in Tariff Road. In the 1930s engine production increasingly focused on small industrial and agricultural engines. During WWII Prestwich produced around 240,000 industrial petrol engines in support of the war effort, together with millions of aircraft parts, fuses, etc.

In 1951 the assets of J. A. Prestwich and Company Limited and Pencils Ltd were taken over by J. A. Prestwich Industries Limited, which was registered on 23 April 1951 and floated on the London Stock Exchange shortly after. By 1957 practically all the shares in the company had been acquired by Villiers Engineering Company Limited of Wolverhampton, which also made motorcycle and industrial engines. The engineering works in Northumberland Park closed in 1963 and J. A. Prestwich Industries Limited was liquidated in 1964.

Papers, photographs and publicity material relating to the company are held at the Bruce Castle Museum, Tottenham and the Science Museum Library & Archives at the Science Museum at Wroughton.

== Products ==
=== Motorcycles ===
From 1903 to 1908 complete motorcycles were produced from the development of the first overhead valve motorcycle engine to be produced in the UK.

After that the factory concentrated on supplying its engines to other manufacturers, including Brough Superior, Triumph Motorcycles, A. J. Stevens & Co. Ltd, Enfield Cycle Co, Hazlewoods Limited, Zenith Motorcycles, Grindlay Peerless and HRD Motorcycles (the forerunner of Vincent Motorcycles), and the AJS Model D, fabricated for the Russians in the First World War.

JAP exported significant numbers of engines to foreign motorcycle manufacturers including Dresch and Terrot in France, and Ardie, Hecker and Tornax in Germany.

Latterly, JAP engines (under Villiers control) were used in motorcycle racing, and most commonly speedway or dirt track. Various enthusiasts continued development of the engine into the 1970s primarily for grass track, speedway and long track use. Variants included the use of 4 valve heads, twin spark plugs and early electronic ignition systems. Some were modified to run as alcohol fuelled engines primarily for speedway use. All the engines were 4 stroke. Use of the engine declined in the 1970s as competing engines from Jawa-CZ and Weslake were developed giving better performance.

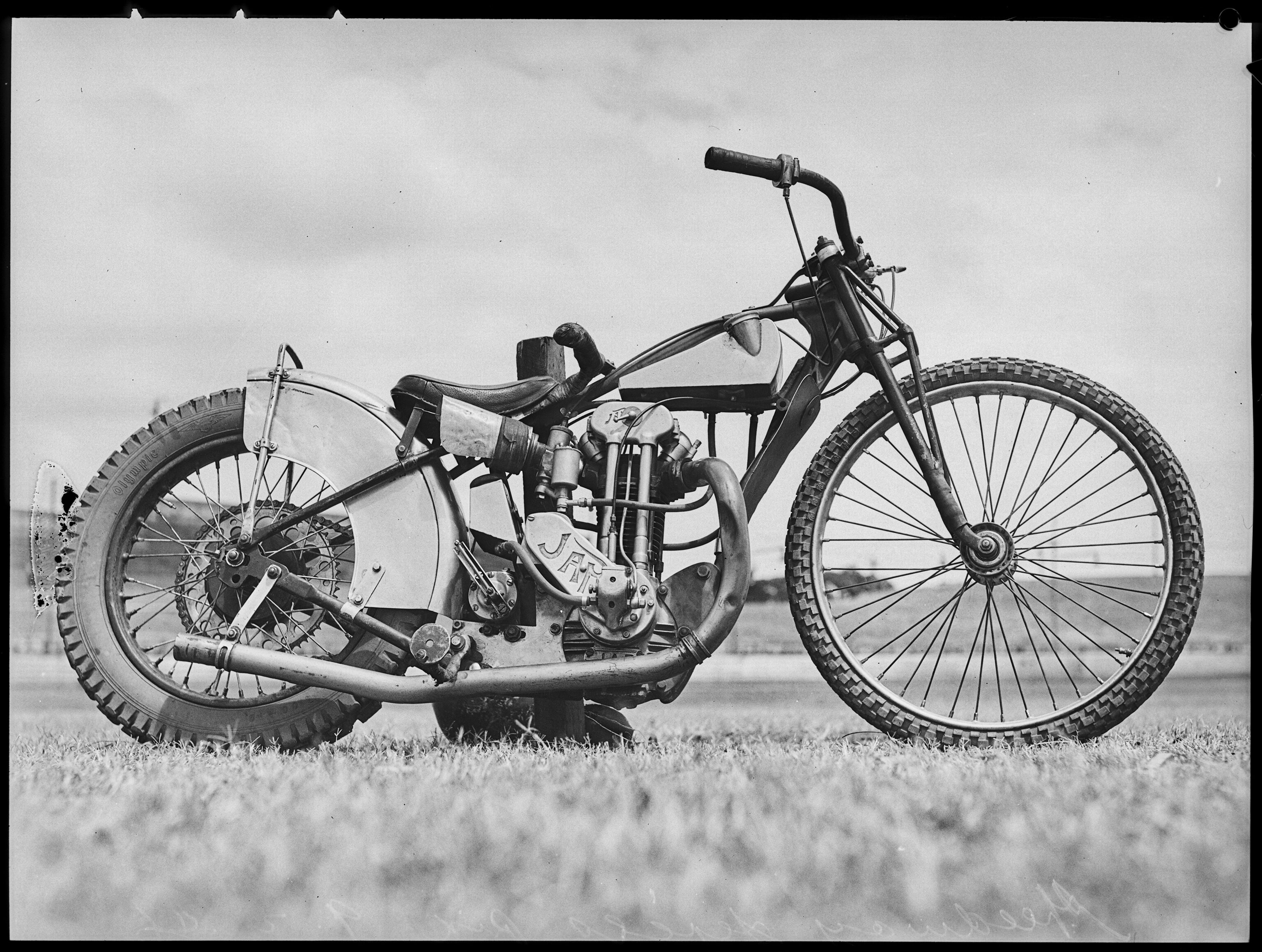
J. A. Prestwich 'Jap' speedway bike, Sydney, 9 February 1946.

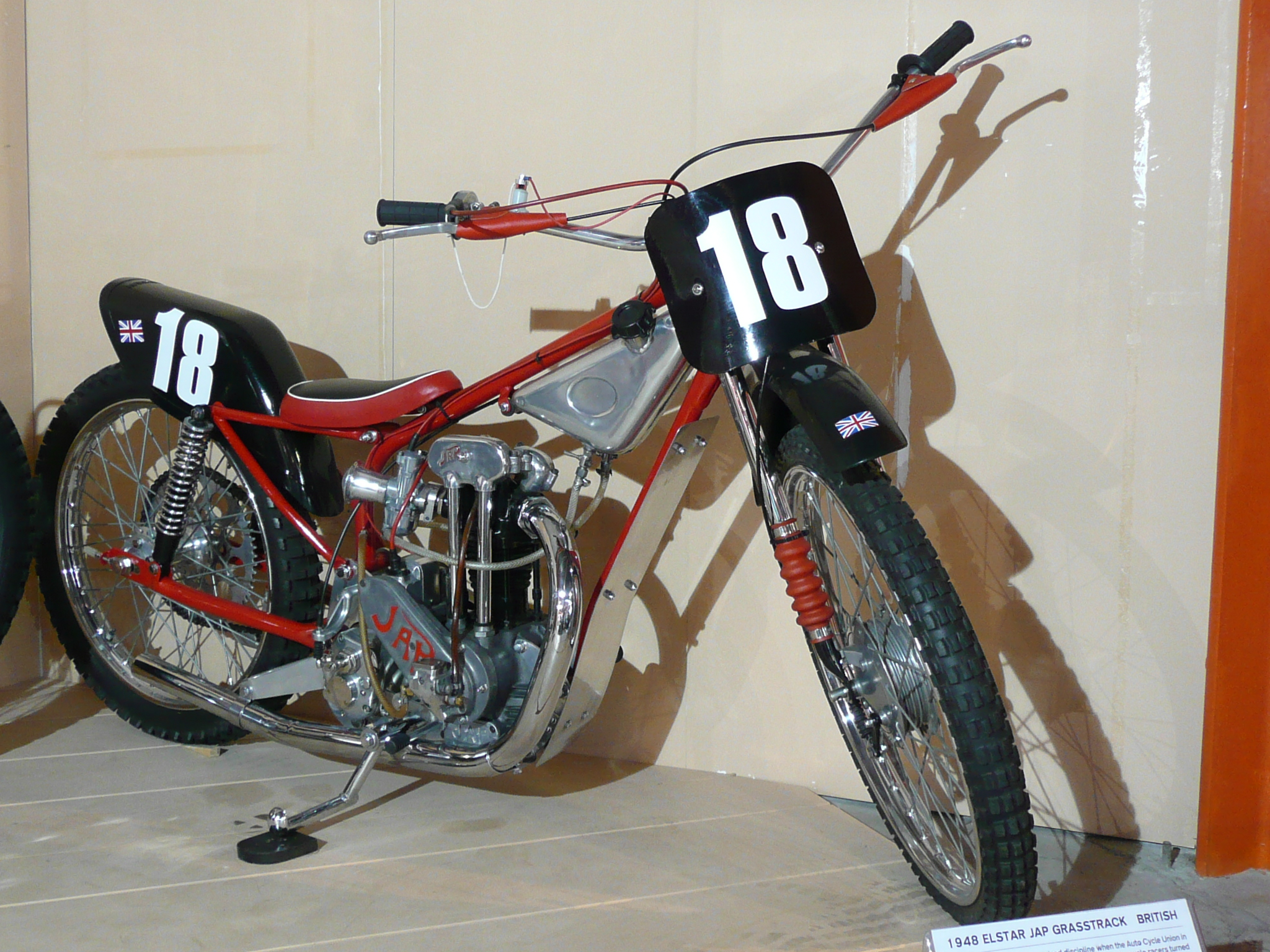
1948 Elstar JAP Grasstrack, National Motor Museum Monorail

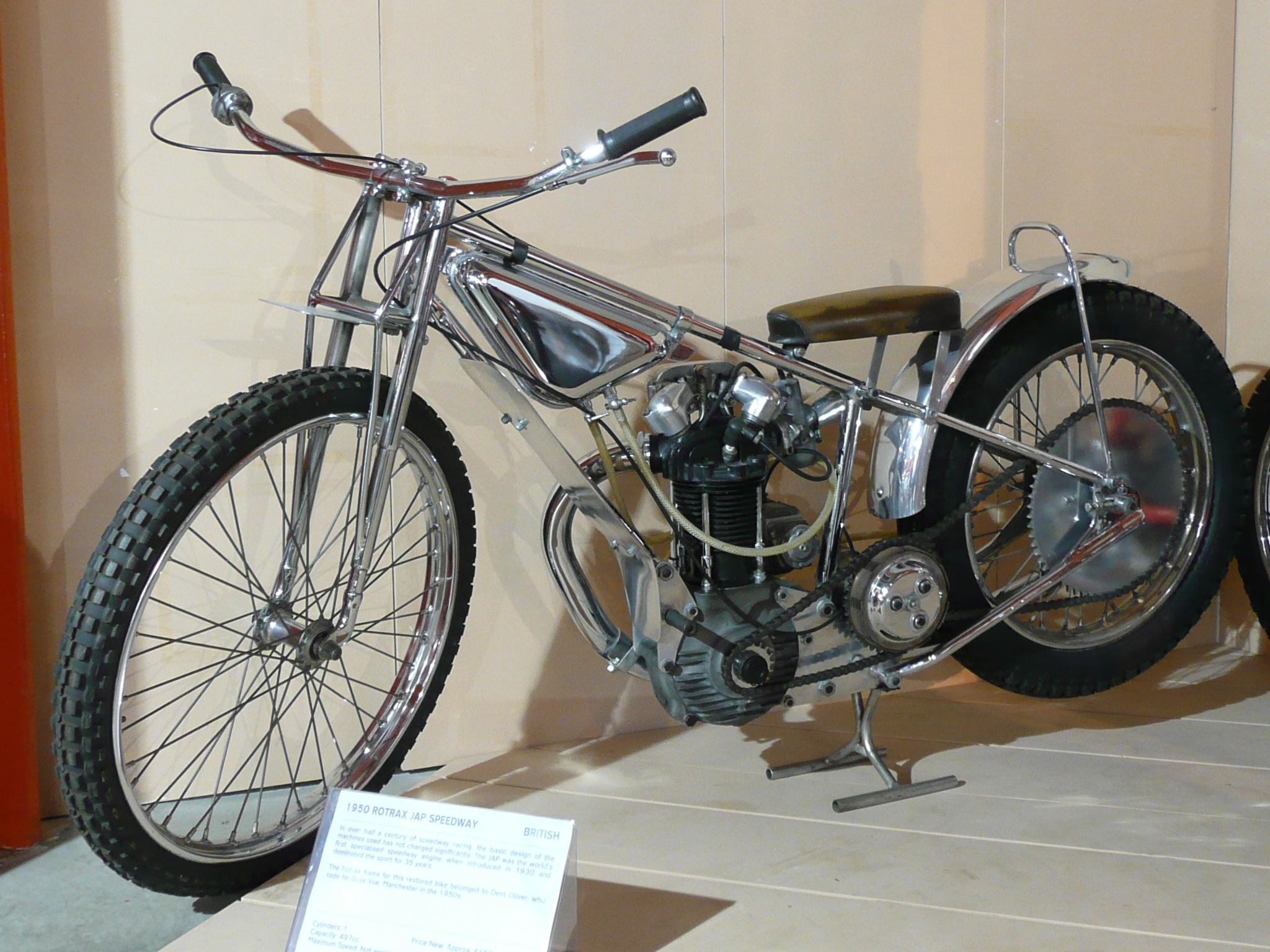
1950 Rotrax JAP Speedway, National Motor Museum Monorail

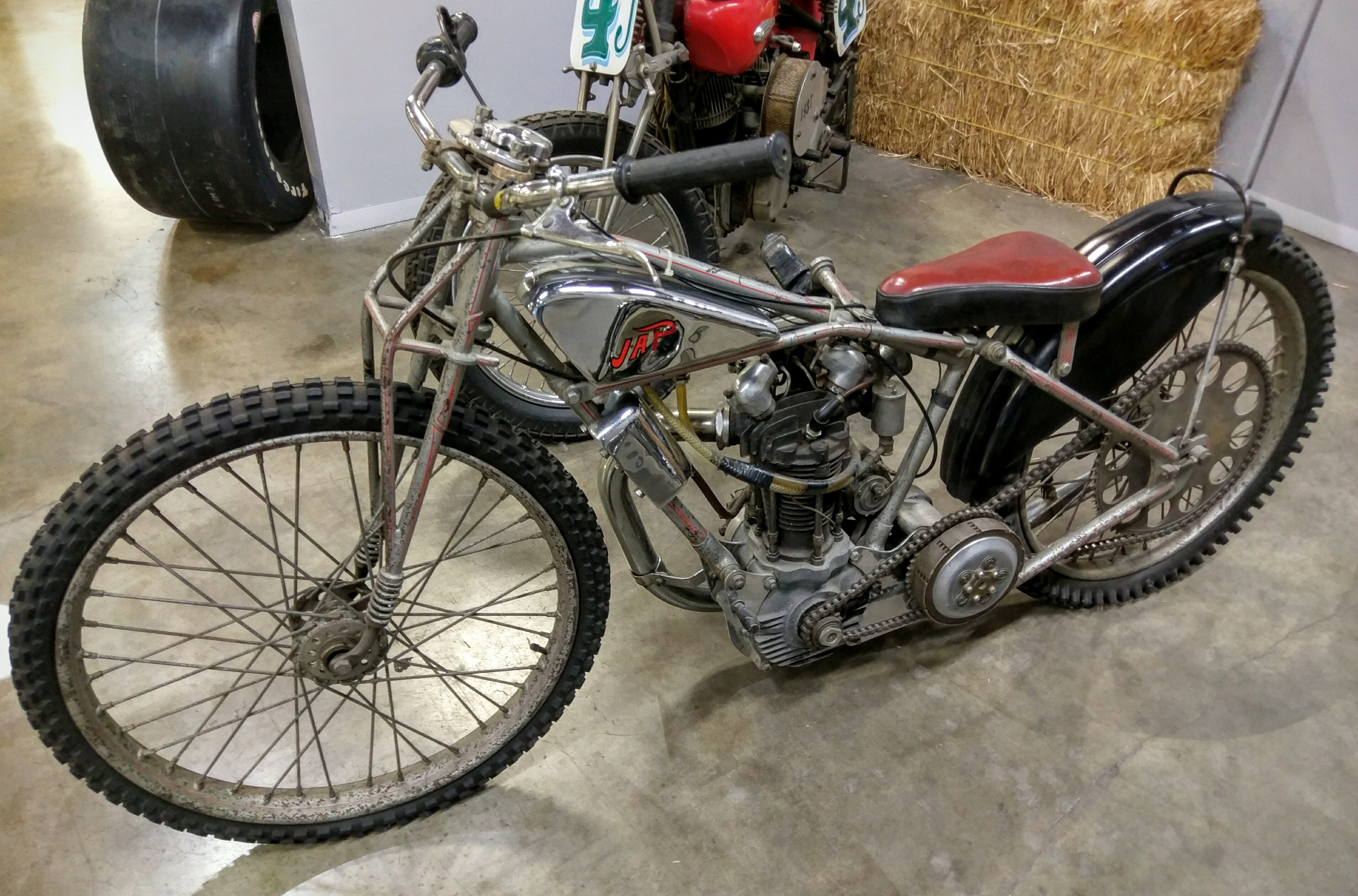
1948 J.A.P. Speedway Racer, California Automobile Museum

=== Aircraft engines ===
Early aircraft were light and basic, and needed a reliable lightweight engine for power. JAP motorcycle engines were often used in this application. A JAP engine was originally fitted in A V Roe's 1909 triplane, regarded as the first all-British aircraft, and for a while Prestwich and Roe had a partnership. J. A. Prestwich at first would deliver the same engine to the aircraft manufacturer, allowing them to make local modifications – mainly larger venturi tubes for the carburettor, to allow for greater air intake at altitude. In the late 1920s and early 1930s J. A. Prestwich produced various heavier engines under licence, including those for the UK market for Aeronca.

=== Motorcar engines ===
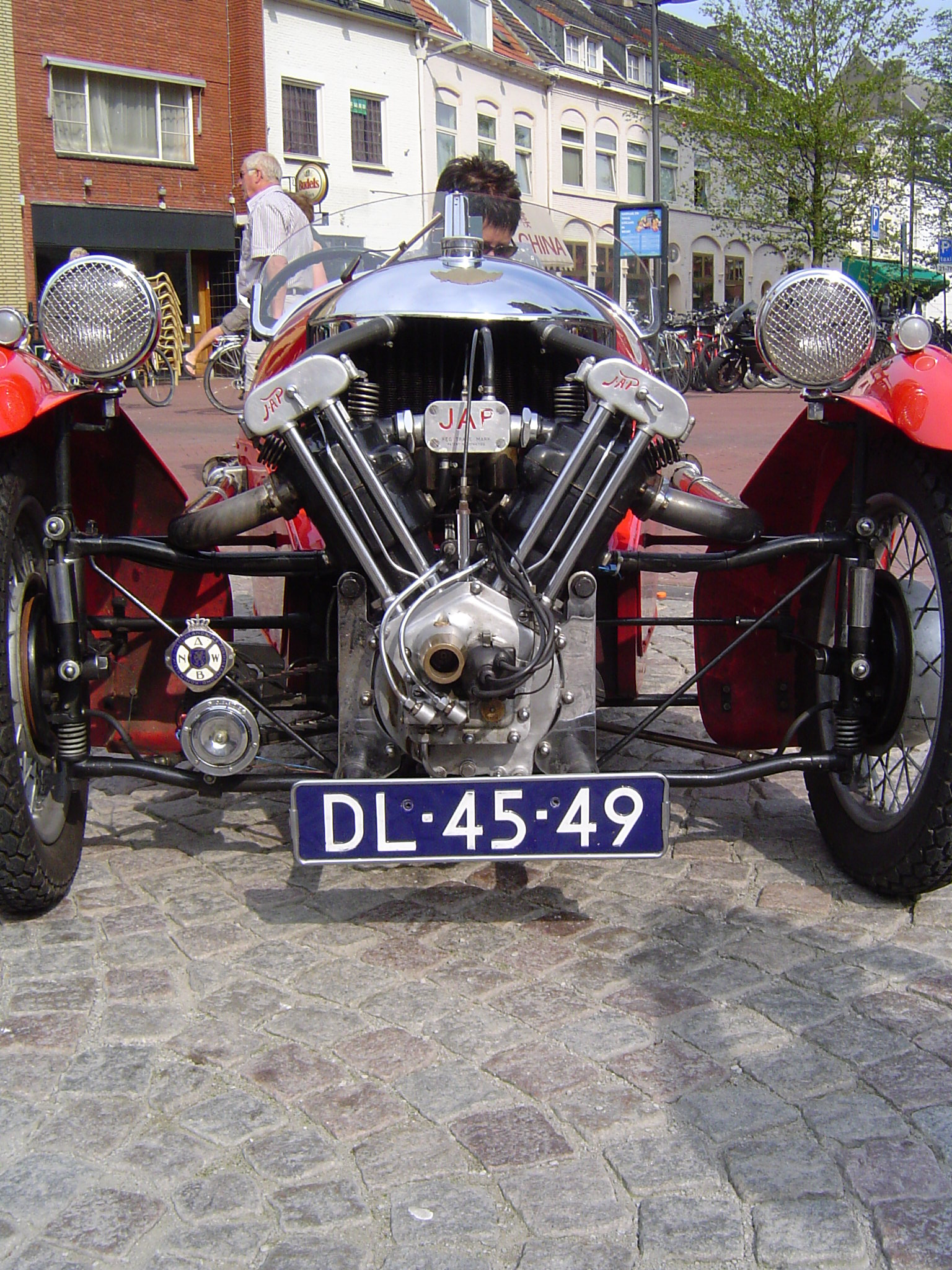
1934 Morgan Super Sport with JAP engine

JAP engines were extensively used in cyclecars in the 1910 to 1914 period when they were popular with small manufacturers. In 1914 JAP announced a new engine made specifically for the cyclecar: a V-twin of 90mm bore and 85mm stroke (1082cc). The engine had a larger flywheel than the motorcycle engine and an enclosed magneto drive. The engine was illustrated fitted to a Morgan three-wheeler.

In light of JAP's development of high-powered light engines for speedway, some low volume pre-war car manufacturers, including G.N., T.B., Morgan Motor Company and Reliant, used JAP engines to power some of their vehicles.

This use of the JAP extended into motor racing after WWII. Most were used in specialist UK lightweight formulas, or more extensively in Formula 3 and Formula 2 racing and in hillclimbing after developments by John Cooper. Cooper cars powered by JAP engines won the British Hill Climb Championship for eleven consecutive years.

In its later life, J. A. Prestwich produced components for other vehicle manufacturers, including the cylinder head for the Lotus Cortina and the early versions of the Ford-based Lotus Elan engine.

=== Film production and projection ===
Cinematographic equipment including cameras, printers, mutoscopes, cutting and perforating machines, and projectors, such as the Bioscope projectors for the Warwick Trading Company and Charles Urban, were produced by the company in the early part of the 20th century.

=== Railway trolleys ===
Early models of the railway maintenance ganger's Wickham trolley, from 1948, used a vee-twin JAP engine. This drove through a large flat flywheel and a friction drive. In the 1950s other Wickham trolleys used the 600 cc JAP engine and drove through a clutch, tail shaft and bevel drive.

=== Utility engines ===
J. A. Prestwich also made small utility engines under the JAP name for a variety of uses, both stationary and in motorised equipment. They ranged in size from the smallest model 0 two-stroke engine to the much larger type 6 engine, and were used on rotovators, generating sets, milking sets, water pumps, lawnmowers, hay elevators and other agricultural machines. Most were 4-stroke; they were quite reliable, and examples can still be seen at vintage rallies around Britain.

While most of the engines bore the JAP name, some, such as the model 3 OHV engine made for Arthur Lyon & Co for their ALCO generator sets, had timing covers with the name ALCO Featherweight cast in.

J.A.P. also had a factory in Chelmsford Road, Southgate, London, employing 40 to 50 people, where these engines were being made in 1955.

== See also ==
- Lister Auto-Truck
- Lympne light aircraft trials
