= Lister D =

Stationary engine

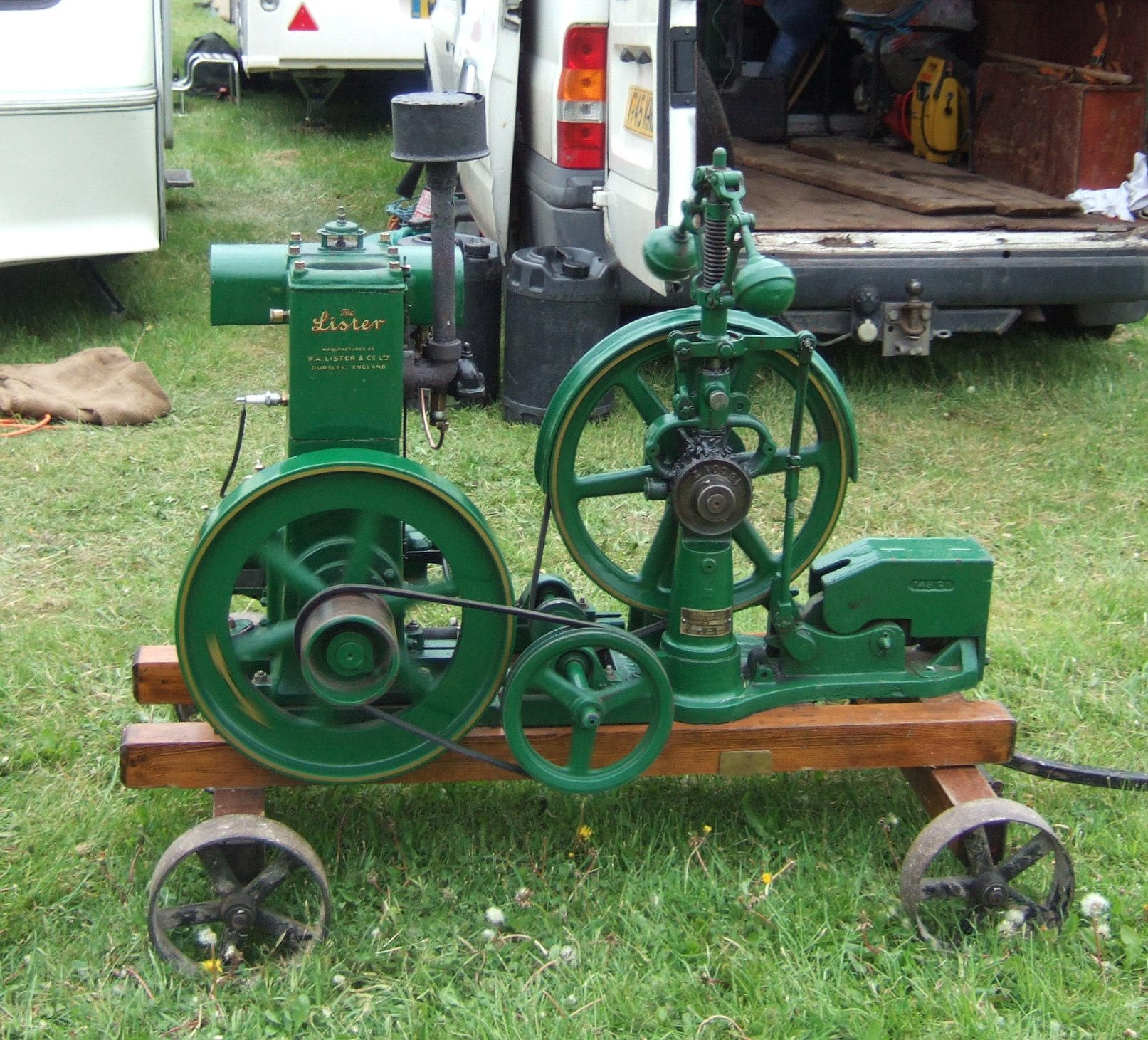
Lister D

The Lister D is a 1 - 2.5hp stationary engine fuelled by petrol or petrol/paraffin built between 1926-1965 by R A Lister and Company of Dursley. It replaced the Lister H, which was of a similar output. The first Lister D engine, serial number 80,000, was assembled on 26 October 1926.

The engine was a 4-stroke poppet valve engine with a simple centrifugal governing system. It had a chain drive ignition magneto, either the Lucas SR1, the Lucas RS1 or a M-l MK1 (shaft-driven and early chain-driven), and an Amal float bowl.

The engines were made in 1 hp, 1.5 hp, 2 hp and 2.5 hp versions. They were used to power water pumps, generators, cement mixers and much more.

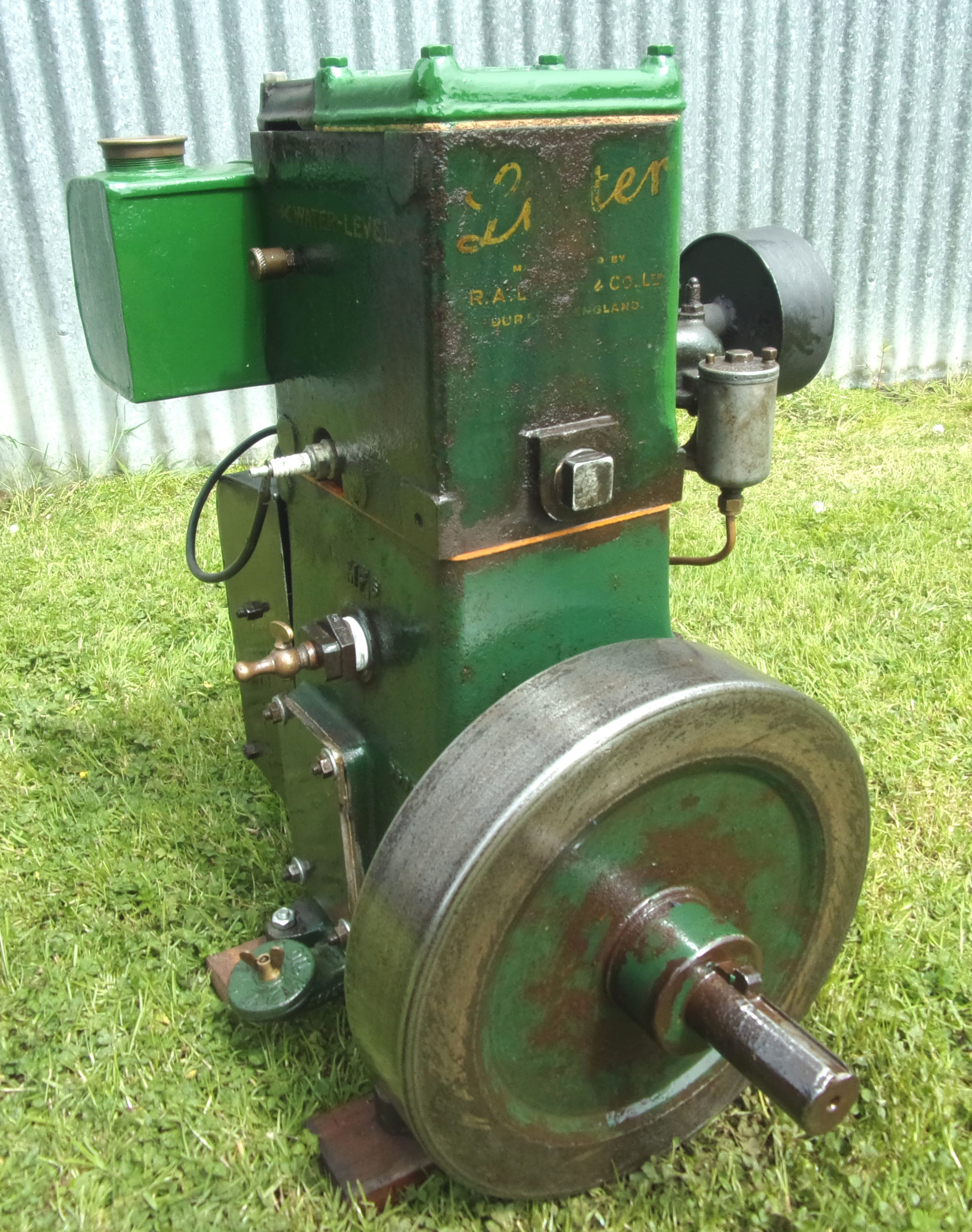
Preserved Lister Type D 1.5HP

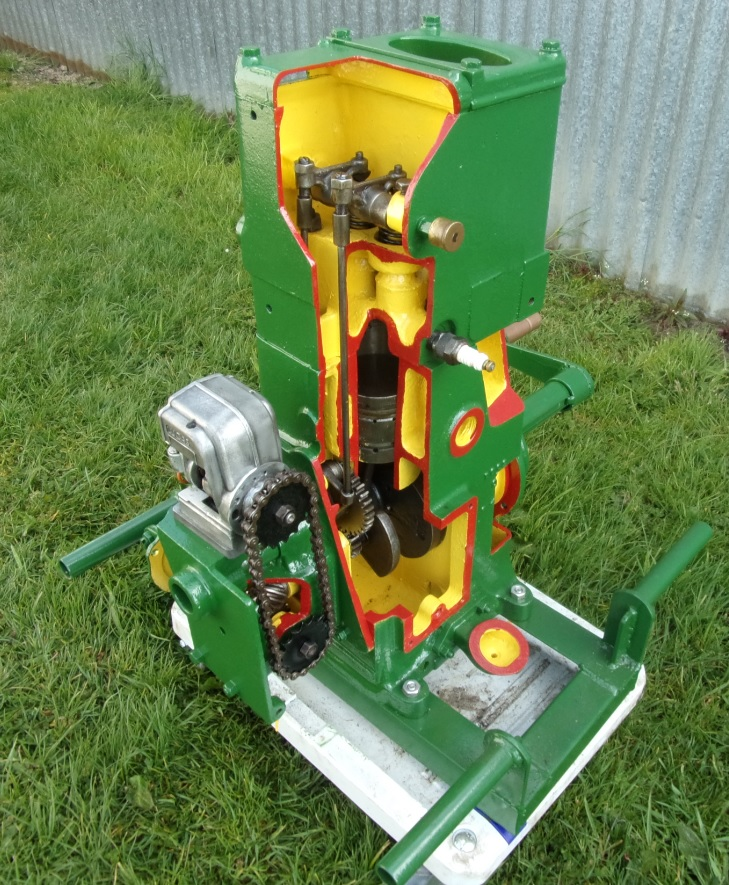
1954 Sectioned Lister D

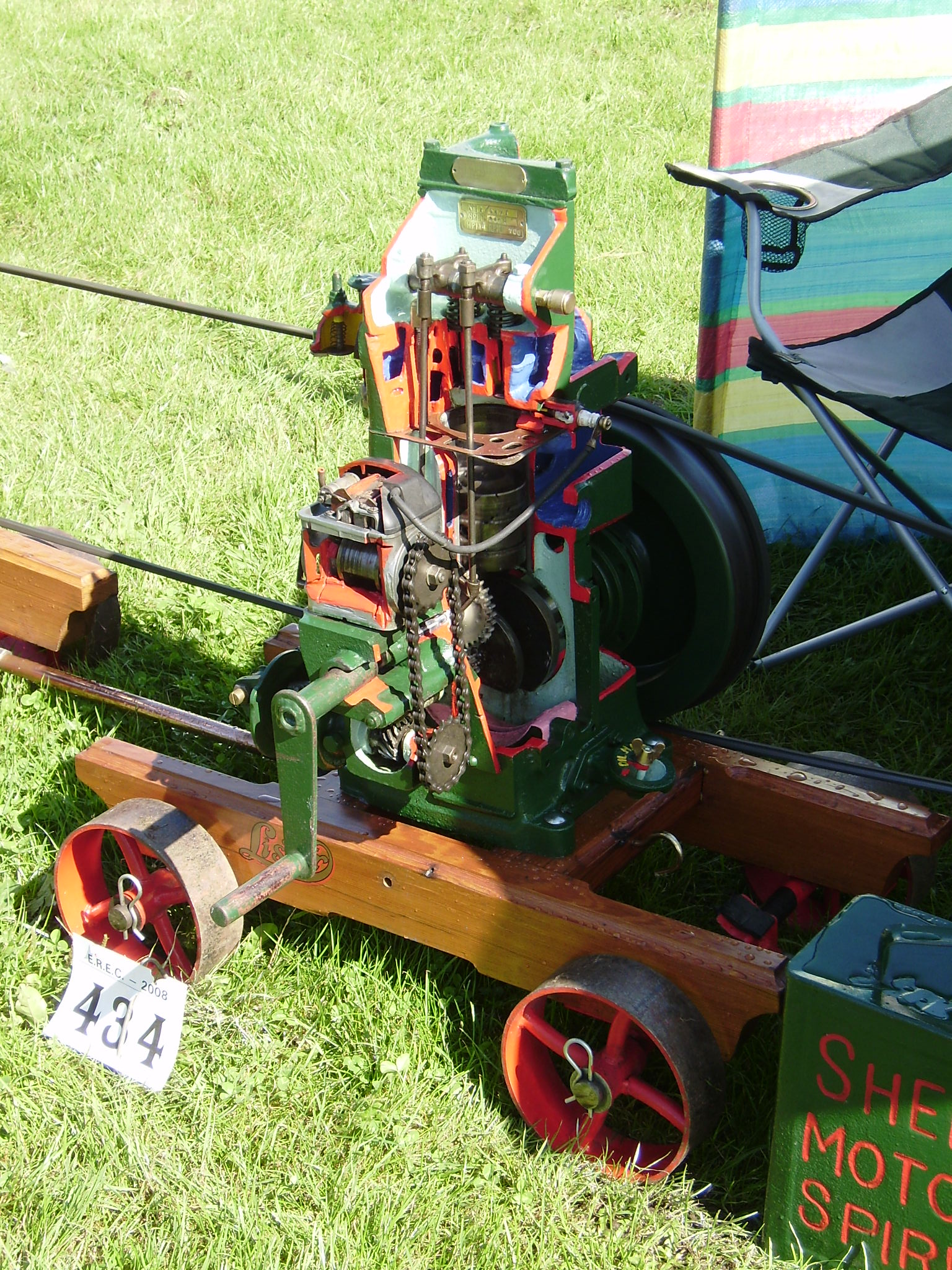
Sectioned Lister D

Throughout the years of production, the design of the engine changed very little. The fuel tank was moved from halfway up the engine to the top, and the shaft-drive magneto was replaced by a chain-driven unit in the early 1930s. The engines were originally painted mid Brunswick green, but some World War II engines were painted in olive drab. A paraffin-fuelled engine was available, called the Lister DK. It had two tanks: one for paraffin and one for petrol. This engine was started on petrol but could cut over to paraffin by means of a 3-way tap.

The engine used clockwise rotation as a standard, but some anti-clockwise engines were produced. They were very sturdy, reliable engines, but they did have a few flaws, one of which was that the water tap poured water over the oil filler. This was easily corrected by the use of a rubber pipe.

The engine in the early days was a rival to the Ruston Hornsby PB, the Bamford EV1 and the short-lived Fowler P series

It is popular with newcomers to the stationary engine hobby; un-restored examples are available for as little as £25; plenty of spares and various re-manufactured parts and decals are available.
