= Lister Housing Co-operative =

Lister Housing Co-operative Limited
- Trade name: Lister Housing Co–operative
- Type: Housing co-operative
- Industry: Housing
- Founded: 1976 in Edinburgh, Scotland
- Headquarters: Edinburgh, Scotland
- Revenue: £708,000 (2013)
- Total assets: £2.7m (2013)
- Members: 256
- Number of employees: 5
- Website: lister.coop

Lister Housing Co-operative is a 185 flat housing co-operative and registered social landlord in Edinburgh's Old Town.

== Properties ==
The co-operative is in a strong financial position, having long bought their properties outright. The properties are located within the UNESCO World Heritage Site and are mostly Category B listed buildings. They are maintained to a high standard through working closely with Historic Scotland.

== Legal structure ==
The co-operative's Management Committee are all tenants and have had training and support to run this organisation which has a turnover of almost £750,000. The co-operative is a Registered Society under the Co-operatives and Community Benefit Societies Act 2014, a former Industrial & Provident Society (IPS) regulated by the Scottish Housing Regulator and the Financial Conduct Authority.

== History ==
Established in 1976, Lister was Scotland's first co-operative registered social landlord, providing social housing. The co-operative was formed to prevent a block of historic Georgian tenements on Lauriston Place, Heriot Place and Keir Street from planned demolition by the University of Edinburgh, as part of the University's substantial expansion programme at the time.

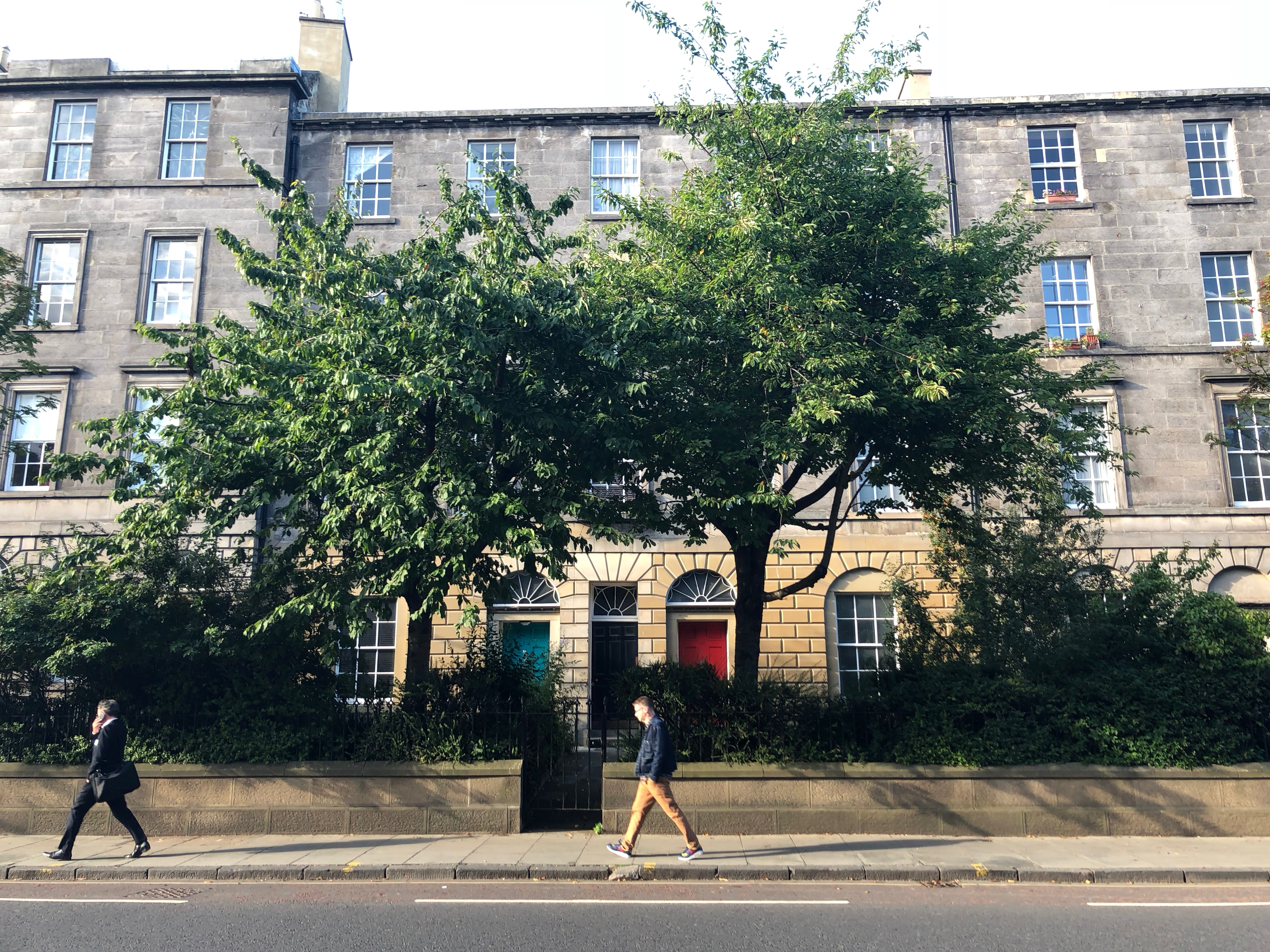
A view of several typical Lister properties on Lauriston Place.

Opposition to the planned demolition led to persuading the Council's Planning Committee to not re-zone the site from housing to education uses, which the University lost. It was agreed that Lister would take over the tenements, and with the help of the former Edinvar Housing Association, renovated them between 1978-82 to provide 135 flats.

When similar blocks on the south side of Lauriston Place, between Lauriston Terrace and Archibald Place, were threatened with demolition in the mid-80s by the Royal Infirmary of Edinburgh, Lister fought again with others to save those blocks and again won. They were renovated to provide 50 high quality flats.
