= Lister (given name) =

Lister or Lyster is a masculine given name which may refer to:

- Sir Lister Holte, 5th Baronet (1720–1770), English Member of Parliament
- Lyster Hoxie Dewey (1865–1944), American botanist
- Lyster Kirkpatrick (1885–1921), Australian rules footballer
- Lister Lea (1809–1905), a partner in the English architectural firm James & Lister Lea
- Lister Tonge (born 1951), Roman Catholic Transitional Deacon and former British Anglican vicar

== See also ==
- W. Lister Lister (1859–1943) Australian painter
