= Lister Hospital =

Lister Hospital can refer to:

- Lister Hospital, Stevenage, an NHS hospital on the outskirts of Stevenage, Herefordshire, England
- Lister Hospital, Chelsea, a private hospital in London

== See also ==
- Lister Institute of Preventive Medicine, the precursor to the Lister Hospital, Chelsea
