= R A Lister and Company =

British manufacturer of agricultural machinery

R.A. Lister & Company Ltd
- Type: Private
- Industry: Manufacturing
- Founded: 1867
- Founder: Sir Robert Ashton Lister
- Defunct: 1986
- Fate: Taken over / Merged
- Successor: Hawker Siddeley, Lister Petter
- Headquarters: Dursley, Gloucestershire, England
- Area served: Worldwide
- Key people: Charles Ashton Lister
- Products: Engines
- Parent: Hawker Siddeley (1965–1999)
- Subsidiaries: Blackstone & Co

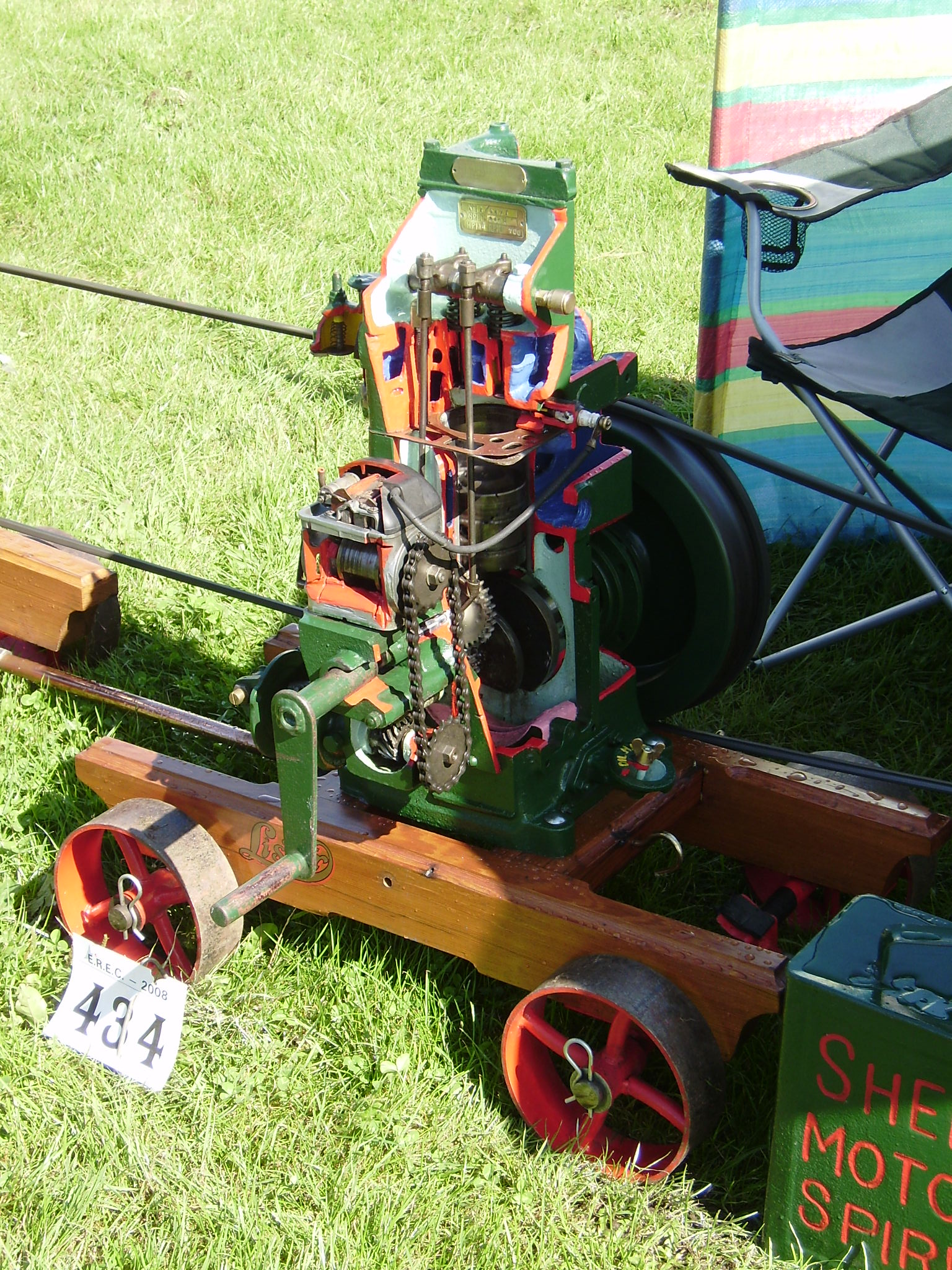
A sectioned Lister Engine

R A Lister & Company was founded in Dursley, Gloucestershire, England, in 1867 by Sir Robert Ashton Lister (1845–1929), to produce agricultural machinery. In 1986 it was bought and merged. In 2014, after 147 years, residual assembly production moved to Hardwicke, Stroud.

== History ==
=== 1867–1906: Foundation and growth ===
The founder of R A Lister and Company was Robert Ashton Lister, who was born in 1845. He led the exhibit of the family's products to the Paris Exhibition of 1867, but on return fell out with his father, and in the same year founded R.A.Lister and Company in the former Howard's Lower Mill, Water Street in Dursley to manufacture agricultural machinery.

In 1889 Robert acquired the UK rights to manufacture and sell Danish engineer Mikael Pedersen's new cream separator, which through a spinning centrifugal separator allowed the machine to run at a constant speed and hence create a regular consistency of cream. Marketed in the UK and British Empire as "The Alexandra Cream Separator", its success resulted in Pedersen moving to Dursley. In 1899, he founded the Dursley Pedersen Cycle Company with Ashton Lister. Robert was a pioneer of business in Western Canada, and took the first cream separator in that region over the plains of Alberta in a journey made by horse buggy.

By the early 1900s, R.A. Listers had redesigned Pedersen's cream separator, expanded its lines of sheep shearing machinery, was producing milk churns and wooden barrels for butter, and from the off-cuts developed a successful line of wood-based garden furniture.

=== 1907–1928: Petrol engines ===
In 1909 the company acquired manufacturing rights from the London-based firm of F.C. Southwell & Co. for their design of petrol-driven engines (derived from the design of a range of imported engines made by the U.S. based Stover Manufacturing and Engine Company).

During World War I, the factory was focused solely on War Department production, producing petrol engines, lighting sets and munitions. Many of the men left for the front, meaning that a large portion of the workforce was female. After the war, Sir Robert Lister retired and turned management at Dursley over to his grandsons (sons of Charles Ashton Lister CBE) Robert, Frank, Percy and George together with A. E. Mellerup. Charles Ashton Lister managed the company's business in North America and was based in Canada. George managed home sales and Frank was in charge of buying, while Cecil did not have a clearly defined role at all, and, although Robert was the eldest, it was Percy (later Sir Percy) who had by far the most significant impact.

Developing foreign competition meant that the manufacturing of milk churns and barrels ceased, and the over supply of second-hand ex-military engines and lighting sets reduced the company's profit considerably. The company was eventually turned round under Percy's control, aided by the introduction in 1926 of the Lister Auto-Truck, used to move goods around factories, railway stations and dockyards the world over; production continued until 1973.

As managing director Percy led the firm through a period of significant growth and prosperity in the 1920s and 1930s. By 1926 the workforce was around 2000 and was growing rapidly; the company ran a 24-hour manufacturing operation, expanding its range of products and supplying retailers to around 6000 UK customers and many more worldwide. Retailing revenues were particularly healthy in Australia and New Zealand, where sheep-shearing equipment was in great demand.

=== 1929–1945: Diesel engines ===
In 1929, Sir Robert died at the age of 84, and in the same year the first of Lister's own design of "CS" (cold start) diesel engine was made. With one cylinder and producing 9 horsepower (6.7 kW), it became known as the Lister 9-1. This was quickly followed by the 5-1, 10-2, 18-2 and 38-4, all in 1930; the 27-3 in 1931; and 3-1, CD and CE in 1933. Lister engines were traditionally painted a mid-range shade of Brunswick Green, which continues to be used today by Lister Petter.

The CS is a slow-running (600 rpm) reliable engine, suitable for driving electric generators or irrigation pumps. CS type engines gained a reputation for longevity and reliability, especially in Commonwealth countries, to which they were widely exported. Some CS engines ran practically continuously for decades in agricultural, industrial and electrical applications.

By 1936 Lister was producing 600 engines across a range of 80 different sizes and types of diesel and petrol models, most of which were small at around 1.5 to 3 hp. These could be bought stand alone (many were used in the construction industry), or powering a complementary range of pumps, churns, cream separators, autotrucks, generating plant and sheep shearing equipment. The branded Woodware Works continued to produce ornamental tubs, garden seats and other ornamental garden furniture.

The company headquarters were in an early 16th-century Priory building in Dursley. In the nearby valley was located a foundry, together with a number of other workshops necessary for the production of engines and the various other products offered, including a machining shop, capstan lathe shop, engine assembly lines, and a coopers' shop. Many goods were shipped out from the nearby Dursley railway station, which was located on land leased from Lister.

During the late 1920s Sir Robert and Charles Ashton Lister had been responsible for trying to obtain payments of bad debts incurred by American and Canadian farmers during the Great Depression. Being sympathetic to their plight Charles suggested to Sir Robert that Listers should sue the banks for their money. Sir Robert was not impressed. However, Charles remained in Canada where he built up the North American business for Listers as well as pursuing other business opportunities on his own. He returned to England in about 1936 with his second wife, Doris Eleanor, and four new sons, Charles Owen, John, Frederick William and James Hugh. Although remaining the majority shareholder of Listers the running of the company was left in the hands of his first family led by Sir Percy.

Before going to North America Charles had been responsible for securing bad debt in Germany for R A Lister, during that country’s period of hyper-inflation. Always the pragmatist Charles settled debt at 40% of its value in marks. In order to try to protect the value of the funds repaid he invested in German property including a hotel in Bavaria of dubious repute. Charles saw at first-hand the rise of the Nazi Party and used the company's assets in Germany to assist those trying to rescue Jewish families from Germany and Austria by bribing officials. Charles had two Jewish daughters in Vienna whom he had been unable to rescue. However, back in England in 1939 he was able to get the Austrian governess (a Miss Simpkiss) of his second family to the continent. He and the rest of the family packed her suitcase with clothes in which they stuffed huge quantities of cash. This mission proved successful and all returned England just before the outbreak of World War II.

Listers had continued to flourish during the 1930s, riding the economic financial crisis and building on its many earlier successes. The Lister family, although not as highly religious as the Cadbury family or Terry's of York, had supplemented their workers' lifestyles through regular company-wide excursions. The firm was profitable in the 1930s, and able to provide town-wide medical services and a social club, which still exists.

The most successful Lister engine was the D-type engine, introduced in 1926, most versions of which were rated at 1.5 horsepower at 700 RPM. More than 250,000 'D' engines were built until 1964. They were used for a wide variety of light tasks such as pumping and small-scale electricity generation. The Lister 'D' is still one of the most widely seen vintage stationary engines in the UK. Hand-cranked Lister diesel engines were used in many early dumpers. Lister took over Blackstone & Co in 1937 to form Lister Blackstone.

The factory returned to war production at the onset of World War II, producing engines, lighting sets, agricultural implements and shell cases. HM Queen Mary, who spent much of the war at nearby Badminton House, toured the factory in 1940, and Lister increased war production by opening components and sub-assembly plants in Nympsfield (1942), Wotton-under-Edge (1943) and Cinderford (1944).

=== 1946–1965: Independent ===
After World War II, Lister bought Marine Mountings of Swindon from the Admiralty, which became the home of the D Type production till 1963 when the SR range became its main product, together with SL and LD models in 1-4 cylinder versions. Marine Mountings was closed in 19??.<5>

Having survived World War II, Lister continued to benefit from its reputation for durable, reliable high-quality engines, and its pedigree as an old-established firm. However labour costs in the post-war period made a return to the heyday of the 1920s and 1930s impossible. Competition from rivals such as Petter and from overseas were also factors to be contended with, and unauthorized copycat engines ("Listeroids") were produced in other countries.

=== 1967–1986: Purchase and merger ===
In 1965 following the death of Charles Ashton Lister CBE (1871 to 1965), Lister was acquired by Hawker Siddeley, who had bought its old rival Petter Diesels in 1957.

A large investment was made in 1966 when they also bought the old Gresham & Craven plant in Walkden, Lancashire. This plant had a large iron foundry, pattern shop and machine shop. It was reorganised to supply diesel engine parts that were previously bought from sub-contractors, including: cylinder heads, crankcases, flywheels, gearcases and a multitude of small parts for the parent plants. It also assembled moisture extraction units and the SR range of diesel generators employing 200-250 personnel until it was closed in 1971 because of a downturn in demand for diesel engines.<6>

=== 1986–2013: Lister Petter ===
In 1986 Hawker Siddeley merged Lister and Petter to form a new company, Lister Petter Ltd. However, the changed economic situation of the 1990s, combined with their main market of Asia now industrialising itself and producing far cheaper often copied products, led to a quickly declining market and resultant profit margin.

In 1992, Hawker Siddeley was acquired by BTR plc for £1.5bn. Burdened by debts after years of acquisition, in 1999 BTR merged with Siebe to form BTR Siebe plc, which was renamed Invensys plc. In preparation, BTR reviewed and decided to sell-off any subsidiary operations, which included Lister Petter. The shearing and accessories business was sold to a management buyout, the core large engine products were acquired by Deutz AG, and the residual small engines business was cut down to a profitable concern and sold in 1996 to Schroders Venture Capital.

In 2000, with Schroders looking to exit, the firm was bought through a £13.5M management buyout, enabled through selling the original 92-acre (37 ha) Lister factory site at Littlecombe, Dursley to the South West Regional Development Agency. By this time, the core engine products were in demise, and the company was employing around 250 people on a turnover of £35M. Cost-cutting measures included closing the award-winning foundry in 2001, which had been one of the most advanced in Europe when it opened in 1937.

In the early years of the 21st century, small, durable, reliable industrial and marine engines continued to be a staple, notably the ALPHA water-cooled industrial and marine engines (2-, 3- or 4-cylinder) and the "T" air-cooled series (1-, 2- or 3-cylinder). Engines and diesel generating sets continued to be assembled and sold from a factory on the original Dursley site, with the product range expanded to include more powerful engines and a wider range of generating set specifications. In 2007 a new heavy-duty engine, the OMEGA, offering up to 268 kW, was added to the company's product range.

=== 2014: Relocation ===
Sales continued to fall, and in 2003 the company fell into its first period of administration. Rescued through another SWRDA-backed management buyout, the second company survived a further three years before again collapsing into administration. On this occasion, the workers via Unite the Union voted to remain in Dursley, but the company's registered headquarters were moved to Hardwicke, south of Gloucester, 11 miles (18 km) away.

After SWRDC sold the original factory site for redevelopment to specialist St. Modwen Properties, the residual engineering group announced its intention in March 2013 to relocate from Dursley. In Autumn 2013, the company fell into a third period of administration. Rescued quickly through a pre-packaged administration - which avoided the company's legal obligations to pay the required 250 redundancy packages, which were instead paid by the Government - the company's association with Dursley ended in April 2014, when assembly production moved to Hardwicke, Stroud and the parts supply store to a former Royal Air Force hangar at Aston Down. The Lister Hall theatre in Dursley was formerly part of the social centre for the firm.

Although R A Lister ceased production of many of its well-known models many years ago, many of these engine are still in use today all over the world.

== Lister trucks and industrial locomotives ==
Lister also built light trucks fitted with their engines, for use around factories. From 1926 to 1968 they built light narrow gauge railway locomotives, weighing as little as 1½ tons, typically used by small brickworks and on peat bogs. The locos were often characterised by a total lack of bodywork; sometimes they had the luxury of an all over roof supported by four corner posts.

== In popular culture ==
Smallcreep's Day by Peter Currell Brown is a surrealist satire on modern industrial life. The 1965 novel was written while the author worked at R A Lister and Company, Dursley.

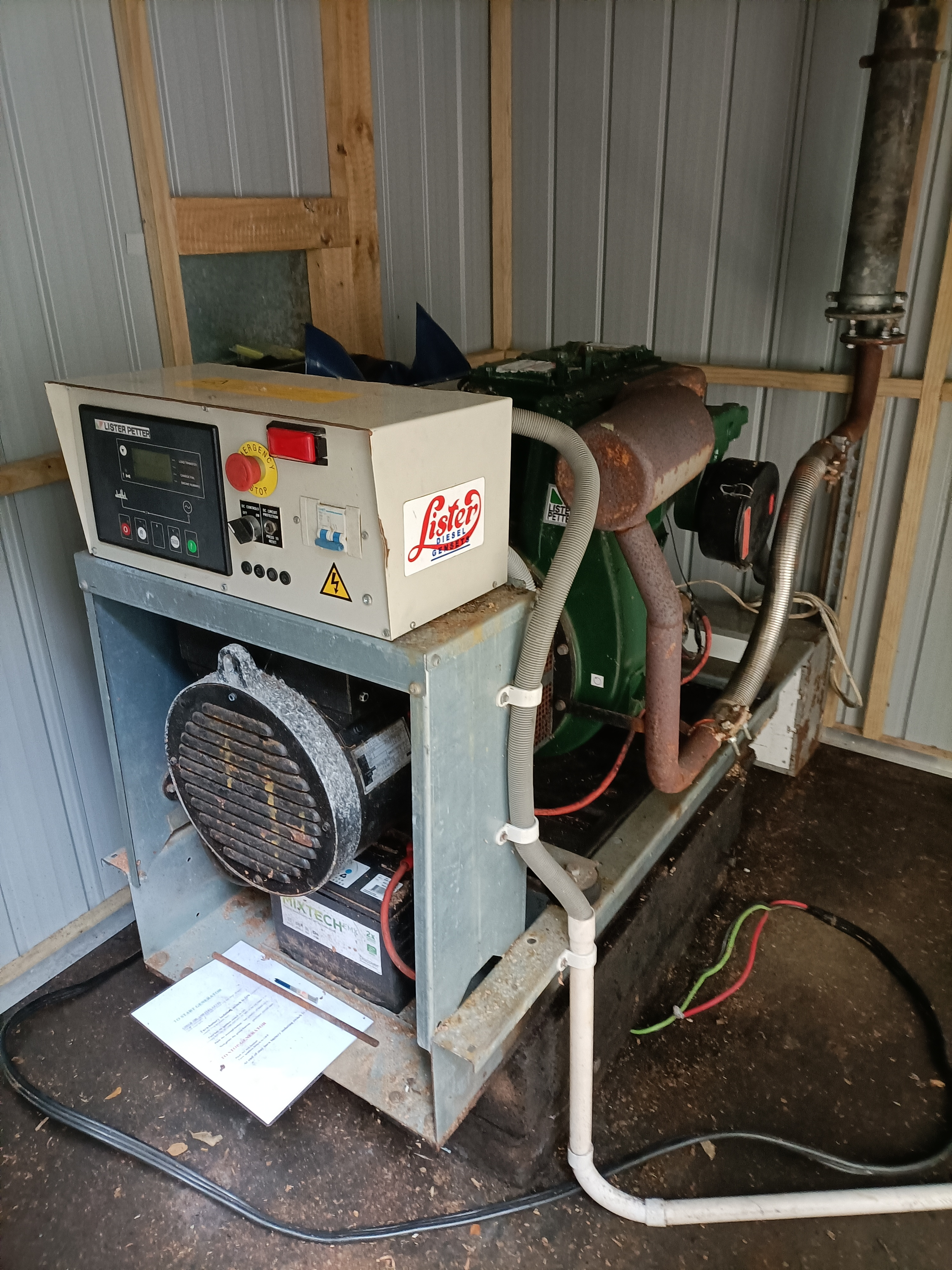

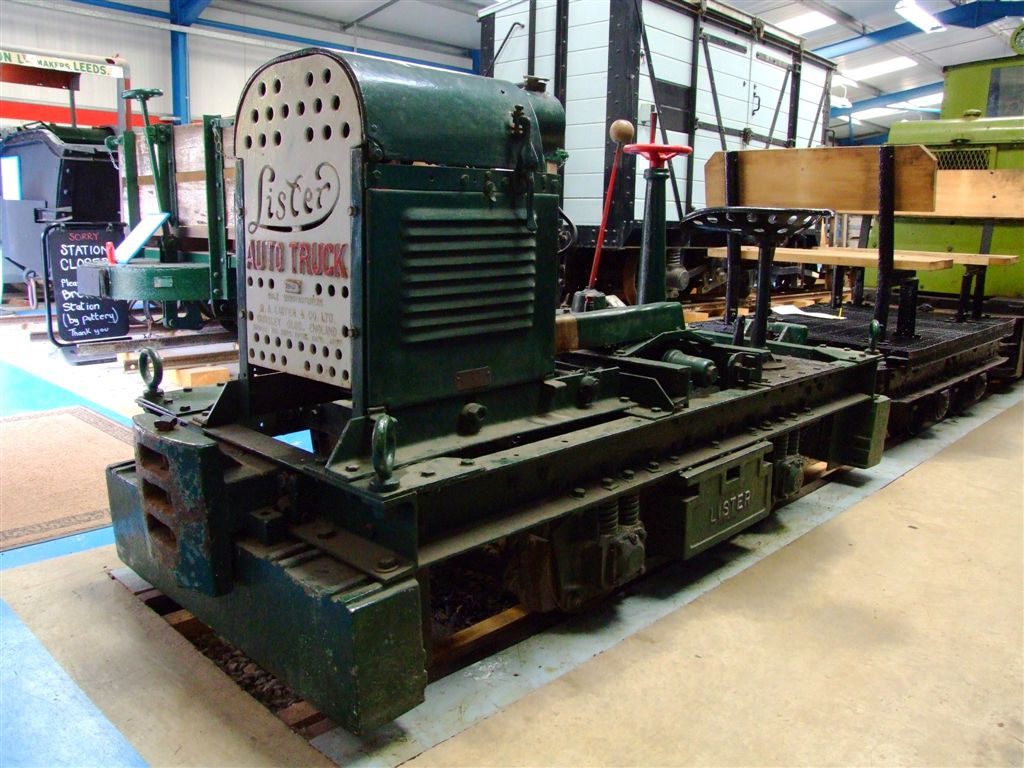
Lister Rail-Truck

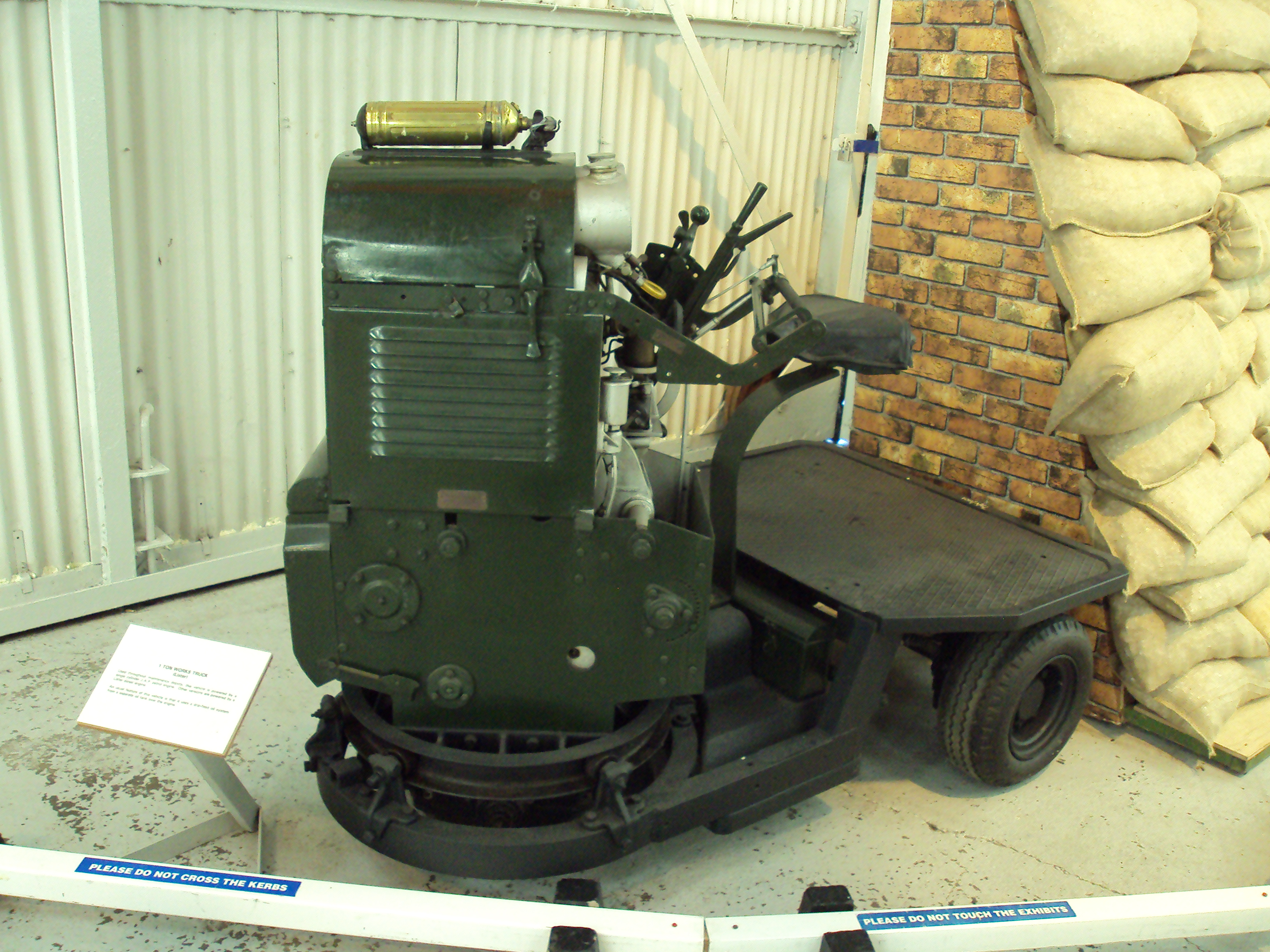
Lister 1 Ton works truck
