= Cotswold–Severn Group =

Series of long barrows in western Britain

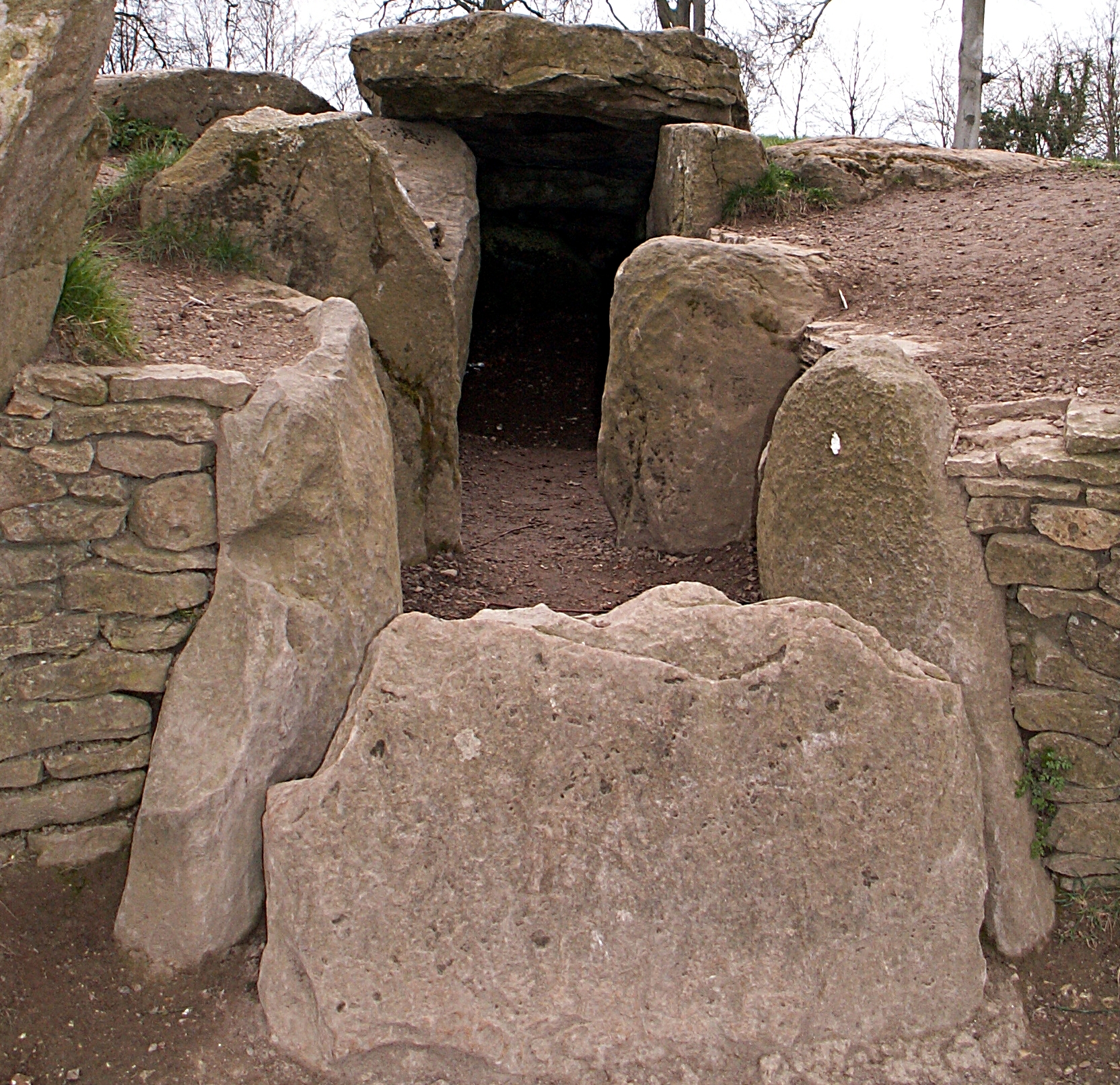
The exposed stone burial chambers of Wayland's Smithy long barrow, Oxfordshire, U.K.

The Cotswold–Severn Group are a series of long barrows erected in an area of western Great Britain during the Early Neolithic. Around 200 known examples of long barrows are known from the Cotswold–Severn region, although an unknown number of others were likely destroyed prior to being recorded.

== Definition ==
The concept of the "Cotswold–Severn group" was coined by 1937 by the archaeologist Glyn Daniel. They represent a regional grouping of long barrows, a broader architectural tradition found across Atlantic Europe. This tradition stretches from southeast Spain up to southern Sweden, taking in the British Isles to the west. Overall, about 40,000 long barrows are known to survive from the Early Neolithic across Europe. The long barrows are not the world's oldest known structures using stone—they are predated by Göbekli Tepe in modern Turkey—but they do represent the oldest widespread tradition of using stone in construction. The archaeologist Frances Lynch has described them as "the oldest built structures in Europe" to survive. Although found across this large area, they can be subdivided into clear regionalised traditions based on architectural differences, of which the Cotswold–Severn Group is one.

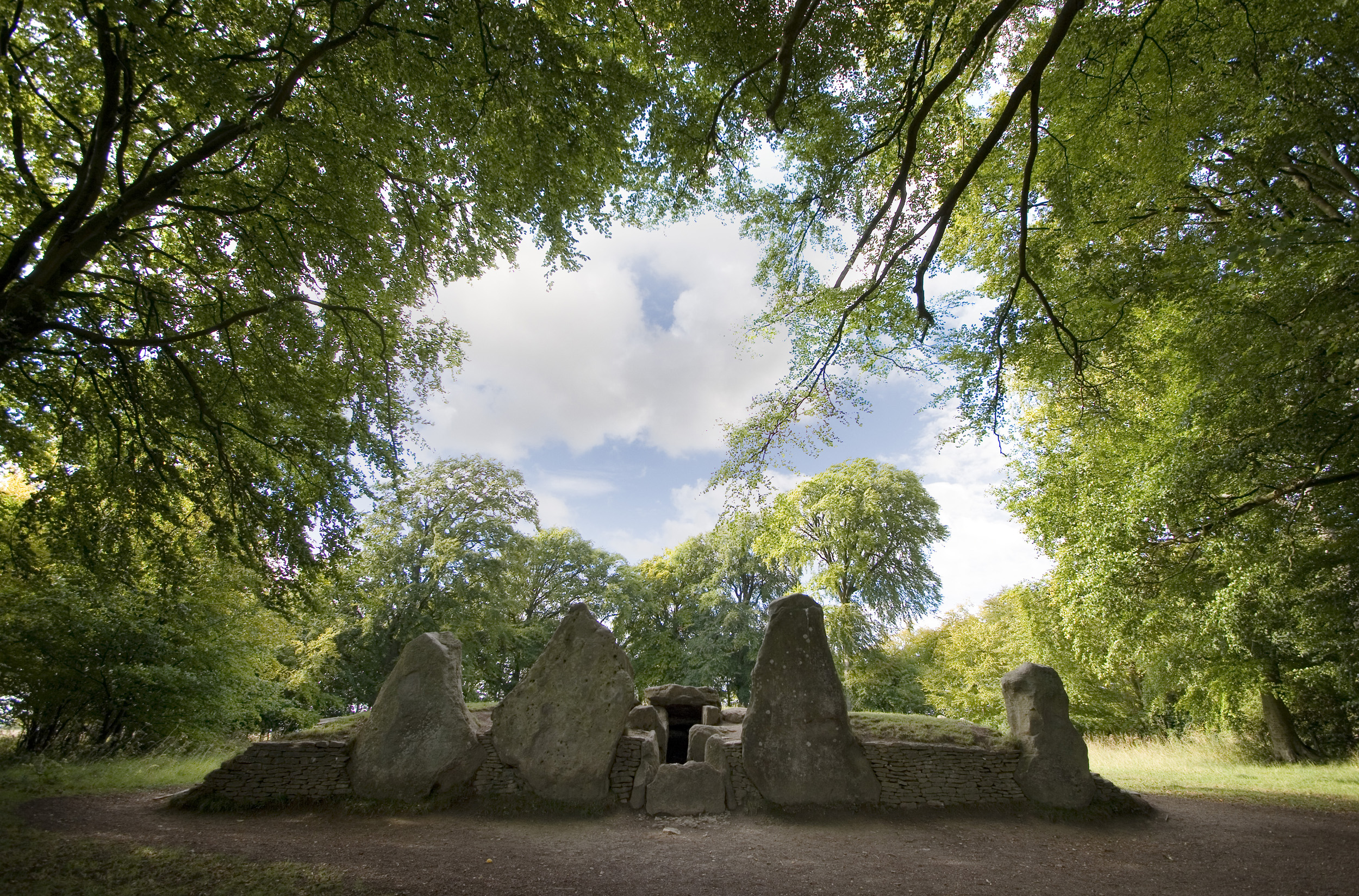
The entrance to Wayland's Smithy, one of the Cotswold-Severn Group in modern Oxfordshire.

The long barrow tradition originated somewhere in the area of modern Spain, Portugal, and western France; here, the long barrows were first erected in the mid-fifth millennium BCE. The tradition then spread north, along the Atlantic coast. It had reached Britain by the first half of the fourth millennium BCE, either soon after farming or in some cases perhaps just before it, and then moved into other parts of northern Europe, for instance arriving in the area of the modern Netherlands by the second half of the fourth millennium BCE. On the basis of dates ascertained from a number of excavations, Darvill argued that long barrows appeared in the Cotswolds-Severn region fairly abruptly around 3700 BCE. They continued to be built for about 600 years. By 2600 BCE, very few of them had chambers that remained in active use and many had been deliberately blocked up.

Within the Cotswolds–Severn area, there are around 200 known long barrows. An unknown number have been destroyed before ever having been recorded; at least ten of those that had been recorded have since been destroyed or lost. Over 140 long barrows are known within the Cotswolds area itself. In northern Wiltshire and in the Dorset chalk hills, the Cotswold–Severn Group of long barrows overlap with the style of earthen barrow found largely across the east of the island.

== Design ==
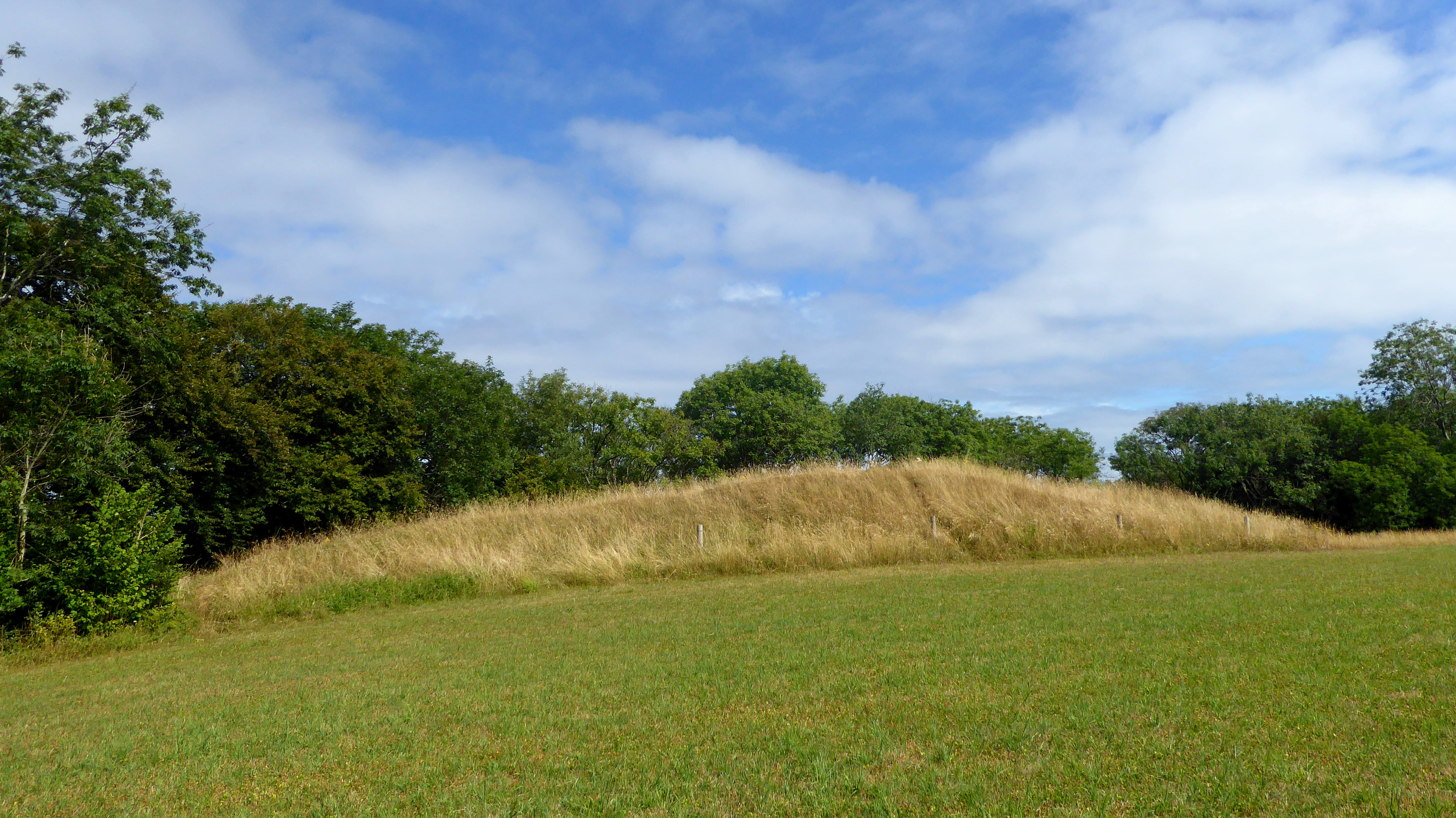
Uley Long Barrow, also known as "Hetty Pegler's Tump", in Gloucestershire

The choice of place in which the Cotswold–Severn long barrows were erected is unlikely to have been random.

Darvill noted that "when these sites were new, they were brutal and hard; bright white rocky mounds covering dark dank shadowy chambers."

== Funerary deposits ==
The Cotswold–Severn Group long barrows usually contained human bone in large quantities, with said barrows averaging the remains of between 40 and 50 individuals each. In some cases, the individual corpses may have been placed into the chamber whole and then left to decay inside; in others, the body may have been dismembered or excarnated outside the barrow before the bones were then placed into the chamber. Usually, the bones of different individuals were jumbled up within the chambers of the tomb, perhaps reflecting a deliberate decision to symbolically merge the individual with the collective dead. In some cases, the bones were segregated into different chambers within the tomb according to age or sex. In most cases, such deposits of human bone were made successively, at various intervals. It is also apparent that in some cases, select bones appear to have been removed from the chambers, perhaps for use in ritualised practices.

When entering the chambers to either add or remove new material, individuals would likely have been exposed to the smell of decaying corpses. It is unknown if entering this area was therefore seen by Early Neolithic Europeans as an ordeal to be overcome or an honourable job to be selected for.

In a few instances, other items were deposited in the chambers with the human bone. Such deposits included pottery, worked flint, pebbles, stone discs, beads, bone pins, dog bones, and most prominently, cattle bone. The deposition of animal bone—especially the skulls of cattle and pigs—was also a common recurring factor in the forecourts of the Cotswold-Severn long barrows. The purpose of these is not known; they may have represented totemic animals, have been seen as protective deposits, or been the remains of feasts.

== Meaning and purpose ==
While the purpose and meaning of these long barrows are not known, archaeologists have made suggestions on the basis of recurring patterns that can be observed within the tradition. Many archaeologists have suggested that this is because Early Neolithic people adhered to an ancestor cult that venerated the spirits of the dead, believing that they could intercede with the forces of nature for the benefit of their living descendants. It has furthermore been suggested that Early Neolithic people entered into the tombs—which doubled as temples or shrines—to perform rituals that would honour the dead and ask for their assistance. For this reason, the historian Ronald Hutton termed these monuments "tomb-shrines" to reflect their dual purpose. One study has concluded that these tombs were likely made for patrilineal kin groups.

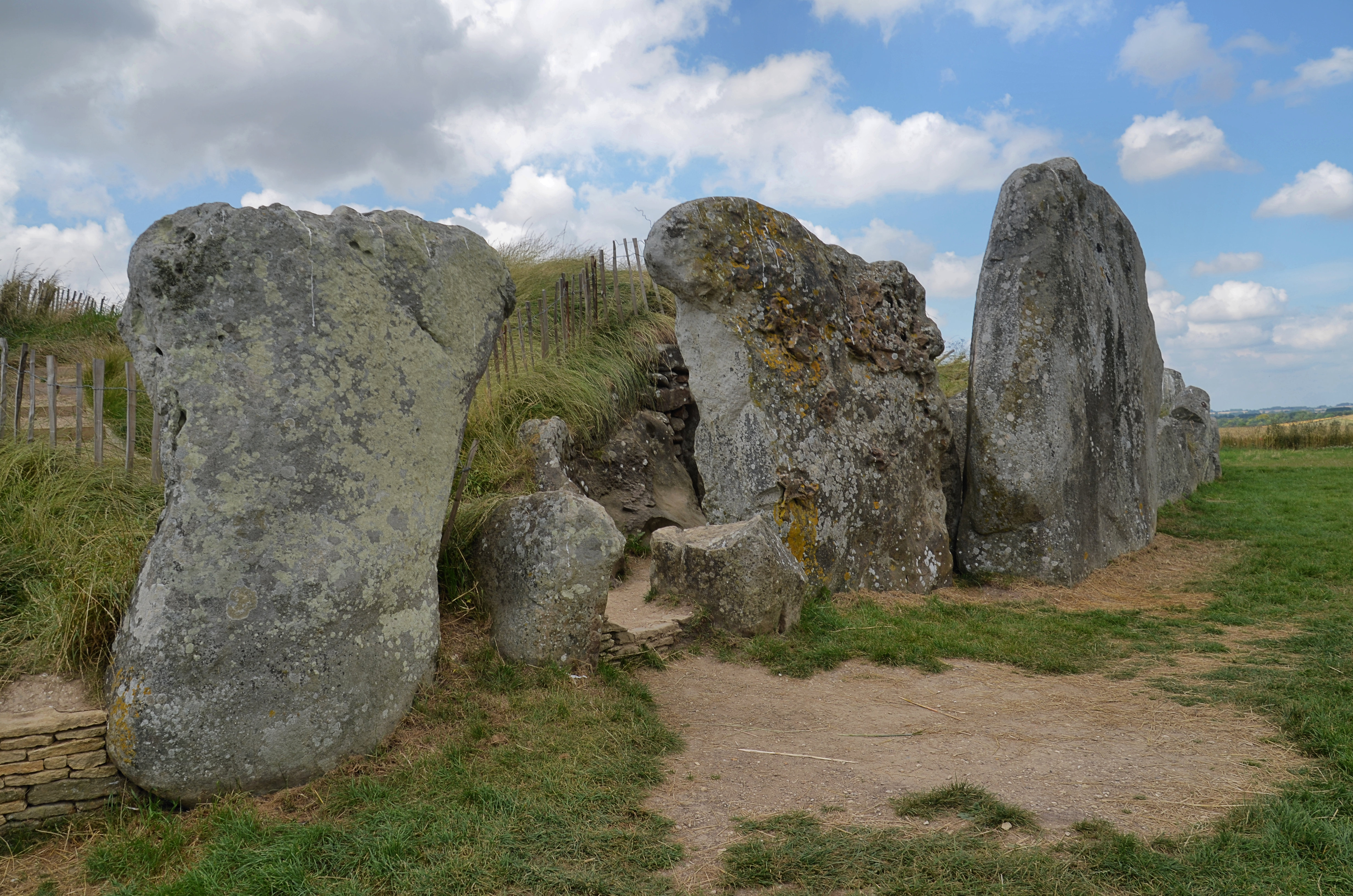
The front area of West Kennet Long Barrow in Wiltshire

In Britain, these tombs were typically located on prominent hills and slopes overlooking the surrounding landscape, perhaps at the junction between different territories. The archaeologist Caroline Malone noted that the tombs would have served as one of a variety of markers in the landscape that conveyed information on "territory, political allegiance, ownership, and ancestors." Many archaeologists have subscribed to the idea that these tomb-shrines served as territorial markers between different tribal groups, although others have argued that such markers would be of little use to a nomadic herding society. Instead it has been suggested that they represent markers along herding pathways. Many archaeologists have suggested that the construction of such monuments reflects an attempt to stamp control and ownership over the land, thus representing a change in mindset brought about by the transition from the hunter-gatherer Mesolithic to the pastoralist Early Neolithic. Others have suggested that these monuments were built on sites already deemed sacred by Mesolithic hunter-gatherers.

== Distribution ==
Tombs of this type are concentrated in the Cotswolds but extend as far as Gower and Avebury with some isolated examples in North Wales. Tombs of all three types are generally evenly distributed and it has been theorised that the design evolved over time. Severn-Cotswold tombs share certain features with the transepted gallery graves of the Loire and may have been inspired by these, with the lateral chambers and other differences being local variations.

In the 1960s and 1970s Dr John X. W. P. Corcoran and others argued that the group in fact consisted of three contemporary types, and later excavations have supported this.

== Archaeological investigation ==
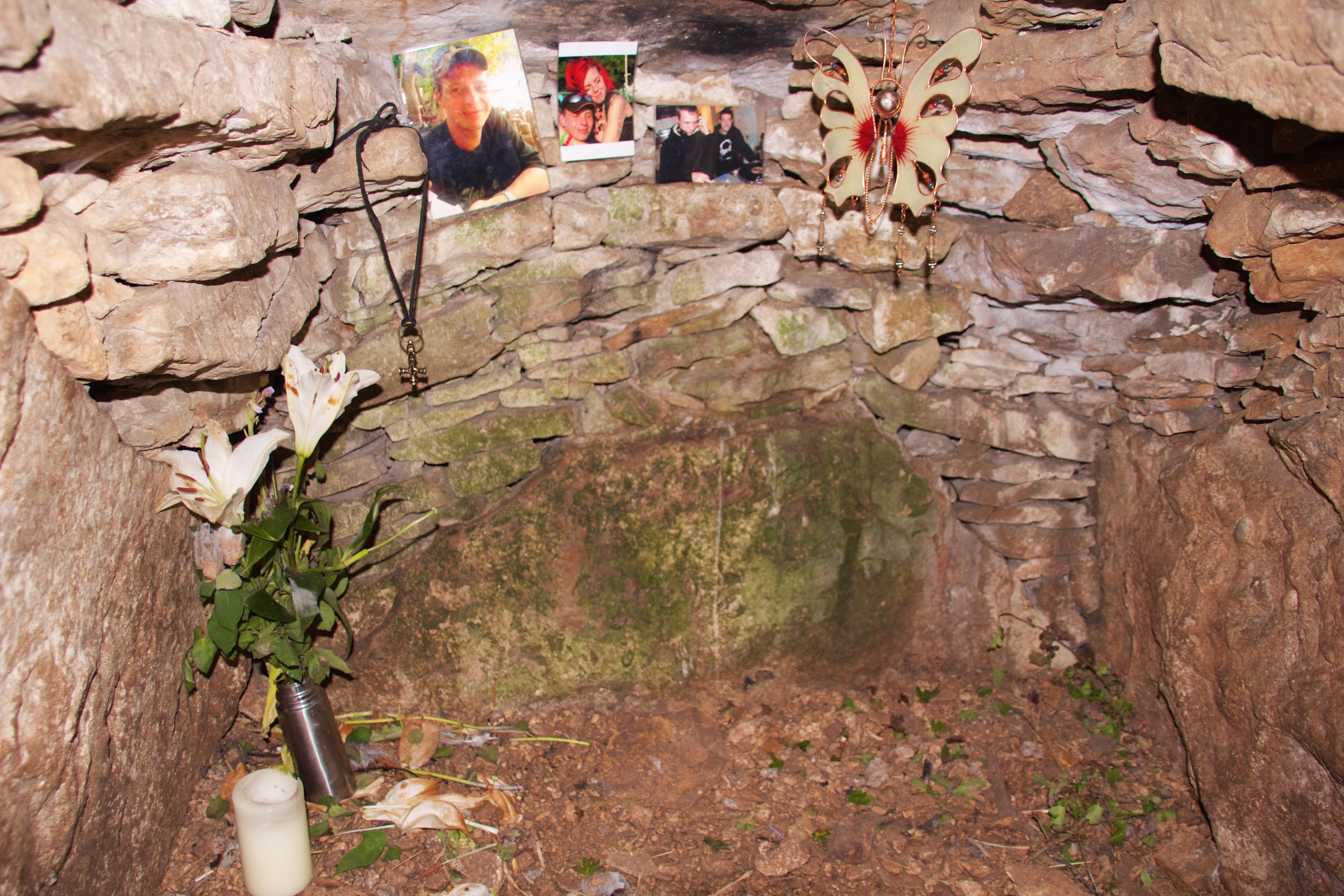
Memorial items, including a Thor's hammer pendant, in the chamber of Stoney Littleton Long Barrow in Somerset, 2015

One of the first major studies of the subject was The Long Barrows of the Cotswolds, written by the archaeologist O. G. S. Crawford and published in 1925.

During the nineteenth and twentieth centuries, a number of sites in the Cotswold–Severn Group were subject to restoration efforts to turn them into visitor attractions.

== List of sites ==
=== In the North Wessex Downs ===
Name	Location	Listed number	Still extant
Beckhampton Firs Long Barrow			
East Kennett Long Barrow	East Kennett, Wiltshire	1012323	
Horton Down Long Barrow	Wiltshire	1013141	
Kitchen Barrow	Wiltshire	1012519	
Longstones Long Barrow	Wiltshire	1008126	
Shepherd's Shore	Wiltshire	1014030	
South Street Long Barrow	Wiltshire		
Wayland's Smithy	Oxfordshire	1008409	
West Kennet Long Barrow	Wiltshire	1010628	
West Woods Long Barrow	Wiltshire		

=== In the Cotswold Hills ===
Name	Location	Listed number	Still extant
Avening Long Barrow	Avening, Gloucestershire		No
Belas Knap	Sudeley, Gloucestershire	1008199	Yes
Bown Hill Long Barrow	Gloucestershire	1017085	
Boxwell Lodge	Gloucestershire		
Buckholt Wood Long Barrow	Near Nympsfield, Gloucestershire		
Coberley Long Barrow	Gloucestershire	1002129	
Fox Covert Long Barrow	Wiltshire	1010396	
Gatcombe Lodge Long Barrow	Gloucestershire	1008623	
Giant's Cave	Near Badminton, Wiltshire	1010394	
Hawkesbury Knoll Long Barrow	Hawkesbury, Gloucestershire		
Hazleton long barrows	Hazleton, Gloucestershire	1003316	
Lanhill Long Barrow	Wiltshire	1010908	
Lechmore Tump	Gloucestershire	1002114	
Leighterton Long Barrow	Leighterton, Gloucestershire	1013590	
Lineover Long Barrow	Gloucestershire	1018166	
Lugbury Long Barrow	Wiltshire	1010397	
Uley Long Barrow	Uley, Gloucestershire	1008195	Yes
Norn's Tump	Gloucestershire	1008196	
Notgrove Long Barrow	Notgrove, Gloucestershire	1009157	
Nympsfield Long Barrow	Frocester, Gloucestershire	1007912	
Starveall Long Barrow	Gloucestershire	1002473	
Stoney Littleton Long Barrow	Somerset	1007910	
Symonds Hall Long Barrow	Near Wotton-Under-Edge, Gloucestershire	1002113	
The Tingle Stone	Gloucestershire	1008622	
The Toots	Near Selsley, Gloucestershire	1002131	
Tormarton Long Barrow	Near Tormarton, Gloucestershire		
Randwick Long Barrow	Gloucestershire	1002107	
Whispering Knights	Oxfordshire	1018400	
Whitfield's Tump	Near Minchinhampton, Gloucestershire	1008092	
Windmill Tump Long Barrow	Rodmarton, Gloucestershire	1008198	
Woodleaze Farm Long Barrow	Near Kingscote, Gloucestershire		

=== West of the Severn ===
Name	Location	Listed number	Still extant
Arthur's Stone	Bredwardine, Herefordshire	1010720	
Cross Lodge Long Barrow	Herefordshire	1014106	
Gwernvale Long Barrow	Crickhowell, Powys		
Parc le Breos Cwm	Pem-maen, Swansea		
Maesyfelin Long Barrow	St Lythans, Vale of Glamorgan		
Tinkinswood	St Nicholas, Vale of Glamorgan		

== Sources ==
- Burl, Aubrey (1981). Rites of the Gods. London: Weidenfeld & Nicolson. ISBN 978-0460043137.
- Darvill, Timothy (2004). Long Barrows of the Cotswolds and Surrounding Areas. Stroud: The History Press. ISBN 978-0752429076.
- Fowler, Chris; Olalde, Iñigo; et al. (27 January 2022). "A high-resolution picture of kinship practices in an Early Neolithic tomb". Nature. 601 (7894): 584–587. doi:10.1038/s41586-021-04241-4. ISSN 0028-0836. PMC 8896835. PMID 34937939.
- Hutton, Ronald (2013). Pagan Britain. New Haven and London: Yale University Press. ISBN 978-0300197716.
- Lynch, Frances (1997). Megalithic Tombs and Long Barrows in Britain. Princes Risborough: Shire Publications. ISBN 978-0747803416.
- Malone, Caroline (2001). Neolithic Britain and Ireland. Stroud: Tempus. ISBN 978-0752414423.
