= List of long barrows in the United Kingdom =

This is a list of long barrows in the United Kingdom.

== England ==
- Belas Knap, Gloucestershire
- Cat's Brain Long Barrow, Wiltshire
- Coldrum Long Barrow, Kent
- Fussell's Lodge, Wiltshire
- Foulmere Fen, Cambridgeshire
- Couckoo Ball Long Barrow, Devon
- Butterdon Hill Long Barrow, Dartmoor, Devon
- Corringdoon Ball Long Barrow, Devon
- Giants' Hills, Lincolnshire
- Hazleton long barrows, north and south, Gloucestershire
- Julliberrie's Grave, Kent
- Long Barrow, near the Seven Barrows, Berkshire
- Nympsfield Long Barrow, Gloucestershire
- Stoney Littleton Long Barrow, Somerset
- Street House, North Yorkshire
- Uley Long Barrow (aka Hetty Pegler's Tump), Gloucestershire
- Wayland's Smithy, Oxfordshire
- West Kennet Long Barrow, Wiltshire
- White Barrow, Wiltshire
- Windmill tump, Gloucestershire
- Long barrow, Therfield Heath, near Royston, Hertfordshire

== Scotland ==
- Broadfold Cottage long barrow
- Capo Plantation long barrow
- Catto Long Barrow, Aberdeenshire
- Gerrieswells long barrow
- Herald Hill long barrow
- Longman Cairn long barrow
- Pitlurg long barrow

== Wales ==
- Ffostyll Long Barrows
- Ty-Isaf Long Barrow
- Cwm Fforest Long Barrow
- Ty Illtyd Long Barrow
- Pen-y-Wyrlod Long Barrow
- Mynydd Troed Long Barrow
- Pipton Long Barrow
- Pen-y-Garn-Goch Long Barrow
- Little Lodge Long Barrow
- Waun Pwtlyn Long Barrow
- Tythegston Long Barrow
- New House Long Barrow
- Heston Brake Long Barrow
- Thornwell Farm Long Barrow
