= East Kennett Long Barrow =

British neolithic archaeological site

- Location within Wiltshire
- 51°24′02″N 1°50′03″W
- Type: Long Barrow
- Periods: Neolithic
- Location: Wiltshire, England, United Kingdom
- Region: Wiltshire England

History
- Built: c. 4100 BC - c. 3300 BC

Scheduled monument
- Official name: East Kennett long barrow, 600m south of East Kennett church
- Designated: 26 Jun 1924
- Reference no.: 1012323

The East Kennett Long Barrow is an Early Neolithic long barrow located near East Kennett and Marlborough in Wiltshire, England, overlooking the Kennet River Valley. The barrow is part of the larger Cotswold-Severn Group, a concentration of long barrows grouped in Western England.

== Appearance ==
The East Kennett Long Barrow sits in an agricultural field, not accessible to the general public. The barrow, now covered in trees, follows a north-west and east-south orientation. The feature is flat topped and is rectangular in shape at 106m long and 50m wide, making it one of the longest barrows in Wiltshire. While fairly infilled, flanking ditches are still visible along the sides of the monument.

Surveys of the surrounding field show evidence of eroded lynchets from agricultural activity and other potential barrows and earthworks. The site has marks of 19th century antiquarian excavations, but is relatively intact apart from this.

== History ==
While the site has not been formally excavated by archaeologists, antiquarians dug several pits over the course of the Victorian era. These digs have uncovered sarsen stones of considerable size. While the artifacts uncovered have been lost, a Romano-British burial was excavated in the side of the long barrow.

In 1840, a Bronze Age bowl barrow was excavated 120 meters west of the long barrow, which uncovered human remains from a beaker group burial and contained a bronze dagger and other artifacts. Some of these now reside in the British Museum. The concentration of bowl barrows and other mortuary features constitute a "loosely clustered cemetery."

The site was first recorded in 1743 by William Stukeley and continued to be included in descriptions, surveys, and maps of the area over the following centuries.
