= Nympsfield =

Coordinates: 51°42′N 2°17′W

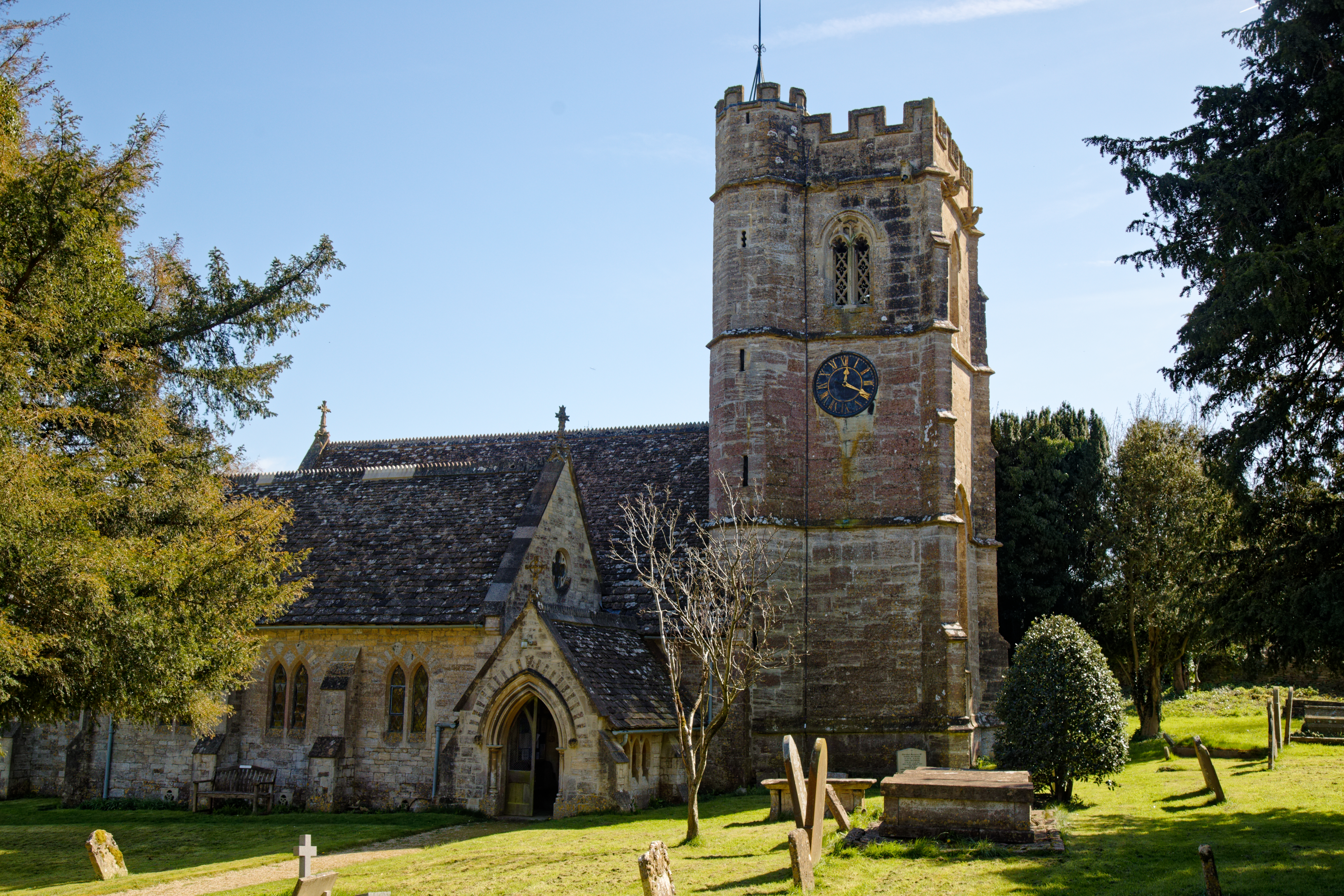
- St. Bartholomew's Church

- Location within Gloucestershire
- Population: 382 (2011 Census)
- Civil parish: Nympsfield
- District: Stroud
- Shire county: Gloucestershire
- Region: South West
- Country: England
- Sovereign state: United Kingdom
- Post town: Stonehouse
- Postcode district: GL10
- Police: Gloucestershire
- Fire: Gloucestershire
- Ambulance: South Western
- UK Parliament: Stroud

Nympsfield is a village and civil parish in the English county of Gloucestershire. It is located around 4 mi (6.4 km) south-west of the town of Stroud. As well as Nympsfield village, the parish contains the hamlet of Cockadilly. The population taken at the 2011 census was 382.

== Sights ==
Nympsfield is on the path of a former Roman road, which ran from Cirencester to Arlingham. The village has a pub, the Rose and Crown, a working men's club, both Catholic (St Joseph's) and Church of England (St Bartholomew's) churches and a Catholic primary school (St Joseph's).

Nearby Woodchester Mansion, an unfinished gothic mansion, has always been associated with the village, as Nympsfield's history of Catholicism tied it to the Leigh family, who built the mansion. Parking is just outside the village and a free minibus to the mansion is operated by volunteers on days when it is open to the public. A Neolithic burial site known as the Nympsfield Long Barrow is located adjacent to the nearby Coaley Peak picnic site, around half a mile from the village. The Tudor Owlpen Manor, Hetty Pegler's Tump (a neolithic long barrow) and Uley Bury (an Iron Age hill fort) are also nearby.

Nympsfield is the home of the Bristol and Gloucestershire Gliding Club.

Peter Hennessy, the constitutional historian, took the title Baron Hennessy of Nympsfield on receiving his peerage in 2010.

Alfred Bird, inventor of egg-free custard and also baking powder, was born in Nympsfield in 1811.

== Etymology ==
The name 'Nympsfield' is a mix of Celtic and Old English, meaning 'Open land by the holy place'. The Celtic element of the name is nimet (holy place), and the Old English element is feld (field, open space). The earliest known recording of the village was as Nymdesfelda in 862 AD. In the Domesday Book, the settlement was recorded as Nimdesfelde.

== In fiction ==
Nympsfield and the Rose and Crown Inn appear in several scenes in the 2012 novel Caballito by Robin Baker. The author uses the fictional names Pegbury (for Nympsfield) and The Crown (for the inn) but from the description of location and interior it is clearly the Rose and Crown as it was in the early 1980s.

== See also ==
- List of civil parishes in Gloucestershire
- Owlpen
