= Hazleton long barrows =

Neolithic chambered tomb in England

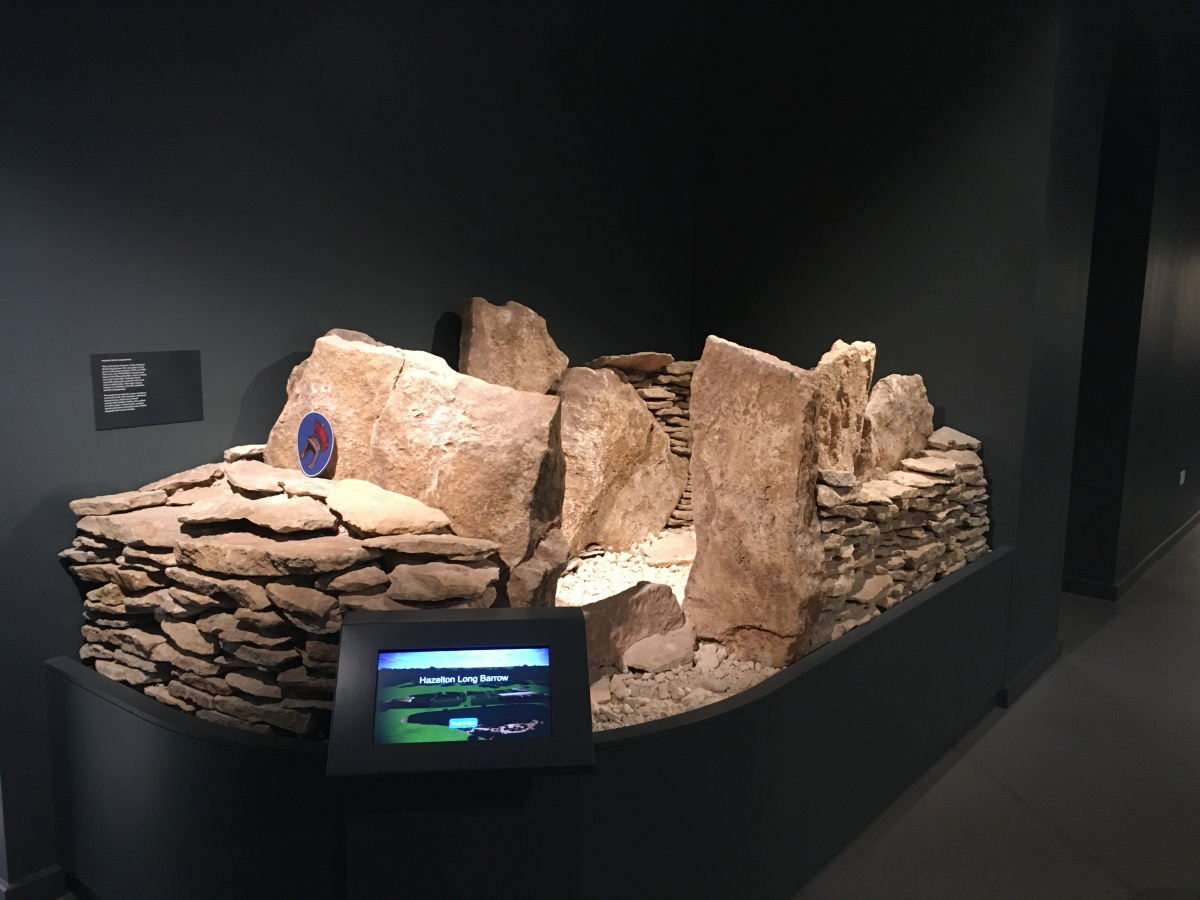
- Interactive map of Hazleton long barrows
- 51°52′07″N 01°53′45″W
- Type: Long barrow
- Location: Gloucestershire, England

Site notes
- Material: Limestone
- Excavation dates: From 1979 to 1982
- Archaeologists: Team led by Alan Saville
- Management: English Heritage

Hazleton long barrows are a pair of Neolithic chambered tombs located close to Hazleton village in Gloucestershire, England. Part of the Cotswold-Severn group of long barrows, the barrows, Hazleton North and Hazleton South, date back to approximately 3700-3600 BCE. Hazleton North is deemed a notable archaeological site owing to its well-preserved structure that allowed researchers to gain insight into early farming communities during prehistoric British society.

Hazleton North underwent a major and total archaeological excavation between 1979 and 1982. Results of the excavation offered direct evidence of kinship-based burial practices, revealing one of the earliest-known family trees from DNA analysis. Comprehensive research into the barrow's construction, deconstruction and inner burial chamber provided valuable information on Neolithic burial culture and social organisation in prehistoric Britain.

== Location of the Hazleton long barrows ==
The two Hazleton long barrows are situated on the Cotswold Hills in Gloucestershire (51°52'07" N, 01°53'45" W), close to the main A40 road, south of Birmingham and west of Oxford. The Hazleton barrows are located to the northwest of Hazleton village, approximately 16 kilometres east of Cheltenham.

== Description ==
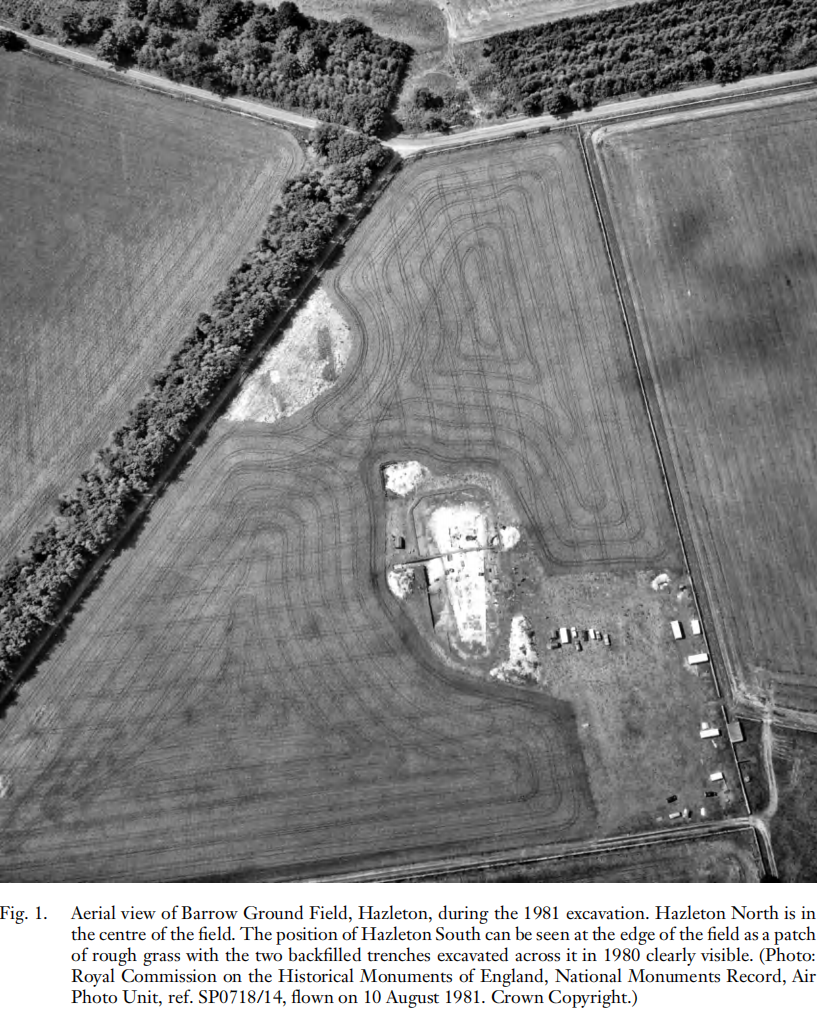
Aerial photograph of barrow

Hazleton long barrows consist of two separate cairns: Hazleton North Cairn and Hazleton South Cairn. Both cairns are located north of Hazleton village, approximately 250 metres above Ordnance Datum. The bedrock is fine-grained limestone of the Great Oolite Group, dating from the Middle Jurassic. Substantial springs were located a kilometre away from the east of Hazleton North Cairn, flowing south-eastwards to the Sherbourne Brook and eventually the River Thames.

The North Cairn was the better-preserved of the two, as the Royal Commission on the Historical Monuments of England aerial photograph shows. It was a trapezoidal earthwork 63 metres in length and with a maximum width of 22 metres, and is aligned west-south-west – east-north-east. It was excavated between 1979 and 1982 by an archaeology team led by Alan Saville. After the removal of the ploughsoil, the shape of North Cairn appeared as an 'elongated, tapering rectangle some 53 m long x 19–8 m wide'. Analysis of samples from the buried land surface on which Hazleton North was constructed showed that it was built in an abandoned arable area where large trees such as beech and oak were scarce. To acquire stone for constructing the cairn, two quarries were used adjacent to the tomb, one to the west and the other to the east.

Unlike Hazleton North Cairn that had been fully excavated by the end of the 1982 season, South Cairn remains an intact earthwork that has not been archaeologically investigated apart from two exploratory trenches made across it in 1980. This oval-shaped barrow is 50 metres long (northwest to southeast), a maximum width of 24.4 metres (southwest to northeast) and is 0.9 metres in height.

== Archaeological context ==
The Neolithic period marked an era of transformation and had significant impact on human cultures, beliefs and interpersonal relationships. The word "Neolithic" describes the later or polished Stone Age; a period characterized by beautiful weapons and instruments made of flint and other kinds of stone'. During this period, the migration of Anatolian farmers occurred in continental Europe and the population began to spread out all over the continent. Such migration brought many innovative subsistence practices, and it led to new forms of social connection, economy, material culture and inevitably, epidemic possibilities that endangered health. From a sociological and anthropological perspective, the large migration of new population into the British Isles led to fundamental changes in the way the inhabitants interacted with the landscape, especially when it came to constructing monuments. The treatment of dead bodies went through fundamental changes.

The inhabitants experienced the fundamental transition from a highly mobile hunter-gathering way of life to a more stable, settled living pattern due to the introduction of crops and domesticated animals. Through the archaeological excavation of Hazleton North long barrow, researchers could better identify which attributes of individuals contribute to the inclusion within the ancient tomb and thereby identify leadership during the Neolithic period.

== Archaeological excavation of Hazleton North ==
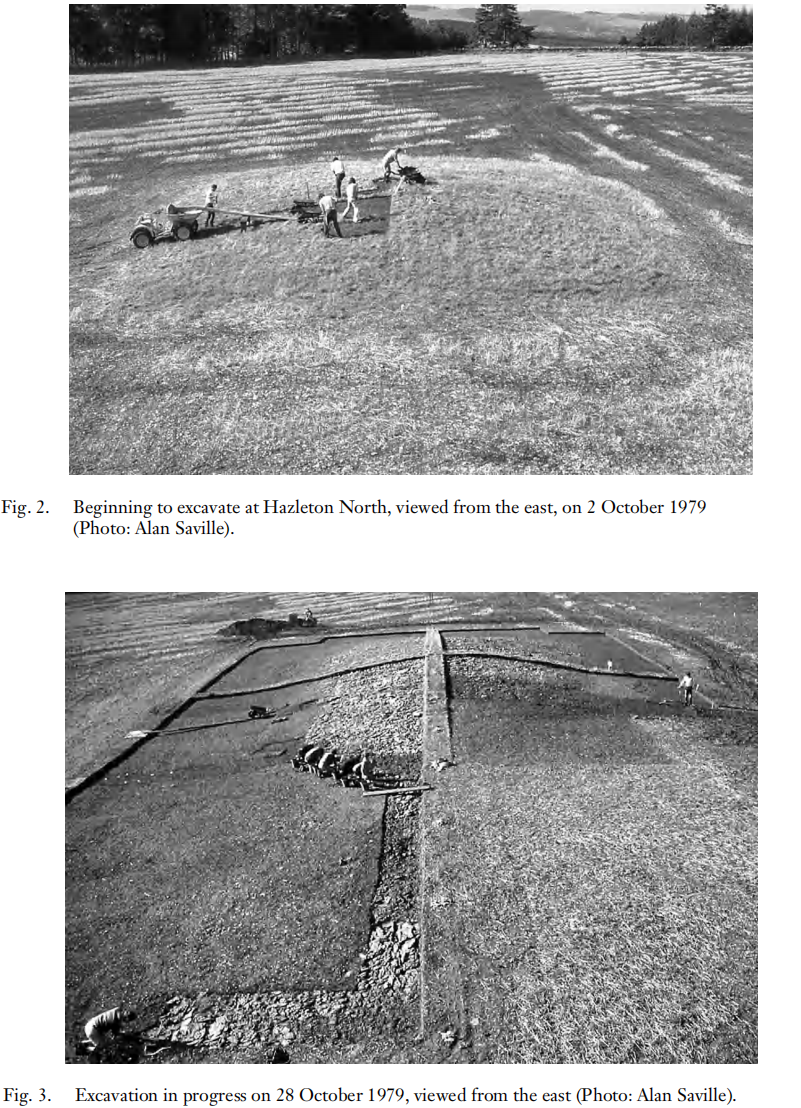
The excavation

The excavation project was organised by Alan Saville and his team with the support of Cheltenham Art Gallery and Museum, running from 1979 to 1982. Hazleton North was excavated in a technique coined by Professor W.F. Grimes, in which the cairn was dismantled in the opposite order of its construction (i.e., reverse stratigraphic order). This sequence of deconstruction allowed researchers to understand the construction methods of such monuments by the Neolithic inhabitants, especially regarding the logical sequence in which 'retaining walls or revetments were used to consolidate the mass of the structure, exploiting to the full the inherent properties of the local Cotswold limestone as a building material'. Building stone was collected from adjacent quarries located at the north and the south of the monument. Red deer antlers used as picks to extract the limestone were found in the quarries.

=== Archaeological excavation results and interpretations ===
Hazleton North contained two burial chambers, the south chamber and the north chamber, which were both in a semi-collapsed condition. However, due to limestone-based alkaline environment, beneath the collapse the burial chambers were well preserved and allowed for more accurate observation of the mode of burial and specific numbers. In the south chamber archaeologists found remains of 14 adults, 6-11 pre-adults and one foetus. These remains were placed in two places: in the passage and the chamber, and in the entrance. Archaeologists noted the absence of long bones and that skulls were placed on the edges of the burial chambers.

In the north chamber, archaeologists found skeletal remains of 4 adults, 4-6 pre-adults and a foetus, as well as one complete, extended adult male inhumed in the same place, the remains of two adults and two pre-adults, and the cremated bones of at least one adult and one pre-adult.

Both burial chambers were protected by devices such as blocking slabs that guarded against invasive access by humans and animals. In the north chamber, a collapse of the cairn stonework occurred yet the blocking slab in the passage was preserved, which still prevented access to the north chamber.

Overall, the estimated number of burials found in Hazleton long barrows based on archaeological analysis, seems to be 27-30 individuals, evenly distributed in age and sex. These archaeological observations from the excavation of Hazleton North positively support the hypothesis that the Hazleton burials commenced in successive order. Bodies decomposed within the tomb, and skeletal parts were disarticulated and redistributed during the process of further burial practices. It has been established that at least 27 individuals were biologically related successive generations of one single family, and the majority were biologically from the same man who had children with four different women. Analysis has established that genetically unrelated males were adopted into the lineage and buried in the same cairn, suggesting that Neolithic kinship structure also contains blended families.

== Architectural construction of Hazleton North ==
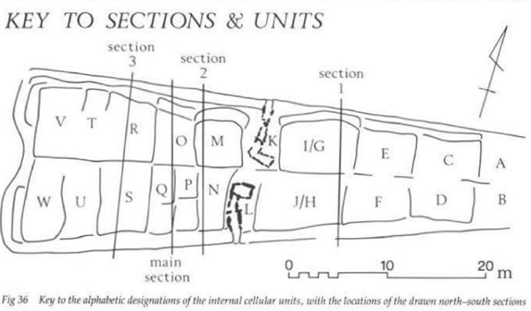
The cellular plan of the cairn

As the excavation of Hazleton North progressed, the inner structure of the cairn was exposed and several cairn subdivisions were observed, defined by the regular alignments of units within the general stonework-based sections. These alignments of units appeared to develop a specific pattern of rectangle aligned from the north to the south, and the southern part of the cairn was separated by an axial east–west aligned ridge of stones that were pitched against each other. As these units comprised a massive amount of stones and other deposits that were bound by vertical drystone revetment, the excavation method adhered to these revetments, clearing part or all of the internal mass of its fill so that the revetment could be isolated. As shown in the left side figure, the cellular plan of the cairn is displayed and each excavated unit was given alphabetic designations.

The architectural system of these cellular units was not the preliminary method of cairn construction, as it started with dumps of material on the original land surface. These dumps were discovered to be made of soil and marl, and they contained three Neolithic sherds, 14 animal bone fragments including pig, sheep and cattle, and 13 pieces of flint, which suggested a subsistence economy trend involving animal husbandry and butchery practices. The research on flints and flint-based tools was mainly carried out by Alan Saville, a lithic specialist. He identified evidence of Mesolithic flint-knapping activities from a hunter's encampment in the buried land surface of the forecourt area of the Neolithic tomb. The Neolithic artefacts within the dumps and the Mesolithic pre-cairn artefact assemblage excavated from the buried soil indicated cultural activities taking place in the area before the formal monument use.

== Radiocarbon examination of Hazleton North burial site ==
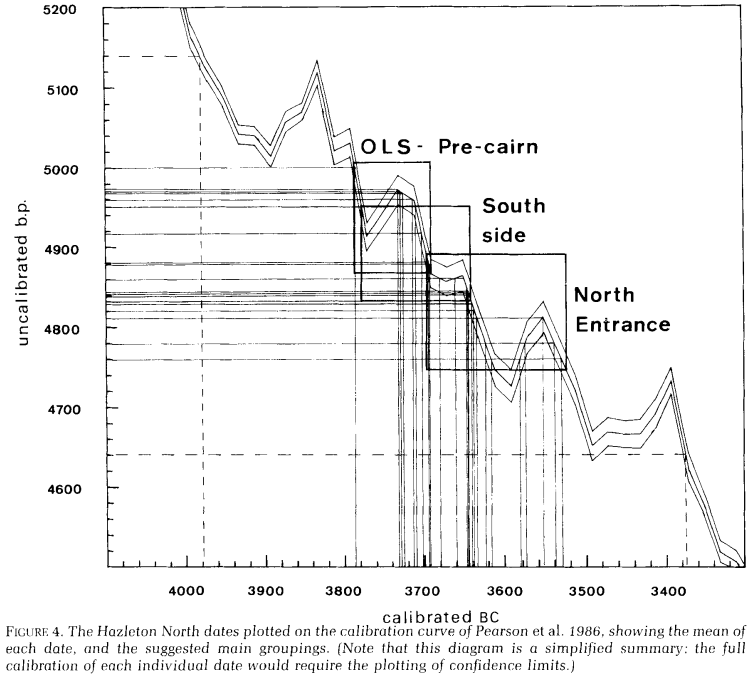
The radiocarbon examination

The excavation of Hazleton North has produced a substantial quantity of stratified materials for further radiocarbon examination done by AMS: Accelerator Mass Spectrometry. Samples collected from the cairn were sent to the archaeology research laboratory at the University of Oxford. Hazleton North, one of the chambered tombs from the Gloucestershire heartland of the Cotswold-Severn group, has undergone total excavation and comprehensive radiocarbon-dated examinations. Findings indicated that the Hazleton North tomb was chronologically located in the middle of the fourth millennium BC. Since the burial site was constructed periodically in accordance with chronologically developing cultural activities, the duration of its construction time can be, despite being debatable, compressed into a timescale around c. 3800-3500 BC, for all episodes of cultural activities including pre-cairn activities, construction of cairn, burial deposition practices as well as latter abandonment. Apart from debate, the direct outcome of this dating project was the demonstration that contrary to other Cotswold-Severn tombs, the Hazleton North tomb was used in a short period of time, approximately less than 300 calendar years, as Saville reported. Another findings that supported the short-lived Hazleton barrow hypothesis was that by comparing to other barrows located in the Cotswold-Severn tombs group, the Hazleton barrows was the rare example that contained paired cairns, indicating that it is precisely in this circumstance that a short use timespan was expected.

=== Implications of the radiocarbon examination outcome ===
An updated research project done by Bayliss and Whittle redated materials and bones from Hazleton North barrow using advanced isotopic analysis techniques and reconfirmed that there was a rather narrow timescale of tomb construction and relevant burial practices at the beginning of the fourth millennium cal BC, around 3700 cal BC, suggesting that Hazleton North was used for a short time and abandoned afterwards. However, comparing to other radiocarbon examinations of Cotswold-Severn tombs including Penywrylod mass grave, West Kennet long barrow, Wayland's Smithy barrow, and Ascott-under-Wychwood, the outcome indicated that overall Cotswold-Severn tombs were generally used for a long period of time in terms of burial activities and cairn construction, in contrast to the existing results from the investigations of Hazleton North barrow. Such discrepancy of the duration of barrow use challenged the traditional chronological view of Neolithic barrows, implying certain burial privileges conferred upon members of the community in the Hazleton North barrow.

== Post-excavation ==
All finds and site records during the Hazleton barrow excavation were deposited at the Corinium Museum in Cirencester, where they remain available for future archaeological research. Alan Saville and his team also collaborated with the Corinium Museum to establish a public display featuring a reconstructed painting of the Hazleton North inner chambers by John Sibbick, based on on-site photographs and footage.

== See also ==
- Cotswold-Severn Group of long barrows
- List of long barrows in the United Kingdom
