= Alan Saville =

British archaeologist and museum curator (1946–2016)

Alan Saville (31 December 1946 – 19 June 2016) was a British archaeologist and museum curator.

Saville is best known for his "ground-breaking"' and "meticulous" excavations of the Neolithic Hazleton North long barrow near Hazleton in Gloucestershire, undertaken between 1979 and 1982.

== Life and career ==
Saville was born in Lewisham, London, and studied Ancient History and Archaeology at the University of Birmingham, graduating in 1968. He worked in the West Midlands, then on the lithic assemblage from Roger Mercer's excavations at Grimes Graves, working for the Inspectorate of Ancient Monuments at the Department of the Environment (DoE). In 1972 the DoE sent him to Gloucestershire to excavate the Neolithic long barrow at Coaley Peak, Frocester. This began a long connection with the Cotswolds, an area he fell in love with, and where he undertook many excavations.

Saville served on numerous committees locally, regionally, and nationally. He was a founding member of the Neolithic Studies Group and the Lithic Studies Group (now the Lithic Studies Society). In 1981 he was elected a Fellow of the Society of Antiquaries of London.

In 1989 Saville joined the staff of the National Museums of Scotland in Edinburgh as a Curator and later Senior Curator in the Archaeology Department. He went on to become President of the Society of Antiquaries of Scotland, from 2011 to 2014.

Saville was the editor of the European Journal of Archaeology from 2004 to 2010.

== Hazleton North excavations ==
One of two long barrows in a field, Hazleton North was excavated between 1979 and 1982 as a response to plough damage being suffered by the site. The excavation was total, with the barrow completely removed. A total of 35 individuals were excavated from the two burial chambers in the barrow. After many years of post-excavation work, Saville published the site in 1990.

In 2010, the UK's Ministry of Justice decided that all excavated human remains should be reburied. Luckily for archaeological science this policy was soon dropped. Successful scientific studies were conducted on the Hazleton remains long after the dig, and Saville noted that this would not have been possible if the bones had been reburied rather than being kept in a museum, dismissing “quasi-religious funerary sanctions to prehistoric human bone” as “simply nonsensical”. This was a prescient attitude, as in 2021, six years after Saville's death, archaeologists from the universities of Newcastle, Central Lancashire, Exeter and York, and geneticists from the universities of Harvard, Vienna and the Basque country published the results of the examination of the bones and teeth of 35 people buried in Hazleton North. The research team discovered that 27 were biological relatives from five continuous generations of a single extended family.

== Personal life ==
Saville was married twice. His first wife was Kathleen Saville. He married his second wife, Annette Carruthers, in 1986.

== Partial list of works by Saville ==
- Alan Saville, (1981). ‘Flint and chert’, in R.J. Mercer, ‘Excavations at Carn Brea, Illogan, Cornwall, 1970–73: a Neolithic fortified complex of the third millennium BC’, Cornish Archaeology 20, 101–152.
- Alan Saville, (1981). Grimes Graves, Norfolk. Excavations 1971–72: Volume 2. The flint assemblage. Department of Environment Archaeological Report 11, London.
- Alan Saville, ed., (1984). Archaeology in Gloucestershire. Cheltenham Art Gallery and Museum, and Bristol and Gloucestershire Archaeological Society, Cheltenham.
- Alan Saville, John A.J. Gowlett & Robert E.M. Hedges, (1987), "Radiocarbon dates from the chambered tomb at Hazleton (Glos.): a chronology for Neolithic collective burial". Antiquity 61:231, 108–119.
- Alan Saville, (1990), Hazleton North, Gloucestershire, 1979–82: The excavation of a Neolithic long cairn of the Cotswold-Severn Group. English Heritage Archaeological Report 13. London: English Heritage. ISBN 978-1850742135.
- Alan Saville, (2008). ‘The flint and chert’, in Roger Mercer and Frances Healy, Hambledon Hill, Dorset, England. Excavation and survey of a Neolithic monument complex and its surrounding landscape, Volume 1, 648–743. English Heritage, Swindon.
- Hedges, R.; Saville, A.; O'Connell, T. (2008), "Characterizing the diet of individuals at the Neolithic chambered tomb of Hazleton North, Gloucestershire, England, using stable isotopic analysis", Archaeometry, 50 (1): 114–128, doi:10.1111/j.1475-4754.2007.00379.x
- Alan Saville, (2010). ‘Anatomizing an archaeological project – Hazleton revisited’, Transactions of the Bristol and Gloucestershire Archaeological Society 128, 9–27.
