= Shepherd's Shore =

Long Barrow in Wiltshire, England

Shepards' Shore Long Barrow
- Location within Wiltshire
- 51°23′38″N 1°56′43″W
- Type: Long barrow
- Periods: Neolithic
- Location: England
- Region: Wiltshire England

History
- Built: c. 4100 BC – c. 3300 BC

Scheduled monument
- Official name: Long barrow 650m WSW of Shepherds' Shore
- Designated: 10 Nov 1964
- Reference no.: 1014030

Shepard's Shore Long Barrow is a Neolithic long barrow near Bishops Cannings in Wiltshire, England. The barrow is part of the larger Cotswold-Severn Group, a concentration of long barrows grouped in Western England.

== Description ==
While the Shepard's Shore Barrow's height has been degraded due to ploughing, the feature's oval shape rises .2 meters off the ground. It is 35 metres (115 ft) long and 16 metres (52 ft) wide and has a ENE-WSW orientation. The barrow was constructed with chalk rubble covering a grave that contained both inhumations and cremains above a floor made of oolite and sarsen stones.

In 1914, the barrow was excavated after ploughing uncovered unexpected sarsen stones. There was evidence the site had been previously disturbed during the modern area, as a tobacco pipe was found at a lower layer. Below the disturbed layer, the excavation uncovered the incomplete skeletal remains of at least five individuals, both child and adult, and evidence of additional cremated remains. The bones were disarticulated and multiple vertebrae had been strung along a human rib bone.

Shepard's Shore Barrow is in proximity to a number of other historically significant landmarks. There are three bronze age bowl barrows 200 meters north of the site; the southernmost one was excavated in the 19th century and female remains were found. The long barrow is also 500 meters from the Wansdyke earthworks.
