= Lockeridge =

Village in Wiltshire, England

Coordinates: 51.409°N 1.789°W

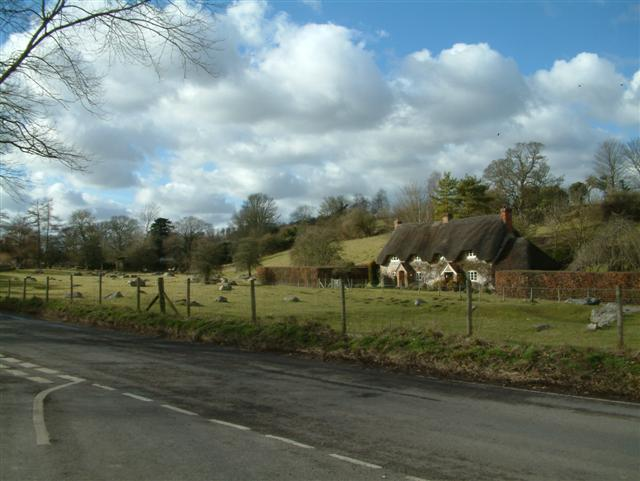
- Lockeridge Dene, a conservation area in the village

- Location within Wiltshire
- Population: 291 (in 1991)
- OS grid reference: SU148678
  - London: 74 miles (119 km) E
- Civil parish: West Overton
- Unitary authority: Wiltshire
- Ceremonial county: Wiltshire
- Region: South West
- Country: England
- Sovereign state: United Kingdom
- Post town: Marlborough
- Postcode district: SN8
- Dialling code: 01672
- Police: Wiltshire
- Fire: Dorset and Wiltshire
- Ambulance: South Western
- UK Parliament: East Wiltshire
- Website: Parish Council

Lockeridge is a village in Wiltshire, England. It lies at the edge of the West Woods in the Kennet Valley, 2.9 miles (4.7 km) west of Marlborough, 3.1 miles (5.0 km) east of Avebury and 10.5 miles (16.9 km) south of Swindon. It is 0.6 miles (0.97 km) south of the A4 road which was historically the main route from London to the west of England. Lockeridge Dene is a hamlet immediately southwest of the village.

Lockeridge and its surroundings have provided evidence of Stone and Bronze Age activity in the area. Field enclosures close to the village indicate Roman occupation, whilst the village itself appears in the Domesday Book of 1086. Lockeridge today forms an agricultural and commuter community with no local industry. The community is served by a village pub, the Who'd a Thought It.

== History ==
The area has extensive evidence of Neolithic settlement and a Bronze Age burial site was discovered behind the school in the 19th century. Field enclosures on White Hill (a ridge above the village) provide evidence of Roman occupation probably linked to the nearby fortress town of Cunetio. One possible derivation of the name is from the Old English composite word loc(a)-hrycg meaning "a ridge marked by enclosure(s)".

At the time of the Domesday Book of 1086, Lockeridge was owned by Durand of Gloucester and is described as follows: Durand himself holds LOCKERIDGE. Almær held it TRE, and it paid geld for 2 hides. There is land for 1 plough. Of this 1 hide is in demesne. There is 1 villan and 2 bordars with 1 slave, and 1-acre (4,000 m^{2}) of meadow, and 12 acres (4.9 ha) of pasture and 6 acres (2.4 ha) of woodland. It was worth 40s; now 30s. These two late Anglo-Saxon estates are held to be linked to the cluster of houses at Lockeridge Dene at the southern end of the village, and the eighteenth-century Lockeridge House at the northern end. Lockeridge House is adjacent to Piper's Lane, remnant of a Roman road.

Building took place between the two Saxon settlements in the 12th century on the order of the Knights Templar who acquired one of the estates between 1141 and 1143. In 1155–1156 it acquired land in Rockley to build a Preceptory. Lockeridge is therefore something rare in Britain, namely a planned Templar village. The collapse of the nearby settlement of Shaw as a result of the Plague may have triggered growth as Lockeridge was situated at an intersection of a major east–west route (now the A4) and a crossing of the Pewsey Downs. The Templar link explains the absence (rare in Wiltshire villages) of a church.

The settlement expanded from a hamlet to a village in the 1870s when Sir Henry Meux sited his estate office (Gypsy Furlong) and the estate yard (Yardacre) in the village. Houses, a school and a pub were built at the same time.

In consequence of this history there are three main architectural styles in the village.

- Sarsen stone, generally painted or left rough-hewn, and thatched with wheat or wheat-reed mix.
- Victorian estate architecture built of dressed stones or Wiltshire redbrick with sarsen banding. Many of these are the work of C.E. Ponting, architect to the Meux estate in the 1870s.
- 20th-century solid brick council housing and in-fill in a variety of styles, in the main street and on Back Lane and Rhyls Lane.

== Governance ==
Lockeridge forms part of the civil parish of West Overton, which elects a joint parish council with the adjacent parish of Fyfield, named Kennet Valley Parish Council. It falls within the area of the Wiltshire Council unitary authority, which is responsible for most local government functions.

== Landmarks ==
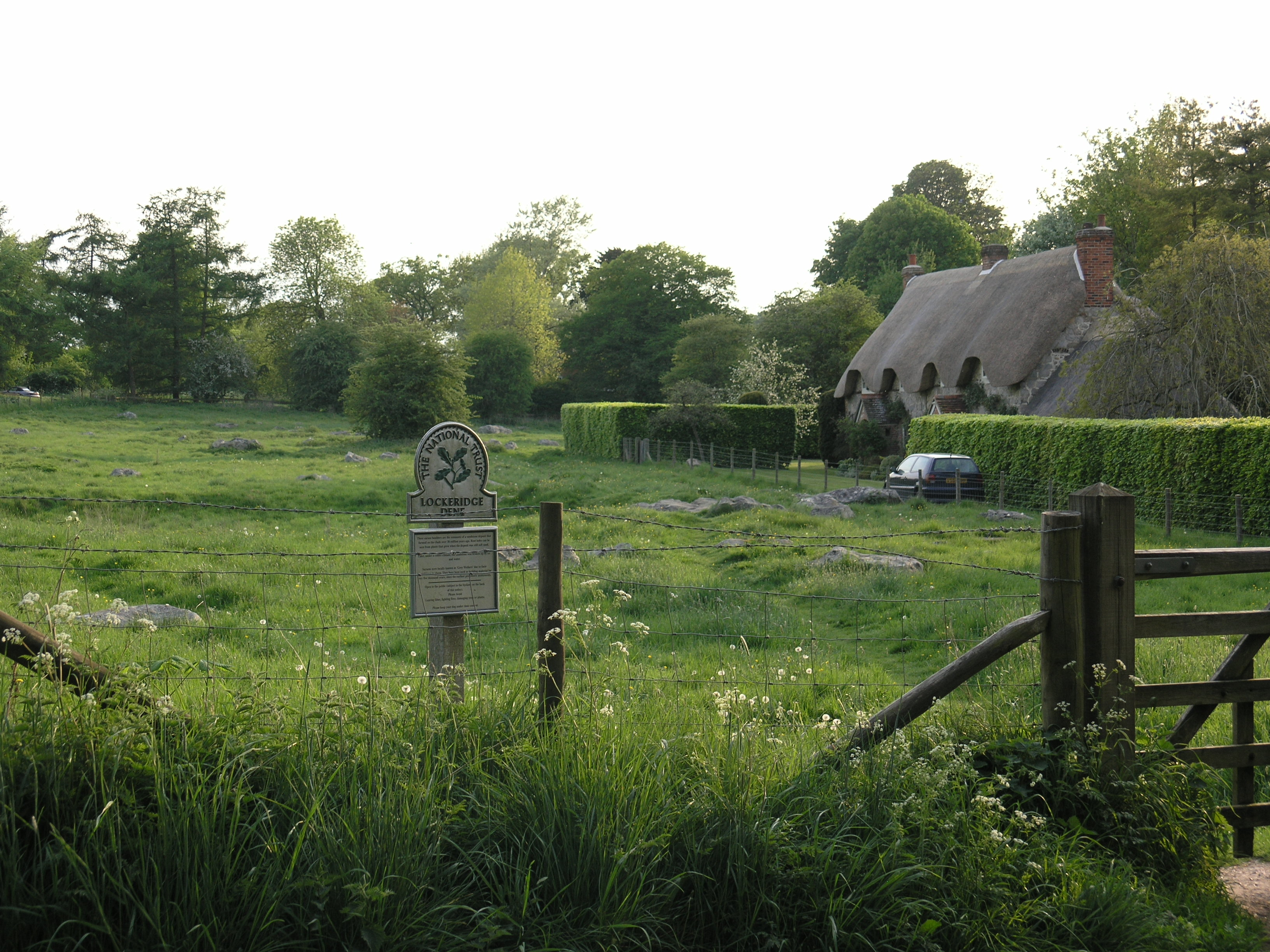
Lockeridge Dene

Lockeridge House, on the other side of the river from the village, was built around 1740 and is Grade II* listed. The two-storey house is in red brick, and its five-bay front has a pedimented doorway; there are later extensions at the right and rear. At the roadside entrance are brick walls of the same period, cast iron gates and piers topped with pineapples; Pevsner noted their large size.

Lockeridge Dene at the south end of the village is a National Trust site and is a conservation area. Sarsen stones are scattered over the area, and this is one of the sites from which the stones at Avebury were obtained.

The village is adjacent to the West Woods, which in spring are carpeted with bluebells.

Walks from the village lead through the West Woods onto the Pewsey Downs and the Wansdyke, an early medieval earthwork that ran from near Andover to the Bristol Channel and became the border between the Anglo-Saxon kingdoms of Mercia and Wessex.

== Amenities ==
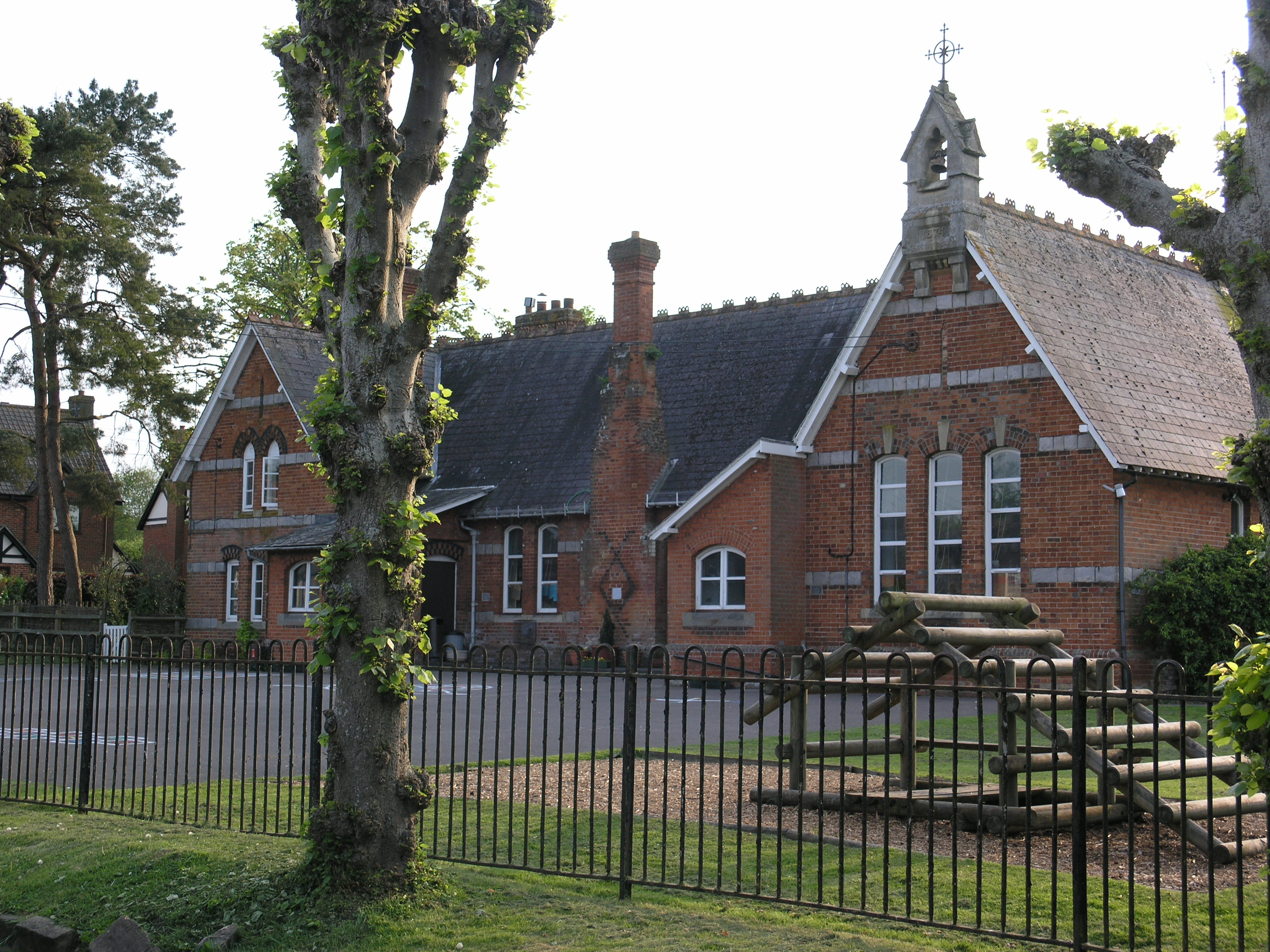
Kennet Valley Primary School

The Kennet Valley Church of England Primary School draws children from Lockeridge and nearby villages. The first building for Overton cum Fyfield National School, designed by C. E. Ponting, opened in 1875 and by 1906 was attended by 117 pupils. After numbers fell, in 1990 the school was federated with the village school at East Kennett; accommodation at Lockeridge was increased and in 2011 the East Kennett site was closed. For secondary education, most children go on to St John's, Marlborough.

Kennet Valley Cricket Club has its ground next to the village hall, drawing members from Lockeridge as well as West Overton, East Kennett and Fyfield.

== Notable people ==
The Lacket, an 18th-century thatched cottage on the southwest edge of the village, was bought in 1908 as a weekend retreat by the politician and writer Hilton Young (later Baron Kennet), and was rented in 1914–15 by the author Lytton Strachey. The cottage was also the home of Young's son Wayland.

From 1910, A. N. Whitehead and his wife Evelyn also had a cottage at Lockeridge, from where he collaborated with Bertrand Russell on Principia Mathematica.
