= Lithic Studies Society =

Archaeological organization

The Lithic Studies Society (LSS) is an international society founded in 1979 to advance "knowledge of, and education and research in, lithic studies." The Society's members and contributors have diverse interests, spanning the Palaeolithic, Mesolithic, Neolithic and Prehistory in general, up to historic periods across the world. The Society provides a convivial forum for the exchange of ideas and information and produces. It regularly holds lectures, day meetings, conferences and field trips, publishes an annual peer-reviewed journal (Lithics) and occasional thematic volumes. Additionally the society promotes the highest standards of lithics research and reporting, and advocates and contributes to policies relevant to lithic studies.

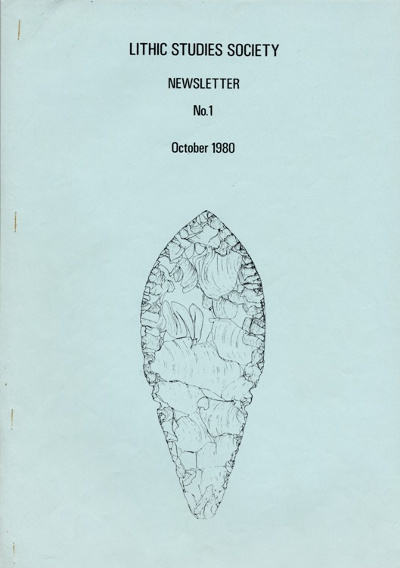
The cover of first journal of the Lithic Studies Society from 1980 featuring a Class 2 long-tanged British dagger

== Lithics ==
Lithics
- Language: English

Standard abbreviations
- ISO 4: Lithics

Indexing
- ISSN: 0262-7817
- OCLC no.: 477855038

Lithics: The Journal of The Lithic Studies Society or simply Lithics is the Society's annual, peer-reviewed journal first published in 1980. It is devoted to publishing research which enhances our understanding of past societies through the study of stone tools. Published in the spring of each year, Lithics contains research articles, as well as shorter communications, book reviews, bibliography of recent publications relevant to lithic studies, and news of the Society's related activities. Prior to 2004 the publication was known as The Newsletter of the Lithic Studies Society.

== Chairs ==
The seniormost office of the society- Chair has been occupied by many noteworthy prehistorians in the nearly 50 year long history of the LSS.

Chairs of the Lithic Studies Society.
Chairperson	Years
Mike Pitts	1979-1983
Alan Saville	1983-1990
John Wymer	1990-1994
Frances Healy	1994-1999
Nick Ashton	1999-2004
Francis Wenban-Smith	2004-2008
Hugo Anderson-Whymark	2008-2012
Laura Basell	2012-2014
Olaf Bayer	2014-2016
Claire Harris	2016-2018
Rob Davis	2018-2022
Josephine Mills	2022-2024
Ann Bojko	2024-

== Occasional Papers ==
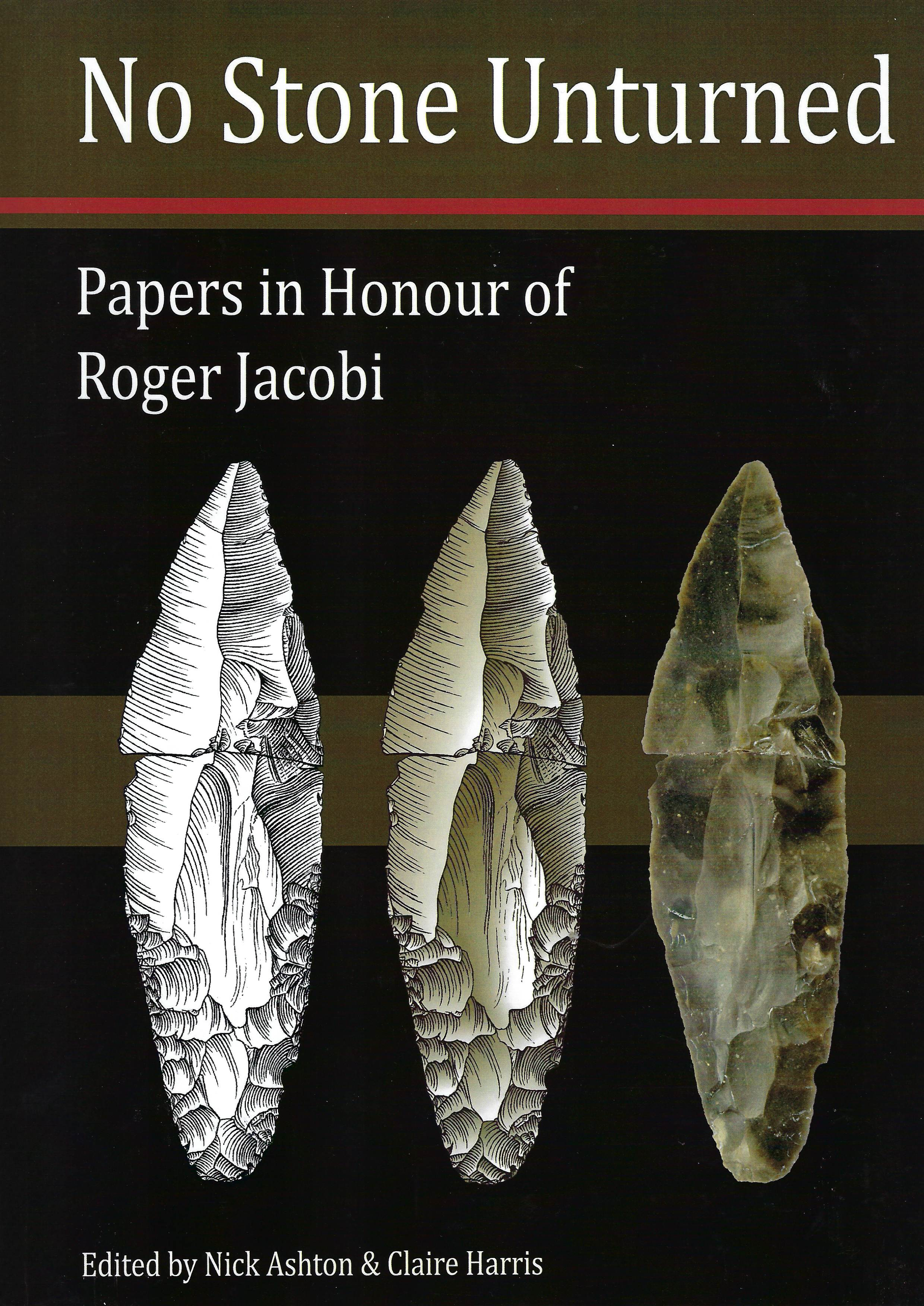
Example of an Occasional Paper: No Stone Unturned. Papers in Honour of Roger Jacobi. Lithic Studies Society Occasional Papers 9

The society has to date published nine Occasional Papers.

- Occasional Paper 1: 1980 Late Upper Palaeolithic/ Mesolithic Type List (Part 1)
- Occasional Paper 2: 1984 Late Upper Palaeolithic/ Mesolithic Type List (Part 2)
- Occasional Paper 3: 1988 The Illustration of Lithic Artefacts
- Occasional Paper 4: 1994 Stories in Stone
- Occasional Paper 5: 1995 Lithics in Context
- Occasional Paper 6: 1998 Stone Age Archaeology. Essays in Honour of John Wymer
- Occasional Paper 7: 2001 Palaeolithic Archaeology of the Solent River
- Occasional Paper 8: 2004 Lithics in Action
- Occasional Paper 9: 2010 No Stone Unturned. Papers in Honour of Roger Jacobi

== Bursaries and Grants ==
The Society offers three bursaries and one grant. Applications for the awards are open to students, academics and others engaged in lithics professionally or as a hobby. The bursaries and grant may be used towards excavation expenses, fieldwork, study of collections, and participation in a conference or travel, but a case may be made for other uses. Each award has various conditions and limits but can all be used to support activities in the UK or abroad.

=== The John Wymer Bursary ===
To commemorate John Wymer and his contribution to archaeology, the Society created the John Wymer Bursary, also referred to as the Wymer Bursary in 2007. It is awarded annually to support any individual to further an interest in lithic-related study. The value of the bursary is presently £250.

=== The Roger Jacobi Bursary ===
To commemorate prehistorian and founding member of the society, Roger Jacobi the Society created The Roger Jacobi Bursary or simply The Jacobi Bursary. It is directly funded by sales of the volume of papers published in his name since 2015. The bursary's value is £250.

=== The Alan Saville Grant ===
The Alan Saville Grant, created to commemorate the prehistorian and founding member of the society, Alan Saville has been awarded since 2019. Also known as The Saville Grant, its goal is to encourage engagement with a wider audience by supporting lithics research undertaken by individuals or groups. Its current value is £500.

=== The Student Conference Fund ===
The Student Conference Fund is dedicated to students to aid in covering conference costs including travel, accommodation and participation. The value of the fund is set to be £200 and will be made available after 2026.
