= Nympsfield Long Barrow =

Barrow remains in England

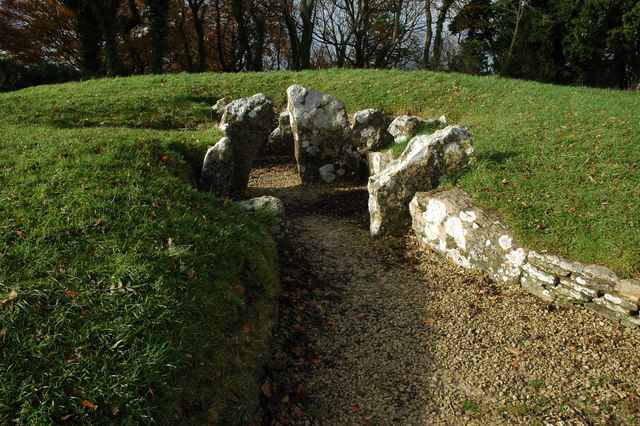
- The tomb in 2008
- Interactive map of Nympsfield Long Barrow
- 51.71025°N 2.29970°W
- Type: Grave
- Location: England, United Kingdom

History
- Built: c. 2800 BC

Site notes
- Material: Stone

The Nympsfield Long Barrow is the remains of a Neolithic burial site or barrow, located close to the village of Nympsfield in Gloucestershire, South West England.

It lies at the edge of a woods, and is now the location of a picnic site. It is one of the earliest examples of a barrow with separate chambers. It was constructed around 2800 BC.

It is a Scheduled Monument (number 22857) in the guardianship of English Heritage.

Many of the finds from excavations at this site are now in the Gloucester City Museum.

== Location ==
Nympsfield Long Barrow is sited to the southeast of the B4066 road, around 6 miles (10 km) southwest of Stroud, and approximately 14 miles (23 km) west of Cirencester within Coaley Peak Country Park. The tumulus is no longer visible. In common with other barrows in the area it lies on the edge of a scarp of Jurassic oolitic (egg stone) limestone.

== Layout ==
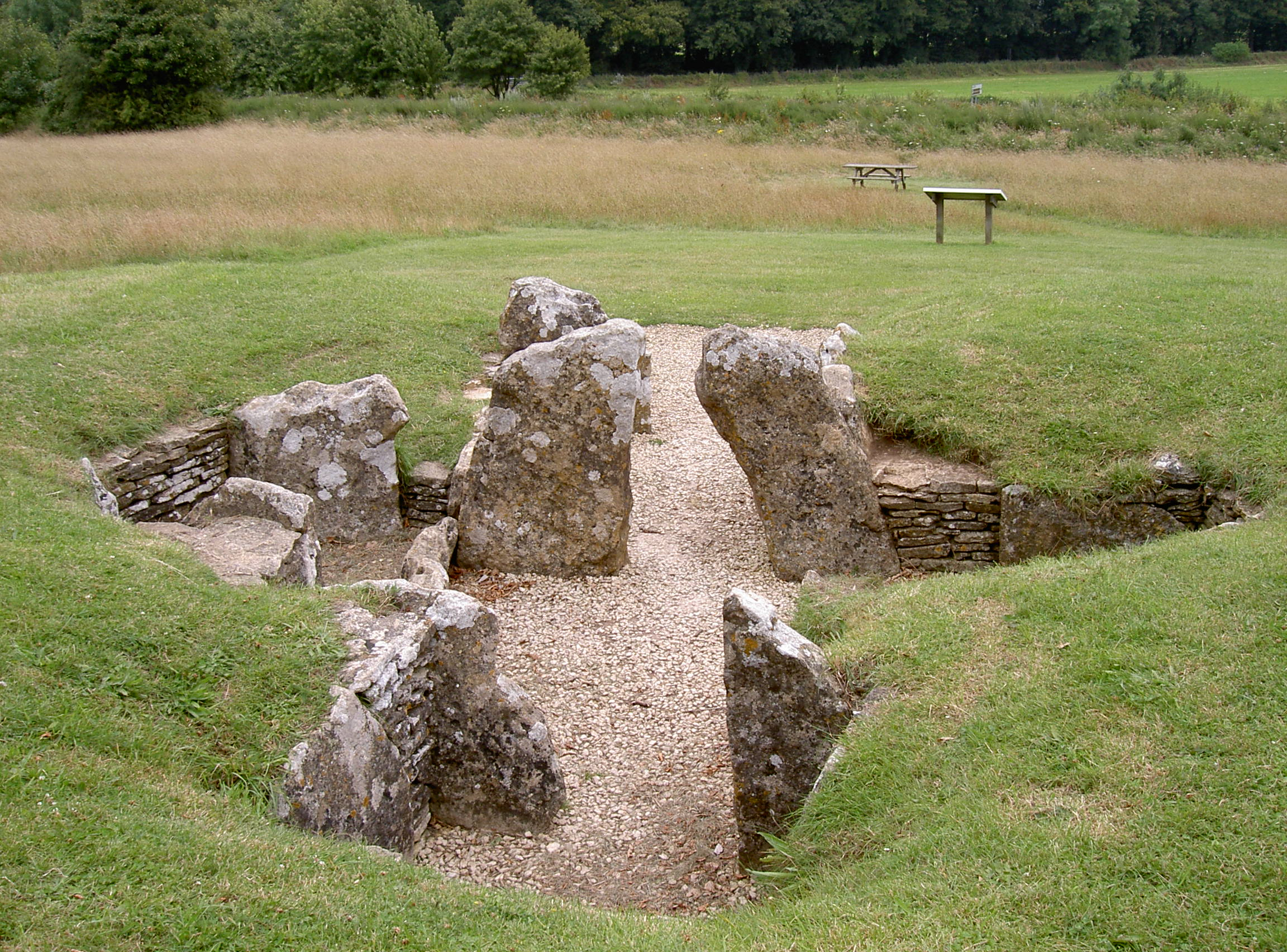

The barrow is 27 by 18 metres (89 ft × 59 ft) in size and overall trapezoidal in shape. There is evidence of curving walls behind the east entrance, which leads into a square forecourt area, opening onto a central passage. Three chambers lead off this passage, two larger chambers to either side and one small one to the end, divided off by constricting stones to restrict access. A small part of the north chamber was separated off to form a cist. The long axis of the barrow is orientated in a southeast to northwest direction.

== History of excavation ==
The barrow has been excavated on three separate occasions, in 1862 by Buckman with the Cotteswold Naturalist's Field Club, in 1937 by Elsie Clifford and in 1974 by A. Saville. 23 bodies were discovered within the site. The remains of cremated children were placed in a separate cist. It was noted that the majority had common medical problems including infections in the mouth and gums, and abscesses. It is believed that, following interment, the bodies were left for a predetermined length of time, before a specific event took place, where the tomb was sealed over permanently. Haematite was found in the mound, possibly used as face-paint to make the dead appear alive.

The digs uncovered the remains of fires, and pig bones, within the forecourt, indicating that ritualized meals were eaten, during burial ceremonies. Some dog bones were also uncovered on the site, but it is uncertain whether they age back to the original site, or from a later date. At the time of the first excavation, Nympsfield was thought to be unique in being the only chambered barrow in which bones from birds had been discovered, although several other such sites have now been discovered, such as the Tomb of the Eagles in the Orkney Islands.

A leaf-shaped arrow-head and shards of pottery were also discovered. Two reconstructed vessels, a bowl and a necked jar, have been attributed to Ebbsfleet ware. Quartz pebbles were noted amongst the blocking deposits at both ends of the mound. This is a common feature of many long barrows in the Cotswold-Severn Group, in north Wales and northern and central Ireland and is thought to have a symbolic meaning.

Nympsfield Long Barrow is part of the Cotswold–Severn group of monuments. It is similar in layout to the chambered tombs of Uley and Notgrove. It lies close to the so-called "Soldier's Grave" round barrow. The site was also occupied in both the Iron Age and Roman times.
