= Roger Jacobi =

British archaeologist

Roger Michael Jacobi
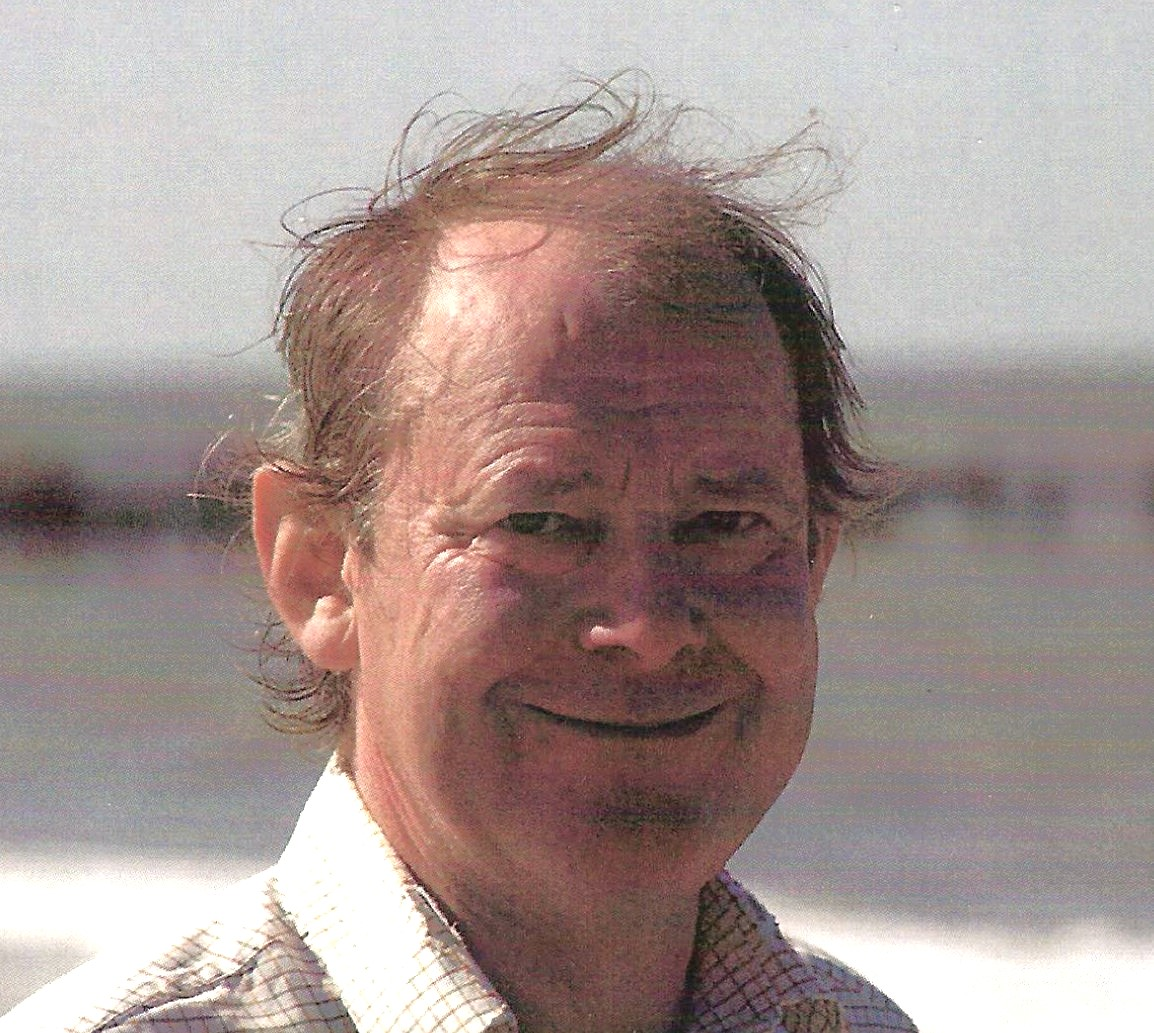
- Roger Jacobi in the early 2000s
- Born: 16 February 1947; Ealing, England
- Died: 9 December 2009 (aged 62); Watford, England
- Known for: Palaeolithic and Mesolithic Artefact (PaMELA) database
- Awards: Baguley Award (2004)

Academic background
- Education: Jesus College, Cambridge
- Thesis: Aspects of the post-Glacial archaeology of England (1975)

Academic work
- Discipline: Archaeology
- Sub-discipline: Palaeolithic archaeology; Mesolithic archaeology
- Institutions: Lancaster University; University of Nottingham; British Museum

Roger Michael Jacobi (16 February 1947 – 9 December 2009) was a British archaeologist specialising in Palaeolithic and Mesolithic Britain. Known for his encyclopaedic knowledge of British prehistory, Jacobi authored several key synthetic volumes and worked to catalogue, sequence and reanalyse collections from across Britain and northwestern Europe. Sections of his extensive personal archive were posthumously published as the Palaeolithic and Mesolithic Artefact (PaMELA) database. He studied archaeology at Jesus College, Cambridge, and held positions at Lancaster University, the University of Nottingham, and the British Museum.

== Education and career ==
Jacobi was born in Ealing on 16 February 1947, to an English mother and German father. He attended Merchant Taylors' School, Northwood. There he took an early interest in archaeology, joining both the school's archaeology society and the Prehistoric Society, and volunteering at excavations at a Roman site. He went on to study archaeology and anthropology at the University of Cambridge and completed his doctorate as a fellow of Jesus College. Thomas Higham described Jacobi's doctoral thesis, on Mesolithic Britain, as "a monumental and important piece of work that is unlikely to be matched in terms of its detail and broad sweep". It was examined by Paul Mellars.

After completing his doctorate, Jacobi taught Palaeolithic archaeology at Lancaster University and the University of Nottingham. He left Nottingham in 1994, first for a series of curatorial posts at the British Museum, then from 2001 a permanent research position with the 'Ancient Human Occupation of Britain' project.

== Research ==
Jacobi was known for his encyclopaedic knowledge of British prehistory. He never adopted computers, preferring to maintain his large archive of information from visits to sites and collections across the country in index cards and longhand notes. Starting with his doctoral thesis, he wrote several key synthetic volumes on the Palaeolithic and Mesolithic of the British Isles, including chapters in the Council for British Archaeology's regional series and the Gazetteer of Mesolithic Sites in England and Wales (1977). The latter volume was "the most widely available and accessible published data source for the Mesolithic period in Britain" for many years, forming the basis of the Mesolithic section of the National Monuments Record, and eventually only superseded with the posthumous publication of Jacobi's personal archive.

Much of Jacobi's work involved reanalysing old collections. He discovered one of the two known Aurignacian bone points in Britain during a visit to the Bristol Museum, misidentified amongst a collection of stone tools. On another occasion, he was able to refit two pieces of chipped stone from entirely different collections. He also used archival research to reconstruction the history of excavations at Pinhole Cave and Kents Cavern. From 2006, Jacobi collaborated with the Oxford Radiocarbon Accelerator Unit to refine the Palaeolithic and Mesolithic chronology of the British Isles and northwestern Europe using the new method of ultrafiltration radiocarbon dating. This work led to several important results, including the dating of sequences from key Palaeolithic sites such as Geißenklösterle, Fumane, La Ferrassie, and Pataud.

Jacobi was also active in field archaeology. He excavated at Gough's Cave between 1987 and 1992 and at Happisburgh from 2006 until his death.

== Honours and legacy ==
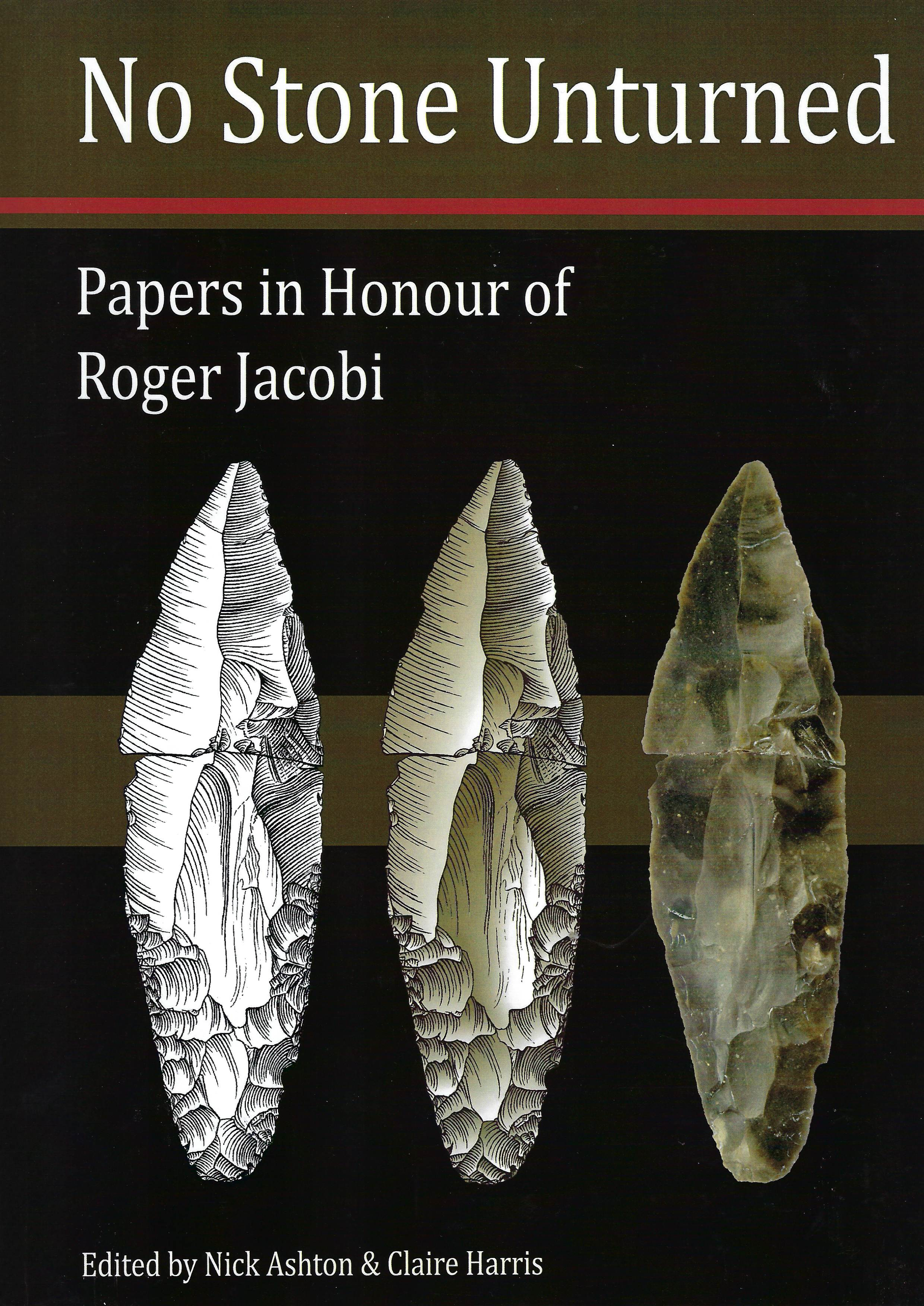
Monograph published in honour of Jacobi in 2010: No Stone Unturned. Papers in Honour of Roger Jacobi. Lithic Studies Society Occasional Papers 9

Jacobi's 2004 paper on the Late Upper Palaeolithic of Gough's Cave won that year's Baguley Award from the Prehistoric Society. Higham described the paper as a "magnificent contribution [...] careful, methodical and hugely detailed; the product of years of careful observation and basic hard work."

Jacobi died of cancer on 9 December 2009. A memorial event was organised by the Society of Antiquaries of London in 2010. A volume in his memory, No Stone Unturned: Papers in Honour of Roger Jacobi, edited by Nick Ashton and Claire Harris, was published by the Lithic Studies Society in 2015. Proceeds from the sale of the book were used to set up a Jacobi Bursary for members of the Lithic Studies Society.

Jacobi maintained an extensive card index of Palaeolithic and Mesolithic sites, collections, and artefacts. After his death, Wessex Archaeology conducted an English Heritage-funded project to digitise this archive as the Palaeolithic and Mesolithic Artefact (PaMELA) database, published in 2014. The physical archive, together with Jacobi's large collection of correspondence, notes, illustrations and photographs, is curated by the British Museum at Franks House.

== Selected publications ==
- Jacobi, R. M. (2004). "The Late Upper Palaeolithic lithic collection from Gough's Cave, Cheddar, Somerset and human use of the cave". Proceedings of the Prehistoric Society. 70: 1–92. doi:10.1017/S0079497X00001110. S2CID 130558735.
- —; Higham, T. F. G.; Bronk Ramsey, C. (2006). "AMS radiocarbon dating of Middle and Upper Palaeolithic bone in the British Isles: improved reliability using ultrafiltration". Journal of Quaternary Science. 21 (5): 557–73. Bibcode:2006JQS....21..557J. doi:10.1002/jqs.1037. S2CID 128613381.
- — (2007). "A collection of Early Upper Palaeolithic artefacts from Beedings, near Pulborough and the context of similar finds from the British Isles". Proceedings of the Prehistoric Society. 73: 229–325. doi:10.1017/S0079497X00000098. S2CID 129492036.
- —; Higham, T. F. G. (2008). "The 'Red Lady' ages gracefully: New ultrafiltration AMS determinations from Paviland". Journal of Human Evolution. 55 (5): 898–907. doi:10.1016/j.jhevol.2008.08.007. PMID 18929395.
- —; Higham, T. F. G. (2009). "The early Lateglacial re-colonization of Britain: New radiocarbon evidence from Gough's Cave". Quaternary Science Reviews. 28: 1895–1913. doi:10.1016/j.quascirev.2009.03.006.
- —; Rose, J.; MacLeod, A.; Higham, T. F. G. (2009). "Revised radiocarbon ages on woolly rhinoceros (Coelodonta antiquitatis) from western central Scotland: significance for timing the extinction of woolly rhinoceros in Britain and the onset of the LGM in central Scotland". Quaternary Science Reviews. 28 (25–26): 2551–2556. Bibcode:2009QSRv...28.2551J. doi:10.1016/j.quascirev.2009.08.010.
- —; Higham, T. F. G.; Haesaerts, P.; Basell, L. (2010). "Radiocarbon chronology for the Early Gravettian of northern Europe: New AMS determinations for Maisières-Canal, Belgium". Antiquity. 84 (323): 26–40. doi:10.1017/S0003598X00099749. S2CID 163089681.
