= Horton Down Long Barrow =

British neolithic archaeological site

- Location within Wiltshire
- 51°23′28″N 1°53′27″E
- Type: Long Barrow
- Periods: Neolithic
- Location: England, United Kingdom
- Region: Wiltshire England

History
- Built: c. 3400 BC - c. 2400 BC

Scheduled monument
- Official name: Long barrow on Horton Down
- Designated: 16 July 1956
- Reference no.: 1013141

Horton Down Long Barrow is an Early Neolithic unchambered long barrow located near the village of Bishops Cannings in Wiltshire, England. The barrow is part of the larger Cotswold-Severn Group, a concentration of long barrows grouped in Western England.

== Name and etymology ==
Named for the nearby hamlet of Horton, the Long Barrow sits on agricultural land. The immediate area is home to multiple Neolithic sites, including the Kitchen Barrow and an earthworks enclosure.

== Description ==
The long barrow has faced noticeable damage due to plowing. Original reports describe a low rectangular earthwork with ditches flanking both sides. The site also featured two small sarsen stones, which have been moved from their original location. Worked flint has also been recovered from the site.

The site was recorded in survey work by Arthur Passmore in 1921 but may have been excavated by John Thurnam in 1869. Thurnam describes a similar barrow, in which he found two skeletons.
