= Coaley Peak =

Picnic site and viewpoint in Gloucestershire, England

Coordinates: 51.71095°N 2.29955°W

Coaley Peak is a picnic site and viewpoint in the English county of Gloucestershire.

Coaley Peak.

Located about 4 miles (6.4 km) south-west of the town of Stroud overlooking the village of Coaley, Coaley Peak offers 12 acres (4.9 ha) of reclaimed farmland (now a wild flower meadow) with views over the Severn Vale and the Forest of Dean. It is next to a Woodland Trust beech wood and the National Trust's Frocester Hill site. The Cotswold Way long-distance footpath passes through the site. The site includes the excavated Neolithic burial site Nympsfield Long Barrow.

Coaley Peak was for many years a seasonal home to a community of new age travellers, who were evicted around 2002 to make way for more grassland.
