= East Kennett =

Village in Wiltshire, England

Coordinates: 51.406°N 1.831°W

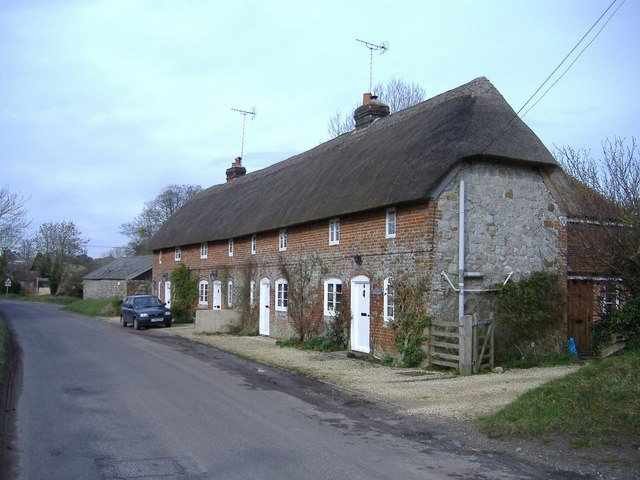
- A thatched terrace in East Kennett

- Location within Wiltshire
- Population: 84 (in 2011)
- OS grid reference: SU119675
- Civil parish: East Kennett
- Unitary authority: Wiltshire
- Ceremonial county: Wiltshire
- Region: South West
- Country: England
- Sovereign state: United Kingdom
- Post town: Marlborough
- Postcode district: SN8
- Dialling code: 01672
- Police: Wiltshire
- Fire: Dorset and Wiltshire
- Ambulance: South Western
- UK Parliament: East Wiltshire

East Kennett is a village and civil parish in Wiltshire, England, 5 miles (8.0 km) west of Marlborough. The United Kingdom Census 2011 recorded a parish population of 84.

The River Kennet forms most of the northern boundary of the parish, and the village lies close to the river. The neighbouring village of West Kennett is on the opposite bank a short distance upstream, in Avebury parish.

== History ==
Evidence of prehistoric activity includes a Neolithic long barrow, probably a communal burial site, on a hillside south of the present village; this monument is part of the Stonehenge and Avebury World Heritage Site. Further south, a circle of sarsen stones is possibly from the Bronze Age. The Ridgeway, an ancient trackway, passes through East Kennet village. Some 600 metres north of the village, at Overton Hill, the trackway becomes the Ridgeway National Trail which runs northeast as far as Buckinghamshire.

The Domesday Book of 1086 recorded holdings in Chenete, the area which later became East and West Kennett. There was a church at East Kennett in the 12th century and by 1291 it was a separate parish.

A schoolhouse was built opposite the manor house in 1857 with support from Maria and Ann Mathews, daughters of the owner of the house. Maria gave a large endowment in 1878 and the school became known as Miss Mathews' School. After her death in 1882 it became a Church of England elementary school, and pupils of all ages attended until 1924 when older children transferred to Avebury or West Overton. In 1990 the school federated with the school at Lockeridge, as numbers at both schools were low; the combined school was named Kennet Valley and the East Kennet site housed the upper years, in buildings behind the original. This site closed in 2011 after accommodation at Lockeridge was increased.

The church benefice was united with Avebury in 1923; a further rearrangement in 1929 formed the benefice of Overton and Fyfield with East Kennett.

== Notable buildings ==
Manor Farmhouse, opposite the church, is dated 1630 with extensions added in the 18th, 19th and 20th centuries. The older part is constructed from the local sarsen sandstone.

East Kennett Manor House is a three-storey brick house from the late 18th century, extended in the 19th century and again in 1925.

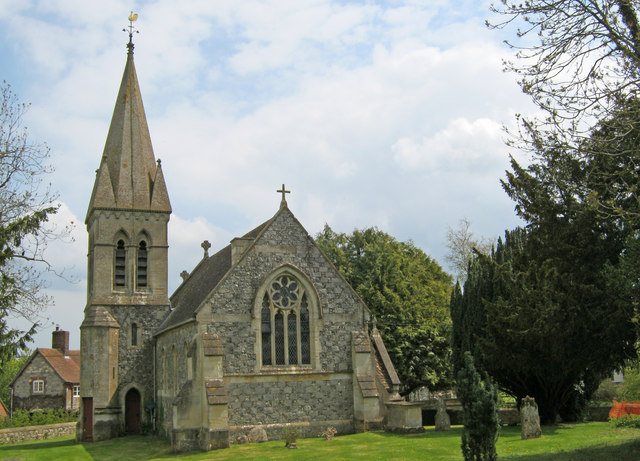
Christ Church

The Church of England parish church, Christ Church, was built in 1864 on the site of a 12th-century church. Today the parish is part of the Upper Kennet benefice.
