= Notgrove Long Barrow =

Archaeological site in Notgrove, Gloucestershire, England

Coordinates: 51°53′21.5″N 1°51′44″W

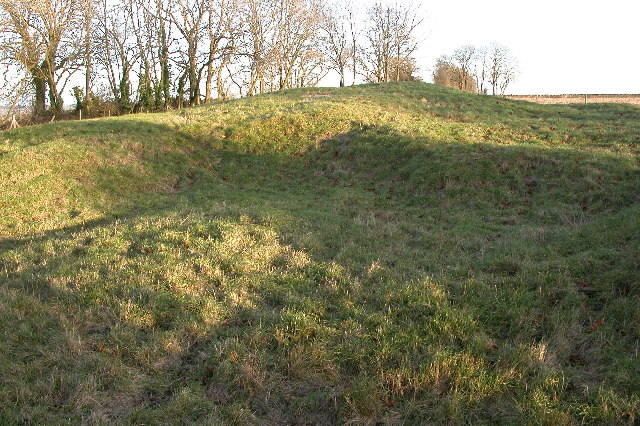
Notgrove Long Barrow

Notgrove Long Barrow is a prehistoric long barrow burial mound in Gloucestershire, England.

It consists of a large mound with a passage running through the centre and several small chambers opening off it. Human remains were interred in these chambers. It is unlikely that any of these remains are still within the mound, as the barrow was open for thousands of years before being sealed in 1976 to prevent further damage to the site.

The barrow was surveyed in 1974 and the dimensions were estimated at 46 metres (151 ft) long, 30 metres (98 ft) wide and 1.7 metres (5 ft 7 in) high.
