= Uley Long Barrow =

Long barrow in Gloucestershire, England

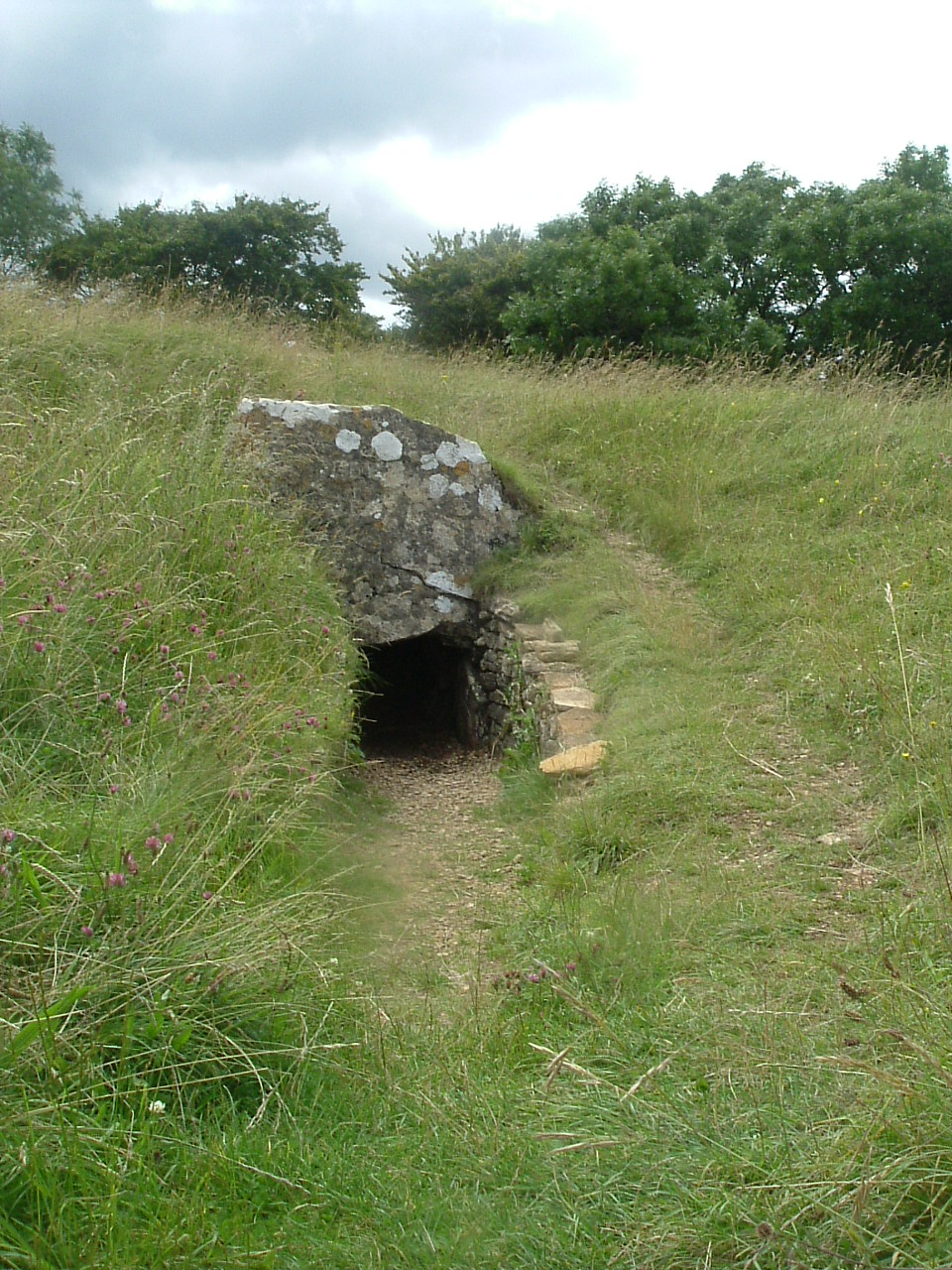
- The entrance to Uley Long Barrow

- Location in England
- 51°41′55″N 2°18′21″W
- Type: Transepted gallery grave
- Location: Gloucestershire, England
- OS grid reference: SO 78953 00034

History
- Built: c. 3000 BC

Site notes
- Material: Stone
- Height: 3 m (9.8 ft)
- Length: c. 37 m (121 ft)
- Width: c. 34 m (112 ft)

Scheduled monument
- Official name: Uley long barrow, also known as Hetty Pegler`s Tump, 400m south-east of Knapp Farm House
- Designated: 21 October 1921
- Reference no.: 1008195

The Uley Long Barrow, also known locally as Hetty Pegler's Tump, is a Neolithic burial mound near the village of Uley, Gloucestershire, England.

== Details ==
Although typically described as a long barrow, the mound is actually a transepted gallery grave. It was probably built before 3000 BC.

It measures around 37 metres (121 ft) long, 34 metres (112 ft) wide, and has a maximum height of 3 metres (9.8 ft). It contains a stone-built central passage with two chambers on each side and another at the end. The earthen mound is surrounded by a dry-stone revetting wall.

The barrow was archaeologically excavated in 1821, revealing the remains of fifteen skeletons and a later, intrusive Roman age burial above the northeast chamber. It was excavated again in 1854 by Dr John Thurnham, with subsequent repairs in 1871, 1891, and 1906. Two skulls went to Guy's Hospital in London and it is thought most of the other bones were buried in the churchyard of St Giles's in Uley.

"Tump" is a dialectical term for a small hill or mound of earth, and the tump is nicknamed after Hester, wife of the 17th-century landowner Henry Pegler. Hester died in 1694, and Henry in 1695. It is clearly signposted from the side of the nearby Crawley Hill (B4066 road) between Uley and Nympsfield. It is about 1.4 kilometres (0.87 mi) south of Nympsfield Long Barrow.

The barrow was reopened in 2011 after a short closure for essential health and safety work.

== Gallery ==
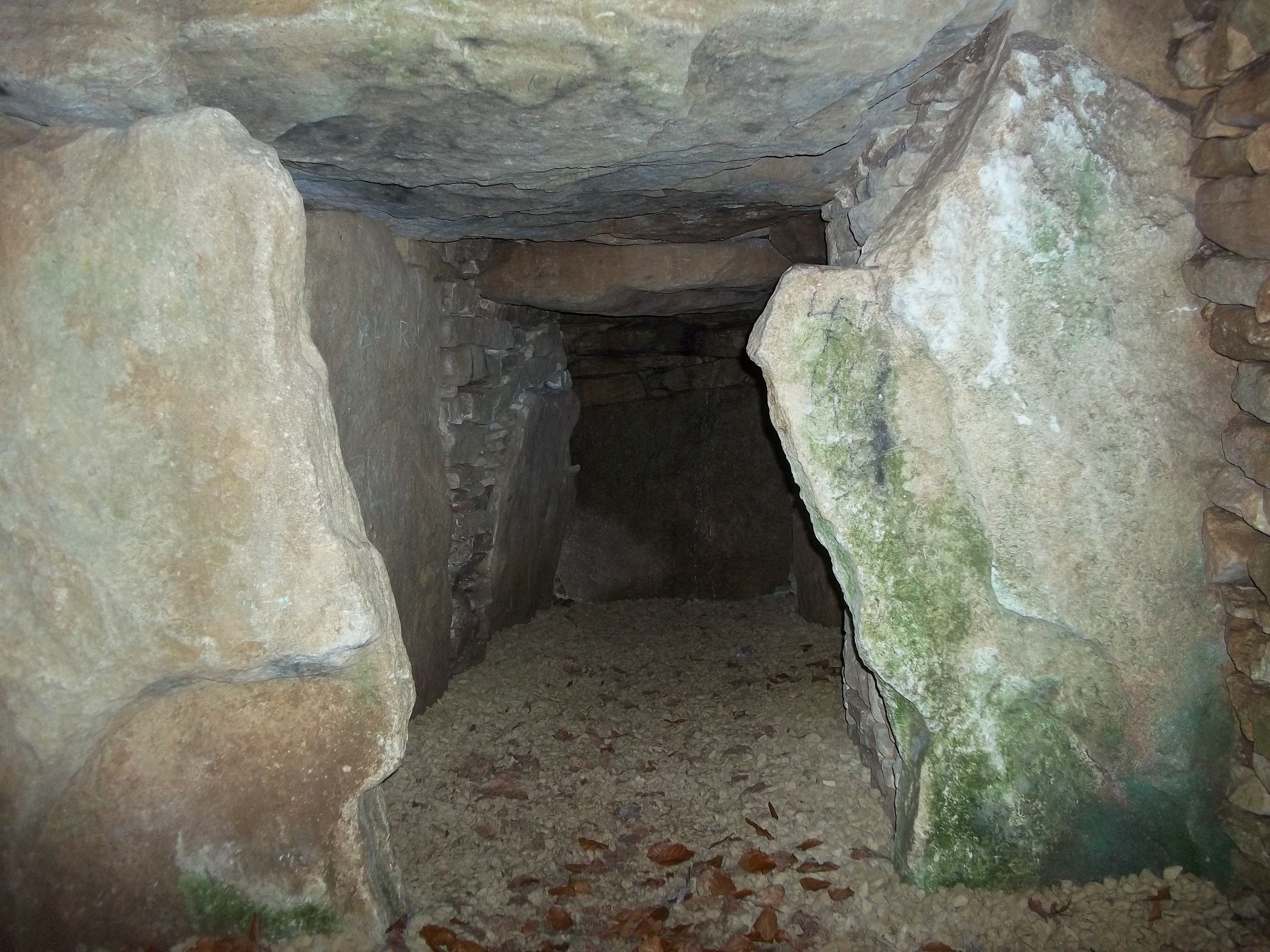
End chamber inside the barrow

== See also ==
- List of English Heritage properties
