= Bencombe =

Hamlet in Gloucestershire, England

Coordinates: 51.677°N 2.301°W

- Location within Gloucestershire
- OS grid reference: ST792976
- Civil parish: Uley
- District: Stroud
- Shire county: Gloucestershire
- Region: South West
- Country: England
- Sovereign state: United Kingdom
- Police: Gloucestershire
- Fire: Gloucestershire
- Ambulance: South Western

Bencombe is a hamlet made up of 9 mainly traditional stone cottages/houses in the parish of Uley and just south west of Owlpen on the edge of the Cotswolds in Gloucestershire, England.

Bencombe is located by taking the old Roman road to Tetbury/Cirencester (now called Lampern Hill) from Uley Road as you enter the village from the east. You can also go through Owlpen from the west and travel up and back down the valley into Bencombe.

From Bencombe you can see the historical Stouts Hill, Cam Peak, Downham Hill (Small Pox Hill), Uley Bury and the heart of Uley village including The Church of St Giles.

The Church of the Holy Cross in Owlpen is also visible.

There are a multitude of footpaths/bridleways around the valley, which is popular with hikers, horse riders and cyclists. Bencombe is included in an area of outstanding natural beauty and Uley features on the Cotswold Way. The road through Bencombe is regularly used by local cycling clubs for time trials due to the steepness of the hill which is often impassable during the winter snow/ice.
