= H. A. R. Gibb =

Scottish orientalist (1895–1971)

Sir H. A. R. Gibb FBA
- Born: Hamilton Alexander Rosskeen Gibb; 2 January 1895; Alexandria, Egypt
- Died: 22 October 1971 (aged 76); Shipston-on-Stour, Warwickshire, England
- Spouse: Helen Jessie Stark (m. 1922; died 1969)

Academic background
- Education: University of Edinburgh; School of Oriental Studies, London
- Influences: Sir Thomas Walker Arnold; Sir Edward Denison Ross

Academic work
- Discipline: History
- Institutions: St John's College, Oxford; Harvard University
- Notable students: Wilfred Cantwell Smith, Saiyid Nurul Hasan

Sir Hamilton Alexander Rosskeen Gibb FBA (2 January 1895 – 22 October 1971), known as H. A. R. Gibb, was a Scottish historian and Orientalist.

== Early life and education ==
Gibb was born on Wednesday, 2 January 1895, in Alexandria, Egypt, to Alexander Crawford Gibb, the son of John Gibb of Gladstone, Renfrewshire, Scotland, and Jane Ann Gardner of Greenock, Scotland. His father died in 1897, following which his mother took up a teaching position in Alexandria. Hamilton returned to Scotland for his formal education at the age of five: first, four years of private tuition, after which he started at the Royal High School, Edinburgh in 1904, staying until 1912. His education was focused on classics, though it included French, German, and physical sciences. In 1912, Hamilton matriculated at University of Edinburgh, joining the new honours program in Semitic languages (Hebrew, Arabic, and Aramaic). Hamilton's mother died in 1913 while he was studying in his second year at university. He had two brothers, Euston Gibb and Archibald Gibb.(family knowledge)

== Military service ==
During World War I, Gibb broke off his studies at the University of Edinburgh to serve for the Royal Artillery of the United Kingdom in France from February 1917 and for several months in Italy as a commissioned officer. He was commissioned at the age of 19.

He was awarded a "war privilege" undergraduate Master of Arts (MA) because of his service until the Armistice of 11 November 1918.

== Academic career ==
After the war Gibb studied Arabic at SOAS, University of London, gaining his postgraduate MA in 1922. His MA thesis, published later by the Royal Asiatic Society of Great Britain and Ireland as a monograph, was on the Muslim conquest of Transoxiana.

From 1921 to 1937 Gibb taught Arabic literature at the then School of Oriental Studies, guided by Professor Thomas Arnold, becoming a professor there in 1930. During this time he was an editor of the Encyclopaedia of Islam. Among his students was the British Arabist and Reader in Arabic, James Heyworth-Dunne. In 1937 Gibb succeeded David Samuel Margoliouth as Laudian Professor of Arabic with a Fellowship at St John's College, Oxford, where he stayed for eighteen years.

In 1955, Gibb became the James Richard Jewett Professor of Arabic and University Professor at Harvard University. He became director of the Center for Middle East Studies in 1957, and retired in 1963.

H. A. R. Gibb was one of the trustees of the E. J. W. Gibb Memorial, an organisation which since 1905 has published the Gibb Memorial Series.

== Research ==
Gibb worked in three areas, Arabic literature and language, Islamic history and institutions, and Islam. After The Arab Conquests in Central Asia, his first major work was Arabic Literature – An Introduction (1926). His most important work on Islam was Modern Trends in Islam (1947) and Mohammedanism: An Historical Survey (1949), later republished as Islam: An Historical Survey. One of his major late works was Studies on the Civilization of Islam (1962),

== Personal life ==
Also in 1922 Gibb married Helen Jessie Stark. They had one son, Ian (1923–2005), and one daughter, Dorothy (1926–2006, now Dorothy Greenslade).

Gibb died on 22 October 1971.

== Associations ==
- Fellow of British Academy, Danish Academy, American Philosophical Society
- Honorary fellow of American Academy of Arts and Sciences, Medieval Academy of America
- Member of Academy of the Arabic Language in Cairo, Institut d'Egypte (Associate Member), Arab Academy of Damascus (Honorary), Iraqi Academy of Sciences

== Bibliography ==
- The Arab Conquests in Central Asia (1923), The Royal Asiatic Society.
- Arabic Literature – An Introduction (Oxford University Press, H. Milford, 1926; new edition, Clarendon Press, 1963; Oxford Paperbacks edition, Oxford University Press, 1974).
- Ibn Batuta, 1304–1377 Travels in Asia and Africa 1325-I354, trans. and selected by Gibb, Hamilton Alexander Roskeen (London: Routledge, 1929), (Arabic: Tuhfat al-'anzar fi ghara'ib al-'amsar).
- Travels in Asia and Africa, 1325–1354 (1929), translated and selected with an introduction and notes, R. M. McBride. ISBN 81-206-0809-7
- Note by Professor H. A. R. Gibb (1939), from Arnold J. Toynbee, A Study of History, Part I. C I (b) Annex I, p. 400-02.
- Modern Trends in Islam (1947).
- Mohammedanism: An Historical Survey (1949) retitled Islam: An Historical Survey (1980), Oxford.
- Islamic Society and the West with Harold Bowen (vol. 1 1950, vol. 2 1957).
- Shorter Encyclopedia of Islam (1953), edited with J. H. Kramers, Brill.
- The Encyclopaedia of Islam (1954– ), new ed. Edited by a number of leading orientalists, including Gibb, under the patronage of the International Union of Academies. Leiden: Brill, along with that edited by J. H. Kramers, and E. Levi-Provençal.
- "Islamic Biographical Literature," (1962) in Historians of the Middle East, eds. Bernard Lewis and P. M. Holt, Oxford U. Press.
- Studies on the Civilization of Islam (1962), Princeton U. Press
- The Damascus Chronicle of the Crusades. Extracted and translated from the Chronicle of ibn al-Qalānisi, Luzac & Company, London, 1932.
