= Patrick Browne (judge) =

English judge (1907–1996)

Sir Patrick Browne PC, OBE, TD
- Browne in 1967

Deputy Chairman of the Essex County Quarter Sessions
- In office 1963–1965

Lord Justice of Appeal
- In office 1974–1980

Personal details
- Born: Patrick Reginald Evelyn Browne; 28 May 1907 Cambridge, Cambridgeshire, England
- Died: 1 October 1996 (aged 89)
- Spouse(s): Evelyn Sophie Alexandra (m. 1931; died 1966) Lena Atkinson (m. 1977)
- Children: Harriet Crawford
- Parent(s): Edward Granville Browne; Alice Caroline Browne
- Education: Eton College; Pembroke College, Cambridge
- Occupation: Judge

Military service
- Allegiance: United Kingdom
- Branch/service: Royal Horse Artillery
- Years of service: 1939-1945
- Rank: Lieutenant-General

Sir Patrick Reginald Evelyn Browne, PC, OBE, TD (28 May 1907 – 1 October 1996) was an English judge, who was a Lord Justice of Appeal between 1974 and 1980.

== Biography ==
Patrick Browne was born in Cambridge, the son of Edward Granville Browne, a leading Cambridge Orientalist, and of Alice Caroline Browne, daughter of the historian Francis Henry Blackburne Daniell. His grandfather was Sir Benjamin Chapman Browne, head of the shipbuilding and engineering firm R. & W. Hawthorn, Leslie and Company. His mother died in 1925 and his father died the following year.

Browne was educated at Eton College, before going up to Pembroke College, Cambridge (honorary fellow, 1975), where his father had been a fellow, in 1925, the year of his mother's death. He read Law and was called to the bar by the Inner Temple in 1931. The same year, he married Evelyn Sophie Alexandra (d 1966), daughter of the archaeologist Sir Charles Walston, a family friend. They had two daughters, the elder of which was Harriet Crawford. After Evelyn's death, he married Lena Atkinson in 1977.

On the outbreak of the Second World War in 1939, he joined the Royal Horse Artillery, and was employed in the planning of air defence at the War Office, becoming a GSO1 and a lieutenant-colonel. He was appointed an OBE (Military Division) in 1945.

Returning to the bar, Browne acquired a large civil practice, mainly in planning law and parliamentary work. He became a Queen's Counsel in 1960, and was Deputy Chairman of the Essex County Quarter Sessions from 1963 to 1965. He also edited the second edition of Shawcross and Beaumont's Air Law.

In 1965, he was appointed a Justice of the High Court and assigned to the Queen's Bench Division, receiving the customary knighthood. He was the first instance judge in the seminal case Anisminic Ltd v Foreign Compensation Commission, where he found in favour of the plaintiffs. Reversed by the Court of Appeal, his judgment was restored by the House of Lords. Unusually, his judgment in full was annexed to the Lords' judgment. He was made a Lord Justice of Appeal in 1974, and was sworn of the Privy Council.
