= Gibb Memorial Series =

The "E. J. W. Gibb Memorial" Series (abbreviation: GMS) is an orientalist book series with important works of Persian, Turkish and Arab history, literature, philosophy and religion, including many works in English translation. Some works were included in the UNESCO Collection of Representative Works.

It is dedicated to the memory of the Scottish orientalist Elias John Wilkinson Gibb (1857-1901). The series was sponsored and funded by the E. J. W. Gibb Memorial Trust (originally known as the E. J. W. Gibb Memorial) and published from 1905 to 1997. The publishers in the early years were Luzac & Co., London and E. J. Brill, Leiden). From 1921 up until the 1970s Luzac & Co. became the sole publisher.

The series appeared in an old series – No. 1 (1905) - No. 25 (1927) – and a new series (NS) – No. 1 (1921) - No. 33 (1997). Some numbers of the series included several volumes.

In 2012 various titles were available from Oxbow Books, a book publishing and distribution firm in Oxford.

In 2022 the Edinburgh University Press was involved in the publishing and distribution of the titles in the Gibb Memorial Series.

== E. J. W. Gibb Memorial Trust ==
The following persons and firms were associated with the Trust when it was founded in 1902.

=== Original trustees ===
Jane (née Gilman) Gibb (E. J. W. Gibb's mother, died 1904)

Edward Granville Browne

Guy Le Strange

Henry Frederick Amedroz

Alexander George Ellis

Reynold A. Nicholson

Edward Denison Ross

=== Subsequent trustees ===
Ida W. E. (Ogilvy) Gregory (formerly Ida W. E. Gibb; nee Ida W. E. Rodriguez), who was E. J. W. Gibb's widow, was appointed in 1905 and gradually replaced Mrs. Jane Gibb.

Other subsequent trustees included prominent scholars such as "Charles A. Storey, Hamilton A. R. Gibb, Reuben Levy, Arthur J. Arberry, Alfred F. L. Beeston, Harold W. Bailey, Bernard Lewis, Ann K. S. Lambton, James D. Pearson, Geoffrey L. Lewis, and Robert B. Serjeant".

=== Clerk of the Trust ===
W. L. Raynes, of Cambridge

=== Publishers For The Trustees ===
E. J. Brill, Leyden.

Luzac & Co., London.
