= Uley =

Village in Gloucestershire, England

Coordinates: 51.68396°N 2.30515°W

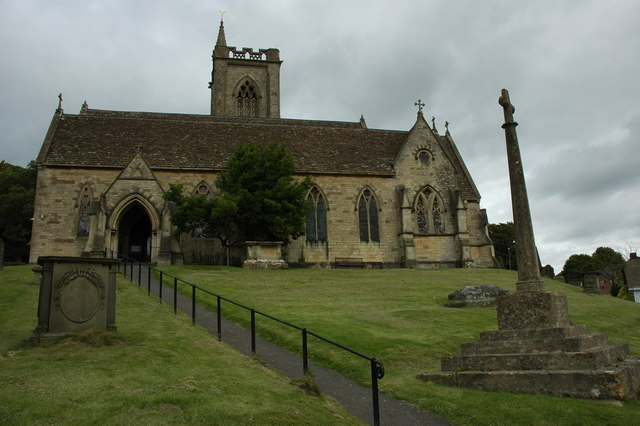
- St Giles' church

- Location within Gloucestershire
- Population: 1,151 (2011)
- OS grid reference: ST790984
- District: Stroud
- Shire county: Gloucestershire
- Region: South West
- Country: England
- Sovereign state: United Kingdom
- Post town: Dursley
- Postcode district: GL11
- Dialling code: 01453
- Police: Gloucestershire
- Fire: Gloucestershire
- Ambulance: South Western
- UK Parliament: Stroud

Uley /ˈjuːli/ is a village and civil parish in the county of Gloucestershire, England. The parish includes the hamlets of Elcombe and Shadwell and Bencombe, all to the south of the village of Uley, and the hamlet of Crawley to the north. The village is situated in a wooded valley in the Cotswold escarpment, on the B4066 road between Dursley and Stroud.

In 2011 the population of the civil parish was 1,151, but was much greater during the early years of the industrial revolution, when the village was renowned for producing blue cloth. The placename (recorded as Euuelege in the Domesday Book) probably signifies 'clearing in a yew wood'.

== History ==
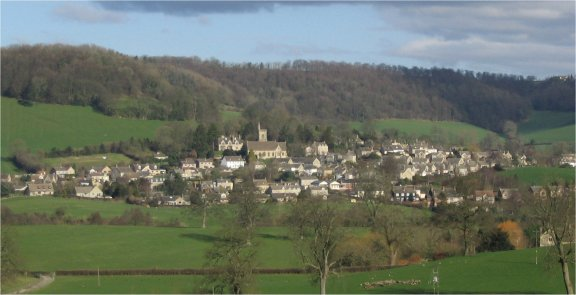
Uley, with Uley Bury rising behind it, as seen from Bencombe

The Romans built a temple at West Hill, near Uley, on the site of an earlier prehistoric shrine. Following the laying of a water main pipe there in 1976, many discoveries were made including numerous Roman writing tablets or lead curse tablets from the temple area. These writing tablets appear often to relate to theft, and here the mention of animals and farm implements is a regular theme. There is an ongoing, online project to catalogue all those found at West Hill. Other remains from this temple, including a fine stone head of Mercury, can now be seen in the British Museum. There were significant Roman villas nearby at Frocester, Kingscote, and Woodchester, and there is a little-known Roman villa beneath Cam Peak on the road into Dursley.

St Giles's Church near the village green was designed by the 19th-century architect Samuel Sanders Teulon. His building replaced an earlier church dating back to Norman times, which had in turn replaced a Saxon church. The nearby church of the Holy Cross at Owlpen also has Saxon origins: the church there was rebuilt in 1828 by Samuel Manning and enlarged and decorated in 1876 by James Piers St Aubyn. There were also non-conformist chapels at South St and Whitecourt until the early 1970s.

The village was once famous for its large number of pubs (around 14), lately reduced to a single hostelry (The Old Crown). Until the 1970s there was also a butcher's shop and a petrol station, these were subsequently replaced by antique shops and occasional restaurants, and now only a small village shop remains.

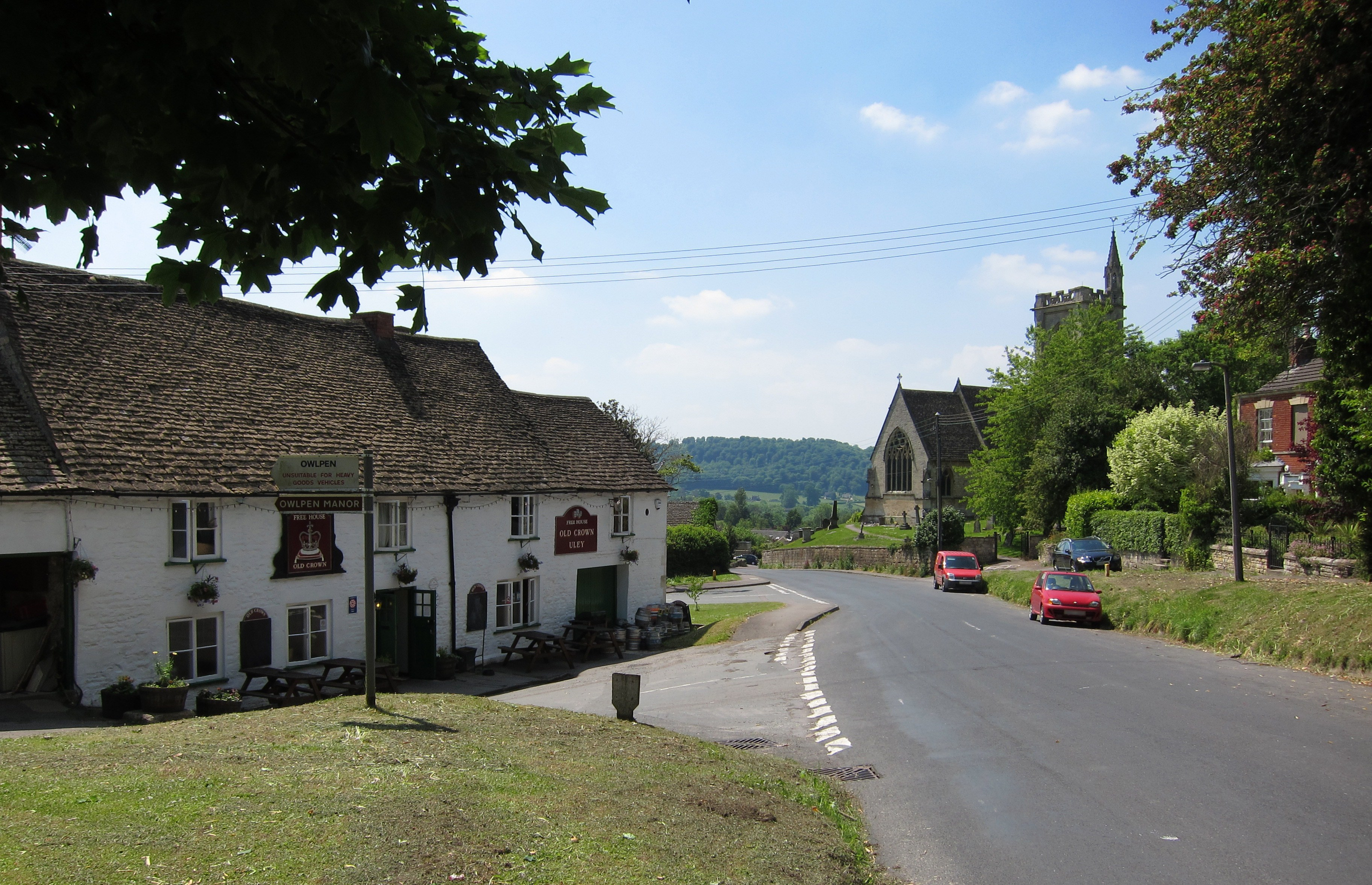
St Giles' church and the Old Crown pub, from the village green

The area surrounding Whitecourt appears to have some considerable historical significance, with long associations to the Osborne family and a possible Roman road transecting from Kingscote to the East via Bencombe, crossing the Ewelme brook close to the previous mill buildings opposite Stouts hill and then transiting what is now Lampern View before exiting west towards Cam/Coaley; elements clearly visible just uphill of Bencombe (as the road veers 90 degrees to the north) and to the West opposite the entrance to Angeston Grainge/Nursery (where it enters the wood as a paved and walled causeway.

The increased mechanisation of agriculture in the area (arable on top of the escarpment, sheep on it and cattle in the valleys) led to a gradual decline during the inter-war periods and this led to the construction of three local authority housing estates - South Street, Lampern View and Raglan Way. However, increased mobility following the construction of the M4 and the Severn Bridge in the mid-1960s, together with an influx of skilled/managerial/professional workers following the establishment of such facilities as the Berkeley power station, led to a steady gentrification of the village, witnessed by the construction of substantial detached homes, for example at Court Gardens, South Street and Green Close.

During the 1920s, Miss Edna Cunningham, brought a baby gorilla to Uley who she named John Daniel. He had been bought by her brother from a London department store. The gorilla was raised as a normal child by Miss Cunningham and he played with the village children. However, when John Daniel grew too large, Cunningham sold him to an American who told her he was to be homed in a special reserve in Florida. Instead he was sold to the Barnum & Bailey Circus to be exhibited at Madison Square Gardens in New York. John Daniel became extremely depressed. When Miss Cunningham heard he was gravely ill, she travelled to America but he died of pneumonia before she arrived. His body was stuffed, which remains on display at the American Museum of Natural History in New York.

== Economy ==
Uley Brewery was established in the 1980s, in a Grade II listed building that had been part of the 1833 Price Brewery which closed at the end of the 19th century. Its range of ales includes Old Spot Prize Ale, a 5% abv old ale, and Uley Bitter, a 4% abv cask bitter.

== Amenities and surrounding locality ==
The following amenities and attractions are available in and around the village:

- North of the village is a Neolithic burial mound known as Hetty Pegler's Tump or Uley Long Barrow.
- The Prema Arts Centre, founded in the 1970s, is located in a former Baptist Chapel in the village and offers educational courses in the arts and crafts, musical evenings, workshops, cultural events and evening classes in many subjects.
- Uley CofE VC primary school has around 100 pupils. Uley Primary School can be found in Woodstock Terrace. The school was rated 'good' by Ofsted and 'outstanding' by SIAS, both in 2012.
- A Reading Room (Library) burned down in the mid-1960s and has not been replaced.
- An ancient Iron Age hill fort called Uley Bury lies just above the village. The Cotswold Way, a popular trail path, runs close by.
- Downham Hill lies just to the west. It is also known as 'Smallpox Hill' because of the smallpox isolation facility that stood on the top of the hill many years ago. It is believed to be among the oldest isolation hospitals in England. Masonry from the buildings remains visible at the site. Near the hilltop are remnants of a tower-like dwelling constructed in 1346 during the reign of Edward III. Area to the north of the hill was used for rabbit breeding during the middle ages.
- To the east is Owlpen Manor, a Tudor manor house connected with the Arts and Crafts movement, mainly built from the mid-fifteenth to early seventeenth centuries, but dating back to Saxon times. It was repaired by Norman Jewson in 1925–26, after one hundred years of neglect. Today it is a home of the Mander family.
- Stouts Hill, a neo-Gothic country house just outside the village, was the birthplace of the Gloucestershire historian Samuel Rudder and of the distinguished Persian scholar Edward Granville Browne. Built for the Gyde family, from the 1770s it was a seat of the Lloyd-Baker family, who in the 20th century let the house as a preparatory school. It included amongst its alumni Mark Phillips, Stephen Fry and Rik Mayall, but closed down in 1979.

== People ==
- Brigadier Mike Dauncey lived in the village until his death in August 2017.
- Richard Clyburn invented an early adjustable spanner.

== See also ==
- Hundred of Uley, South Australia
- Uleybury - named after the village by Moses Bendle Garlick, a weaver from Uley, who migrated to Australia and settled just north of what is currently Adelaide in 1837
- Uley, South Australia

== Bibliography ==
- Ann Woodward and Peter Leach, The Uley Shrines: Excavation of a ritual complex on West Hill, Uley 1977-79 (1993), English Heritage, ISBN 1-85074-303-7
- Alan Saville, Uley Bury and Norbury Hillforts (1983), Western Archaeological Trust, ISBN 0-904918-20-3
- Ed. Alan Bebbington, A History of Uley, Gloucestershire (2003), The Uley Society, ISBN 0-9544525-0-X
- Eilert Ekwall, The Concise Oxford Dictionary of English Place-names 4th edition. Oxford University Press, 1960, ISBN 0-19-869103-3
