= Edward Burrow =

Edward Burrow may refer to:

- Edward Burrow (priest) (1785–1861), English divine and miscellaneous writer
- Edward Burrow (MP) for Cockermouth (UK Parliament constituency) in 1796
- Edward J. Burrow (1869–1934), British engraver and founder of Edward J. Burrow and Co., a printing and publishing firm

== See also ==
- Edward Burrough (1634–1663), English Quaker leader
- Edward Burroughs (1882–1934), British Anglican bishop
- Edward Burrows (1917–1998), American conscientious objector
- Edward Rupert Burrowes (1903–1966), Guyanese artist and art teacher
