= Guy Le Strange =

English scholar and Orientalist (1854–1933)

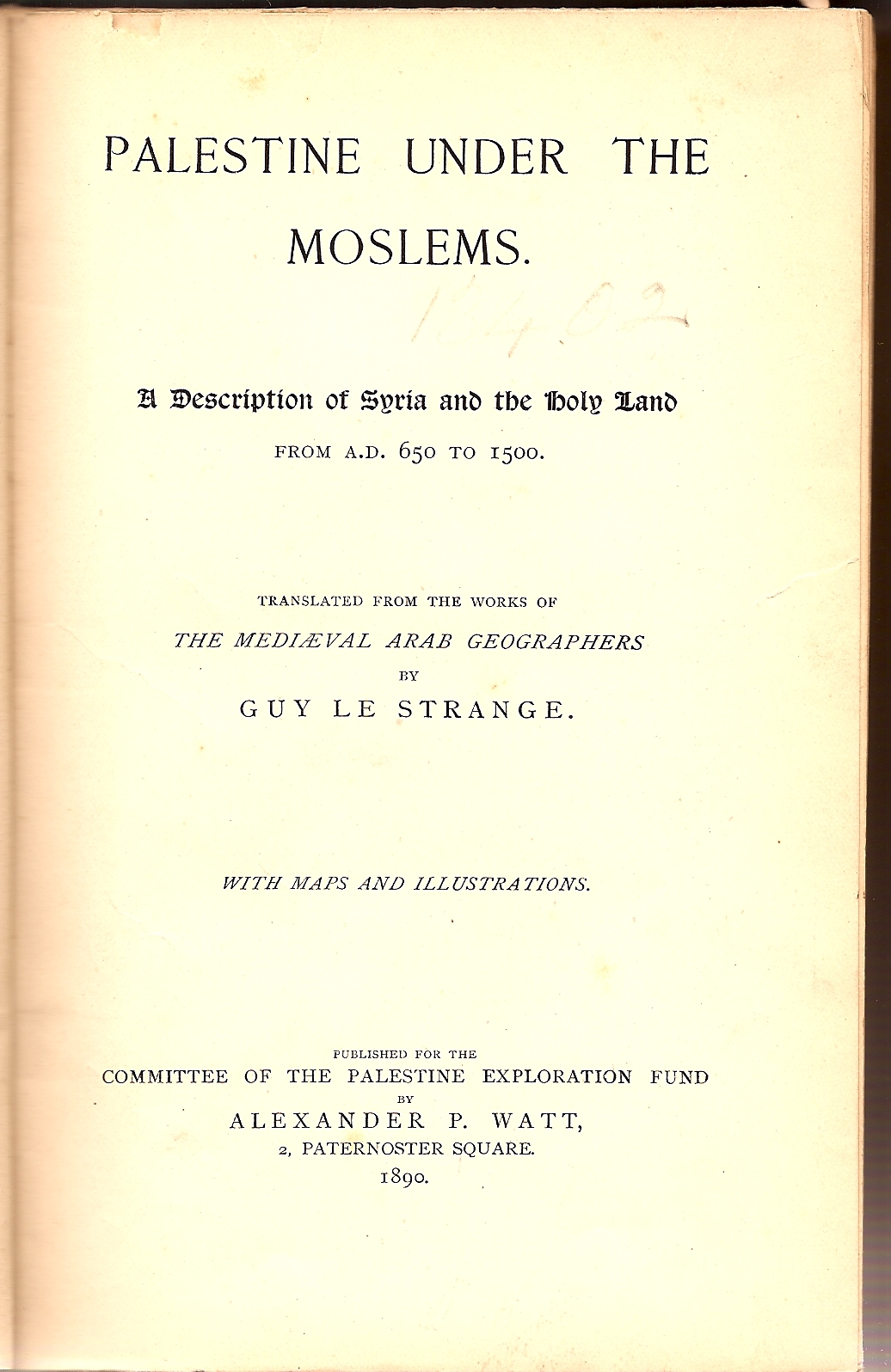
Palestine Under the Moslems: A Description of Syria and the Holy Land from A.D. 650 to 1500

Guy Le Strange (24 July 1854 – 24 December 1933) was a British Orientalist noted especially for his work in the field of the historical geography of the pre-modern Middle Eastern and Eastern Islamic lands, and his editing of Persian geographical texts. He was a scholar of the Persian, Arabic, and Spanish languages.

Le Strange was one of the original trustees of the E. J. W. Gibb Memorial, an organisation which since 1905 has published the Gibb Memorial Series.

He was born in Brussels, Belgium, the youngest child of Henry L'Estrange Styleman Le Strange of Hunstanton Hall, Norfolk, educated at Clifton College and died in Cambridge.

== Works ==
=== Books ===
- Schumacher, Gottlieb; Oliphant, Laurence; Le Strange, Guy (1889). Across the Jordan; being an exploration and survey of part of Hauran and Jaulan. London: Watt.
- Le Strange, Guy (1890). Palestine Under the Moslems: A Description of Syria and the Holy Land from A.D. 650 to 1500. London: Committee of the Palestine Exploration Fund. OCLC 1004386.
- Le Strange, Guy (1900). Baghdad during the Abbasid Caliphate: from contemporary Arabic and Persian sources. Oxford: Clarendon Press.
- Le Strange, Guy (1922). Baghdad during the Abbasid Caliphate: from contemporary Arabic and Persian sources (2 ed.). Oxford: Clarendon Press.
- Le Strange, Guy (1903). Mesopotamia and Persia under the Mongols, in the fourteenth century A.D. From the Nuzhat-al-Ḳulūb of Ḥamd-Allah Mustawfī. London: Royal Asiatic Society. OCLC 5235794.
- Le Strange, Guy (1905). The Lands of the Eastern Caliphate: Mesopotamia, Persia, and Central Asia, from the Moslem Conquest to the Time of Timur. New York: Barnes & Noble, Inc. OCLC 1044046. + Index

=== Articles ===
- Ibn al-Furat; Le Strange (1900). "The Death of the Last Abbasid Caliph, from the Vatican MS. of Ibn al-Furat". Journal of the Royal Asiatic Society. 32: 293–300.
