= Index Islamicus =

Index Islamicus (ISSN 1360-0982, ISSN 0308-7395) is a bibliography database of publications about Islam and the Muslim world, first compiled in 1956 by James Douglas Pearson. It is compiled by C.H. Bleaney & S. Sinclair and the School of Oriental and African Studies, London, and published by Brill Publishers.
