= Owlpen =

Village in Gloucestershire, England

Coordinates: 51.684°N 2.292°W

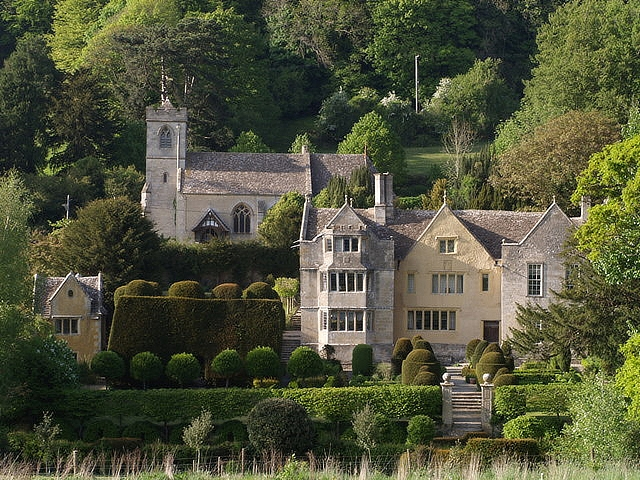

- Location within Gloucestershire
- Population: 32 (2004 census)
- OS grid reference: ST799984
- District: Stroud
- Shire county: Gloucestershire
- Region: South West
- Country: England
- Sovereign state: United Kingdom
- Post town: Dursley
- Postcode district: GL11
- Dialling code: 01453
- Police: Gloucestershire
- Fire: Gloucestershire
- Ambulance: South Western
- UK Parliament: Stroud

Owlpen is a small village and civil parish in the Stroud district of Gloucestershire, England, set in a valley in the Cotswold hills. It is about one mile (1.6 km) east of Uley, and three miles (4.8 km) east of Dursley. The Owlpen valley is set around the settlement like an amphitheatre of wooded hills open to the west. The landscape falls within the Cotswold Area of Outstanding Natural Beauty, so designated in 1966. The population of the parish in mid-2010 was 29 (est.), the smallest in Gloucestershire.

A key feature of the village is a Tudor manor house, Owlpen Manor, of the Mander family. The main economic activities in the village are agriculture, forestry and tourism.

== Name ==
Owlpen (pronounced locally "Ole-pen") derives its name, it is thought, from the Saxon thegn, Olla, who first set up his pen, or enclosure, by the springs that rise under the foundations of the manor, about the 9th century.

== Archaeology ==
There are several signs of early settlement in the area. Round barrows and standing stones are within a short walk of the manor house. Uley Bury, one mile (1.6 km) to the west, is a multi-vallate, scarp-edge hill-fort of the middle Iron Age (300 BC), commanding views over the Severn Vale and enclosing the Owlpen valley from the west. Hetty Pegler's Tump is a well-preserved middle Neolithic chambered long barrow of the Severn-Cotswold group (2900–2400 BC). The West Hill Romano-British temple site was excavated 1977–1979, revealing a shrine to the titular god Mercury. There are strip lynchets associated with the medieval agriculture of the demesne lands.

== History ==
There are records of the de Olepenne family (who may have named themselves after the place) settled at Owlpen by 1174. They were local landowners, benefactors to abbeys and hospitals, and henchmen to their feudal overlords, the Berkeleys of Berkeley Castle, whose wills and charters they regularly attest as their attorneys and witnesses.

In 1464, the male line failed after twelve generations of Olpennes, and the manor and lands passed to the Daunt family on the marriage of Margery de Olepenne to John Daunt of Wotton-under-Edge. The Daunts were clothiers who had been settled in Wotton since the 14th century. They later acquired land in Munster, Ireland, where by 1595 they had their principal estates at Gortigrenane Castle, near Carrigaline, and at Tracton Abbey, near Kinsale, both in County Cork. The main line failed on the death of Thomas Daunt VI in 1803, when the Stoughton family, Anglo-Irish landowners from County Kerry, inherited. They sold the estate in 1925–1926, after approximately 900 years of ownership in one family.

=== Owlpen Manor ===
Owlpen Manor is a Grade I listed manor house and the home of Sir Nicholas and Lady Karin Mander. The Tudor manor house and early 17th-century terraced gardens have been open to the public since 1966.

Listed buildings on the estate include the Grist Mill (1728) and Court House (c. 1620), today included among cottages available as holiday accommodation. A medieval cider barn (1446) is used as a restaurant and for weddings.

=== Owlpen House ===
The Stoughton family built a new mansion c. 1848, called Owlpen House, one mile (1.6 km) to the east of the original settlement, to the Italianate designs of Samuel Sanders Teulon. It was demolished in 1955–1956 for the value of its building materials, though outbuildings including the gas works, lodges and stable block remain.

=== Owlpen Church ===
The Church of the Holy Cross stands above the manor house. Of medieval origins (first recorded in 1262), the nave was rebuilt by the architect Samuel Manning (Senior) in 1828 and the chancel added with restoration by James Piers St Aubyn in 1876. The result includes a number of interior mosaics, with opus sectile tiles designed by Charles Hardgrave and made by James Powell and Sons of the Whitefriars Glassworks; encaustic floor tiles by William Godwin & Son of Lugwardine; and stained glass windows, by Powells and Heaton, Butler and Bayne. A baptistery with further mosaics and Cosmatesque pavement was added in 1912–1913, when the old Norman font was installed. It has been described as ‘the most elaborate Victorian-Edwardian interior in the Cotswolds’ (David Verey, Cotswold Churches). The church has been used as a filming location, including in 2008 for the BBC's four-part drama series, Tess of the d'Urbervilles.

The benefice was from medieval times a chapelry of the rectory of the nearby parish of Newington Bagpath, but has been united with Uley since the late 19th century, since when the united benefice has been referred to as "Uley-cum-Owlpen".
