= Harriet Crawford =

British archaeologist

- Born: 13 May 1937
- Died: 7 May 2026 (aged 88)

Academic background
- Education: University of Cambridge; UCL Institute of Archaeology

Academic work
- Discipline: Archaeology
- Institutions: UCL Institute of Archaeology

Harriet Elizabeth Walston Crawford, Lady Swinnerton-Dyer (1937-2026) was a British archaeologist. She was reader emerita at the UCL Institute of Archaeology and a senior fellow at the McDonald Institute for Archaeological Research, University of Cambridge.

== Life ==
Harriet Crawford Browne was born in 1937, the elder daughter of the judge Sir Patrick Browne and Evelyn Sophie Alexandra Walston.

In 1983 she married the mathematician Peter Swinnerton-Dyer.

== Career ==
Crawford studied at the University of Cambridge and the UCL Institute of Archaeology, where she completed her PhD in 1962. In 1971 she joined Lucy Cavendish College, Cambridge as Calouste Gulbenkian research fellow, and in the 1980s was librarian at the same college. In 1990, she was appointed to the Institute of Archaeology. She was director of the London Bahrain Archaeological Expedition (SAAR) alongside Jane Moon and Robert Killick from 1990 until 1995.

Crawford was chair of the British School of Archaeology in Iraq from 2000 until 2006.

Ruth Whitehouse, the Institute of Archaeology's first woman professor, has commented that Crawford "definitely should have been" made professor there. After Crawford's retirement, the UCL Institute of Archaeology gave her the title of reader emerita, and subsequently honorary visiting professor.

== Works ==
- The architecture of Iraq in the third millennium B.C.. Copenhagen: Akademisk Forlag, 1977
- (ed. 1979) Subterranean Britain: aspects of underground archaeology. New York: St. Martin's Press, 1979.
- Sumer and the Sumerians. Cambridge; New York: Cambridge University Press, 1991.
- (ed. with Robert Killick and Jane Moon) The Dilmun Temple at Saar : Bahrain and its archaeological inheritance. London; New York: Kegan Paul International, 1997.
- Dilmun and its Gulf neighbours. Cambridge; New York: Cambridge University Press, 1998.
- Regime change in the ancient Near East and Egypt : from Sargon of Agade to Saddam Hussein. Oxford; New York: Oxford University Press for the British Academy, 2007. Proceedings of the British Academy, 136.
- (ed. with Augusta McMahon) Preludes to urbanism : the late Chalcolithic of Mesopotamia. Cambridge: McDonald Institute for Archaeological Research, 2014. In honour of Joan Oates.
- The Sumerian World. London; New York: Routledge, 2013.
- Ur: city of the moon god. London: Bloomsbury Academic, 2015.
