= Francis Henry Blackburne Daniell =

Francis Henry Blackburne Daniell (19 January 1845 – 10 February 1921) was an Anglo-Irish barrister and historian, known for his work on the Calendar of State Papers.

== Early life and education ==
Francis Henry Blackburne Daniell was born at Roebuck, County Cavan, Ireland, son of Captain George Daniell (1797-1856), JP, of the Royal Navy, from an Irish landed gentry family, and Alicia Katherine (d. 1885), daughter of the judge and Lord Chancellor of Ireland Francis Blackburne. He was educated at St Columba's College, Dublin, and matriculated at Trinity College, Cambridge in 1863, graduating B.A. in 1867 and M.A. in 1870.

== Career ==
Blackburne Daniell entered the Inner Temple in 1866, and was a Fellow of Trinity College from 1869. He was called to the bar in 1871.

He worked as an editor on the Historical Manuscripts Commission and for the Calendar of State Papers, concentrating on the reign of Charles II of England. With Charles Thornton Forster he wrote Life and Letters of Ogier Ghiselin de Busbecq (London, 1881).

== Personal life ==
In 1877, he married Caroline Sophia (1844-1933), daughter of the barrister and agriculturist William Bence Jones, of Lisselane, County Cork, Ireland, and of 34, Elvaston Place, London. They had four sons- George (1878-1917), William Arthur (1881-1951), Francis (1882-1903), and Henry Edmund (1885-1970), who pursued military and civil service careers- and a daughter, Alice (1879-1925), who married Edward Granville Browne and was mother of the judge Sir Patrick Browne.

He died on 10 February 1921 in London.
