= F. L. Griggs =

English etcher, architectural draughtsman, illustrator and conservationist

Frederick Landseer Maur Griggs
- Born: 30 October 1876; Hitchin, Hertfordshire, England
- Died: 7 June 1938 (aged 61); Chipping Campden, Gloucestershire, England
- Education: Slade School of Art
- Known for: etcher, architectural draughtsman, illustrator
- Notable work: Owlpen Manor, The Almonry, Maur's Farm, Anglia Perdita
- Movement: British Etching Revival
- Awards: Royal Academician, Royal Society of Painter-Etchers and Engravers

Frederick Landseer Maur Griggs RA RE FSA (30 October 1876 – 7 June 1938) was an English etcher, architectural draughtsman, illustrator, and early conservationist, associated with the late flowering of the Arts and Crafts movement in the Cotswolds, centred in Chipping Campden. He was one of the first etchers to be elected to full membership of the Royal Academy, and was part of the final phase of the Etching Revival in Britain. He was elected the Master of the Art Workers' Guild in 1934.

Born in Hitchin, Hertfordshire, he worked as an illustrator for the Highways and Byways series of regional guides for the publishers, Macmillans. In 1903 he settled at Dover's House, in the market town of Chipping Campden in the Cotswolds, and went on to create one of the last significant Arts and Crafts houses at 'New Dover's House'. There he set up the Dover's House Press, where he printed late proofs of the etchings of Samuel Palmer, amongst others. He collaborated with Ernest Gimson and the Sapperton group of craftsmen in architectural and design work in the area.

== The etchings ==
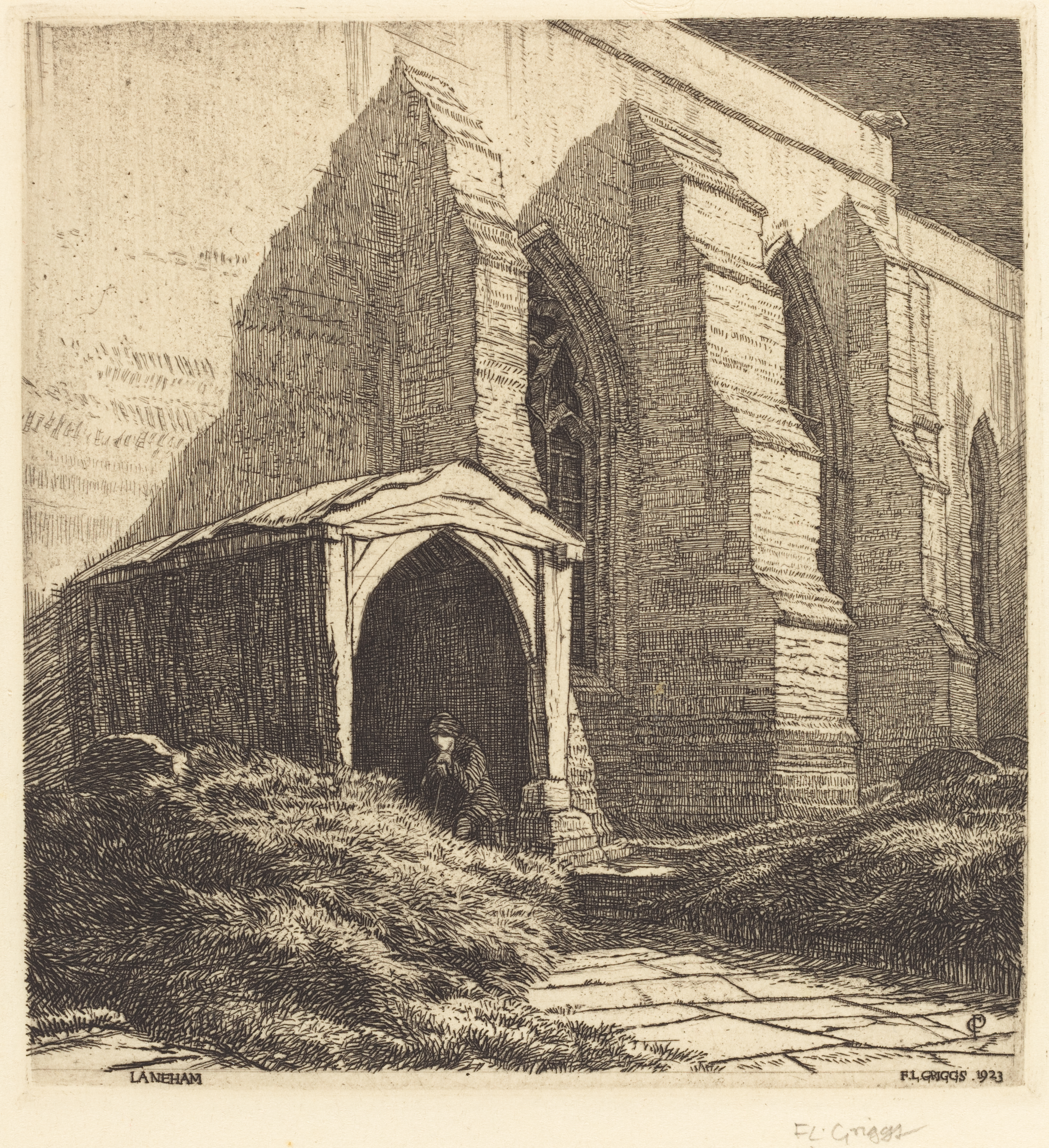
Etching by F.L. Griggs, "Laneham", 1923

'Fred' Griggs converted to Roman Catholicism in 1912 and set about producing a body of etchings, 57 meticulous plates in a Romantic tradition, evoking an idealised medieval England of pastoral landscapes and architectural fantasies of ruined abbeys and buildings.

His best-known etchings include 'Owlpen Manor' (1930), dedicated to his friend, the architect Norman Jewson, 'Anglia Perdita', 'Maur's Farm', 'St Botolph's, Boston', 'The Almonry', and 'Memory of Clavering'. Collections of his etched work are held in the Ashmolean Museum, the Fitzwilliam Museum, the Boston Public Library, and in major public collections worldwide.

== Legacy ==
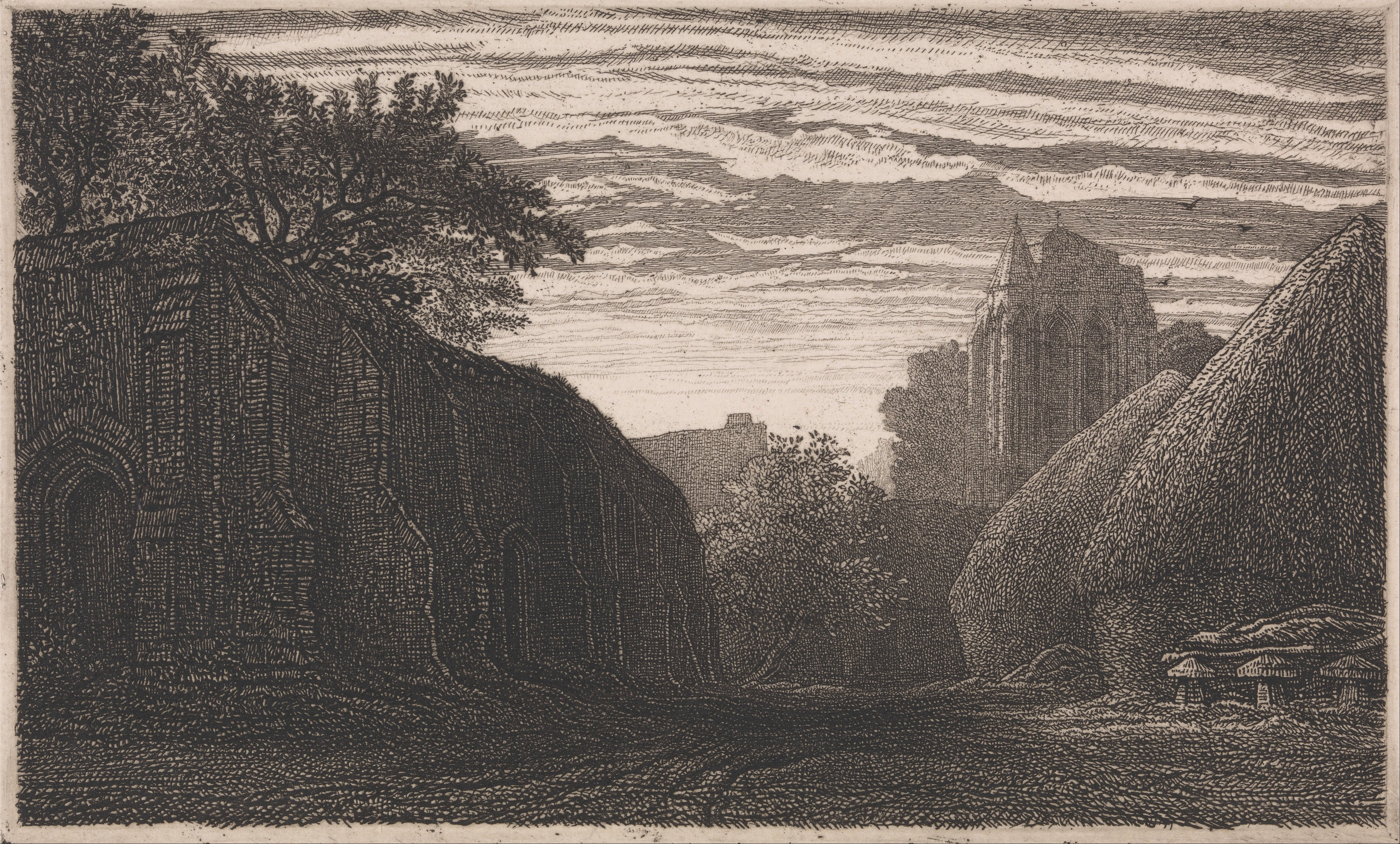
"Maur's Farm", 1913, "etching on medium, slightly textured, cream wove paper"

Griggs was one of the finest and most respected etchers of his time. He was an influential leader of the British etching revival in the Twenties and Thirties, and "the most important etcher who followed in the Samuel Palmer tradition" (K. M. Guichard, British Etchers, 1977). He occupies a pole position in the Romantic tradition of British art: he links the world of Blake, Turner and Samuel Palmer to a younger generation of neo-Romantic artists, including Graham Sutherland, John Piper, Robin Tanner and Joseph Webb.

== Bibliography ==
Books illustrated by Griggs (selected)

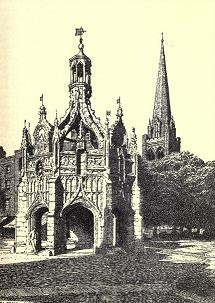
Chichester Cross (1904) from the book Highways and byways in Sussex

- Cook, E. T. Highways and byways in London (London: Macmillan, 1902).
- Lucas, E. V. Highways and byways in Sussex (London: Macmillan, 1904).
- Vincent, J. E. Highways and byways in Berkshire (London: Macmillan, 1906).
- Conybeare, Edward. Highways and byways in Cambridge and Ely (London: Macmillan, 1910).
- Rawnsley, W. F. Highways and byways in Lincolnshire (London: Macmillan, 1914).
- Firth, J. B. Highways and byways in Nottinghamshire (London: Macmillan, 1916).
- Evans, H. E. Highways and byways in Northamptonshire and Rutland (London: Macmillan, 1918).

Books/Articles about Griggs

- Alexander, Russell G. The engraved work of Frederick Landseer Griggs, etchings and drypoints, 1912-28 (Shakespeare Head Press, 1928)
- Clark, T. A. Silences of Noons: The Work of F.L. Griggs (1876–1938) (Cheltenham, 1988)
- Comstock, Francis Adams. A Gothic Vision: F.L. Griggs and his Work (Oxford and Boston, 1966, 1978 reprinted)
- Dodgson, Campbell. The Etchings of F. L. Griggs The Print Collector’s Quarterly 1924 Feb Vol 11, No. 1, p95.
- Dodgson, Campbell. The Etchings of F. L. Griggs (Catalogue) The Print Collector’s Quarterly 1924 Feb Vol 11, No. 1, p123
- Dodgson, Campbell. The Later Etched Work of F. L. Griggs R. A. The Print Collector’s Quarterly 1933 Oct Vol 20, No. 4, p321
- Dodgson, Campbell. The Latest Etchings of F. L. Griggs R. A. The Print Collector’s Quarterly 1939 Oct Vol 26, No. 3, p265
- Dodgson, Campbell. Catalogue (Supplement) of the Etchings of F. L. Griggs By Russell Alexander, 1928 The Print Collector’s Quarterly 1939 Oct Vol 26, No. 3, p275
- Moore, Jerrold Northrop. F. L. Griggs: The Architecture of Dreams (OUP, 1999; Antique Collector's Club 2008)
- Moore, Jerrold Northrop. The Green Fuse: Pastoral Vision in English Art 1820-2000 (2007)
- Wright, Harold J. L. The Etched Work of F. L. Griggs with a Catalogue by Campbell Dodgson (Print Collectors' Club, 1941)
