= James Douglas Pearson =

- Born: James Douglas Pearson; December 1911; Cambridge, Great Britain
- Died: 1 August 1997 (aged 85); Cambridge, Great Britain
- Occupations: Librarian; Bibliographer
- Years active: 1927–1997

James Douglas Pearson (December 1911 – August 1, 1997) was a British librarian and bibliographer in the field of Islamic studies who founded the Index Islamicus.

== Life ==
James Pearson grew up in Cambridge, where he was also educated. His first job was as a book fetcher in the Cambridge University Library at the age of 16.

He grew an interest in exotic languages and was awarded a scholarship for Hebrew at St John's College. He graduated in 1936 and studied other languages such as Arabic and Persian. He was then enlisted in the Oriental Section of the Library until 1941. He was then enlisted for war service until 1945. He worked again in the same library as an assistant under-librarian from 1945 until 1950. During 1950, he was appointed as librarian of the School of Oriental and African Studies in London. Until 1972, the SOAS library expanded and developed.

In 1972, Pearson was appointed as senior fellow and professor of bibliography in the University of London. He retired from this title during 1979 and returned to Cambridge, while working on the Index Islamicus. In 1982, he retired from editorship, and handed responsibility of the Index Islamicus to Cambridge University.

During 1967, Pearson established the Middle East Libraries Committee. It is now known as MELCOM UK. This gave birth to a large series of bibliographies and research tools. Professor James Pearson was involved in the beginning of a European dimension to this activity in 1979, resulting in the formation of MELCOM International.

== Death ==
At the time of his death, Pearson was still working on a further volume on the Middle East. Pearson died of a stroke he had a week before his death on 1 August 1997.

== Index Islamicus ==
In addition to maintaining the usual catalogue of books, Pearson decided it would be helpful to create a catalogue of the articles that were in the Library's periodicals and other collective volumes. James Pearson made reasons that this material would be of major importance to many researchers. If left uncatalogued, the literature would be overlooked, and work would most likely be duplicated.

With massive teams of helpers at SOAS, he created a catalogue of 25000 articles in the field of Islamic studies. All of these articles were published within the years from 1906 to 1955. The contents of other libraries other than SOAS were added to the bibliography.

To improve the bibliography, it had to be arranged in a classified form and to be published. This caused the creation of the first Index Islamicus, which was published in 1958.
