= Stouts Hill =

Country house in Uley, Gloucestershire, England

Coordinates: 51.6783°N 2.3092°W

Stouts Hill is in Gloucestershire, England
Stouts Hill (England)
Stouts Hill (the United Kingdom)
Stouts Hill (Europe)

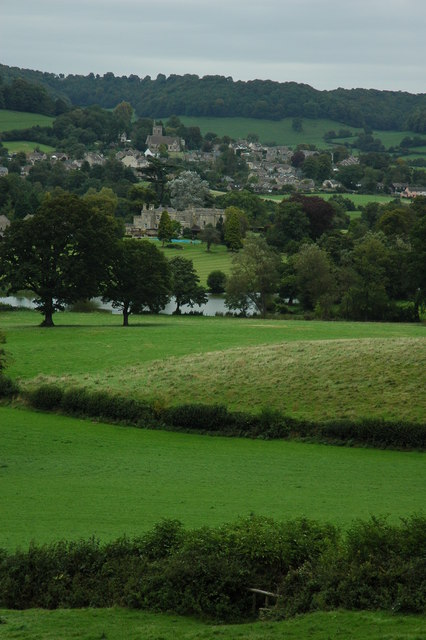
Stouts Hill is a holiday centre which is situated in the valley near the village of Uley. Here it is viewed from the south-west with Uley in the background.

Stouts Hill is an 18th-Century Gothic Revival country house situated in the Cotswolds, just outside the village of Uley.

Although there are records of one Adam le Stut settled here in the 13th century, the present house, built for the Gyde family of local weavers, dates only from 1743, the design being attributed to William Halfpenny. In the late 18th century, the estate was acquired by the Lloyd Baker family, whose principal estate was established at Hardwicke Court, near Gloucester. It was subsequently occupied as a secondary house by members of the family, including Colonel Chapman Browne, one of whose sons was Sir Benjamin Chapman Browne (mayor of Newcastle, 1885–1886, chairman of R. & W. Hawthorn, Leslie and Company, 1886-1916 and deputy Lord Lieutenant of Northumberland 1901).

Stouts Hill was the birthplace of the distinguished Persian scholar Edward Granville Browne, the oldest son of Sir Benjamin Chapman Browne and grandson of Colonel Chapman Browne. It was also, reputedly, the birthplace of the Gloucestershire historian Samuel Rudder.

From 1935 until 1979 it was let for use as a private boys' preparatory school in which some 100 pupils were boarders. Notable former pupils of the school include Stephen Fry, who makes a detailed reference to the school in his 1997 autobiography, Moab Is My Washpot, and Captain Mark Phillips, former husband of Anne, the Princess Royal.
