= Edward Denison Ross =

British Orientalist and linguist (1871–1940)

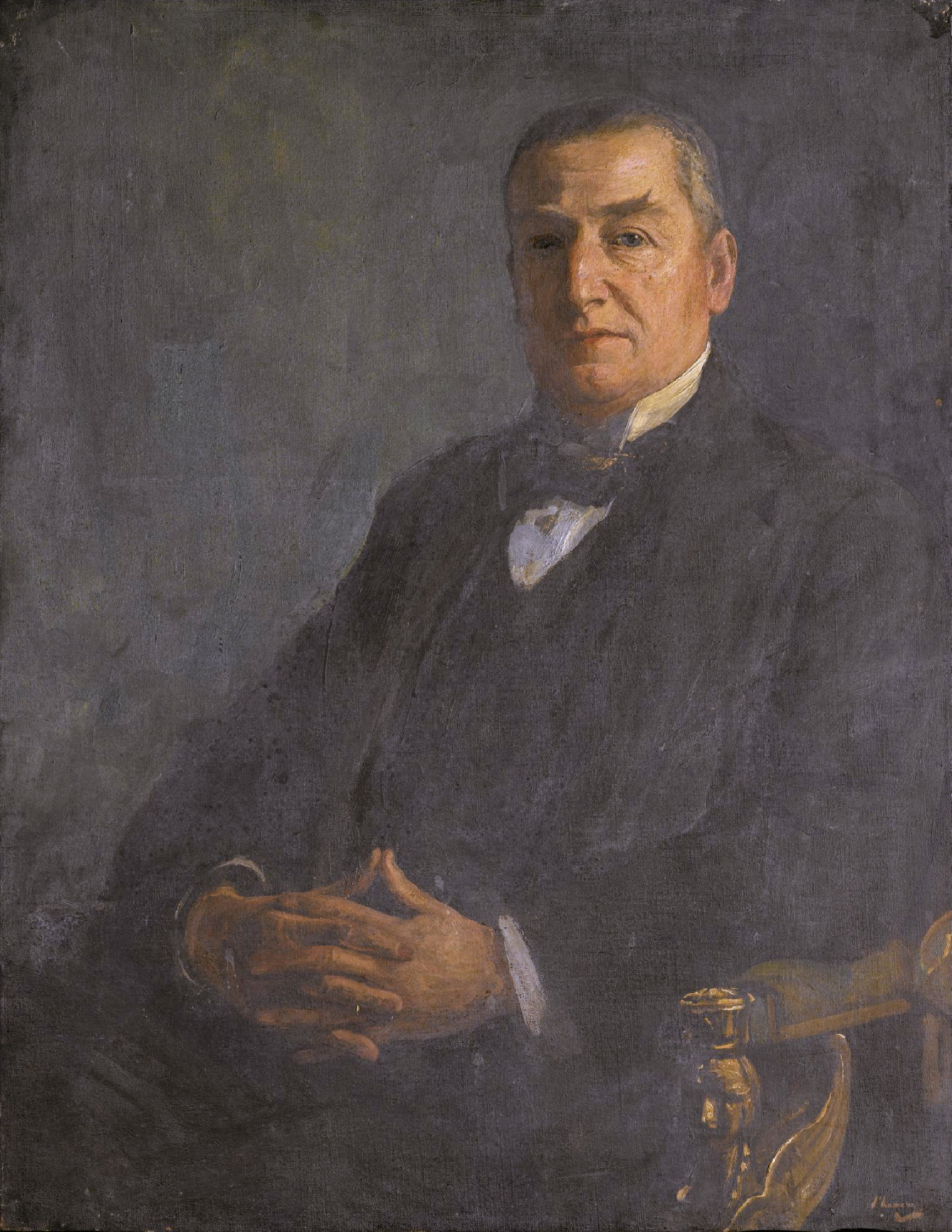
Edward Denison Ross (John Lavery, 1922)

Sir Edward Denison Ross (6 June 1871 – 20 September 1940), known as Denison, was a British orientalist and linguist, specializing in languages of the Middle East, Central and East Asia. He was the first director of the University of London's School of Oriental Studies (now SOAS, University of London) from 1916 to 1937.

Ross read in 49 languages and spoke in 30. He was the director of the British Information Bureau for the Near East. Ross wrote an Introduction to a reprint of George Sale's translation of the Quran. Along with Eileen Power, he wrote and edited a 26-volume series published by George Routledge & Sons, The Broadway Travellers. The series included the diary of the 17th-century naval chaplain Henry Teonge. Ross joined the staff of the British Museum in 1914, appointed to catalogue the collections of Sir Aurel Stein. He was an original trustee of the E. J. W. Gibb Memorial Series. In 1934, Edward Denison Ross attended Ferdowsi Millenary Celebration in Tehran.

In January 1940, shortly after the outbreak of World War II in Europe, Ross was named head of the British Information Bureau at Istanbul with the rank of Counsellor. As an acquaintance of the deceased Turkish leader, Mustafa Kemal Atatürk, Ross was eager to serve his country from Turkey. However, the loss of his wife Dora in April 1940 was more than he could bear, and Sir Denison himself died in Istanbul at age 69 in September 1940. He is buried at the Haydarpasha English Cemetery in Uskudar.

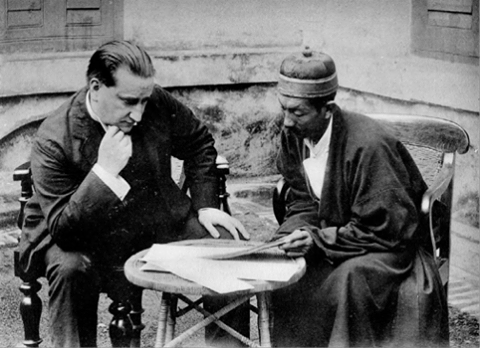
Sir Edward Denison Ross learning Tibetan with Lama Lobqang (probably Darjeeling, 1907)

== Bibliography ==
Some of these he was the sole author; some he was the translator; some he was a joint author:

- 1893 - A year amongst the Persians
- 1895 - History Of The Moghuls Of Central Asia; Tarikh-i-rashidi Of Mirza Muhammad ...
- 1895 - The Tarikh-i-Rashidi of Mirza Muhammad Haidar, Dughlat: a history of the Mo...
- 1895 - The Tarikh-i-rashidi; a history of the Moghuls of central Asia; an English version. Muhammad Haidar, Dughlat, d. 1551
- 1899 - The heart of Asia: a history of Russian Turkestan and the Central Asian khan... Skrine, Francis Henry, 1847–1933
- 1900 - Modern Persian Literature
- 1900 - The Ruba'iyat of Omar Khayyam
- 1901 - Babism
- 1902 - Catalogue of two collections of Persian and Arabic manuscripts preserved in t...
- 1904 - The booke of freendeship of Marcus Tullie Cicero
- 1905 - Catalogue of the Arabic and Persian manuscripts in the library of the Calcutta University
- 1908 - Catalogue of the Arabic and Persian manuscripts in the Oriental public library ...
- 1910 - An Arabic history of Gujarat; Zafar ul-walih bi Muzaffar wa alih; by 'Abdallah Muhammad ibn "Ulnar, al-Asaf UlughkhanT, 'Abd Allah Muhammad ibn 'Urnar, appr…
- 1910 - Marharnu l-'ilali 'l-mu'dila Yafi'T, 'Abd Allah ibn As'ad, –1367
- 1910 - The Persian and Turki divans.
- 1912 - Great religions of the world Giles, Herbert Allen, 1845–1935 1912
- 1916 - Stories From Sadis Bustan And Gulistan
- 1916 - The Panjab North-west Frontier Province And Kashmir
- 1918 - Catalogue Of The Arabic And Persian Manuscripts Vol VI
- 1920 - Report of the Calcutta University Commission 1
- 1921 - An Arabic History Of Gujarat Vol LI
- 1922 - The Journal Of The Royal Asiatic Society Of Great Britain Ireland
- 1925 - Hong Kong Daily Press, 19 March 1925
- 1927 - A year amongst the Persians. Impressions as to the life, character, & thought...
- 1928 - An index to the Arabic history of Gujarat. Zafar ul-walih bi Muzaffar wa alih
- 1928 - Gertrude Bell's Persian pictures
- 1928 - Hue and Gabet: travels in Tartary, Tibet and China, 1844–1846
- 1928 - Islam
- 1928 - Persian Pictures
- 1928 - THE BROADWAY TRAVELLERS
- 1928 - Turkestan Down To The Mongol In Asion
- 1929 - Islam: beliefs and institutions
- 1930 - Jahangir and the Jesuits
- 1930 - Jahangir And The Jesuits
- 1930 - Jahangir And The Jesuits With An Account Of The Travels Of Benedictr Goes
- 1930 - Jewish Travels
- 1930 - Persian Art
- 1930 - The Orkhon Inscriptions: Being a Translation of Professor Vilhelm Thomsen's ..
- 1931 - Persians
- 1931 - The Broadway Travellers
- 1936 - The Central Structure Of The Mughal Empire
- 1938 - Humayun Badshah
- 1939 - THIS ENGLISH LANGUAGE
- 1950 - The travels of Marco Polo
- 1972 - History of the Moghuls of Central Asia, Being the Tarikh-I-Rashidi
- 1986 - Dangerous Heart
- 2018 - Three Turki manuscripts from Kashghar
- Undated - Early Turkish Inscriptions
- Undated - The Early Years Of Shah Ismail The Founder Of The Safavi Dynasty
- Undated - The first Englishmen in India: letters and narratives of sundry Elizabethans
- Undated - The Tarikh-i-rashidi – Murad Butt.

Academic offices
New title	Director of School of Oriental Studies; 1916–1937	Succeeded by Sir Ralph Lilley Turner
