= Benjamin Chapman Browne =

Engineer and Shipbuilder (1839–1917)

Sir Benjamin Chapman Browne
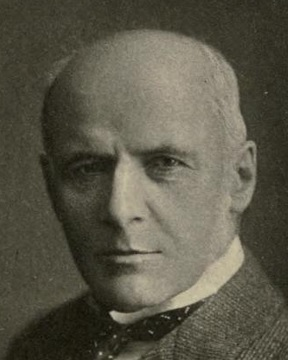
- Benjamin Chapman Brown (1839 - 1917)
- Born: 26 August 1839; Stouts Hill, Gloucestershire, UKGBI
- Died: 1 March 1917 (aged 77); Westacres estate, Benwell, Newcastle upon Tyne, UKGBI
- Education: King's College, London
- Occupations: Engineer; shipbuilder
- Spouse: Annie Browne (m. 1861)
- Children: 9, including: Edward Granville Browne
- Honours: DCL (Hon.)

Sir Benjamin Chapman Browne (26 August 1839 – 1 March 1917) was an engineer and shipbuilder, who served as the chairman of R. & W. Hawthorn, Leslie and Company between 1886 and 1916. The Major of Newcastle upon Tyne during 1885 to 1887, Browne also served as the deputy Lord Lieutenant of Northumberland in 1901.

== Early life ==
Browne was born on 26 August 1839 at Stouts Hill in Gloucestershire to Colonel Benjamin Chapman Browne and Mary Anne Lloyd Browne (née Baker).

Educated at Westminster School from 1852 to 1855, Browne studied applied science for a year at King's College London. In 1856, Browne began a mechanical engineering apprenticeship under William Armstrong at the Elswick Ordnance Company.

== Career ==
In 1870, he was part of a consortium of four people who purchased the works of Messrs. R. & W. Hawthorn on the Tyne. Browne had wanted the business to manufacture only marine engines but orders were buoyant for locomotives. In 1886, the business was amalgamated with the shipbuilders Andrew Leslie and Company. The combined business became R. & W. Hawthorn, Leslie and Company, Browne was elected chairman and the firm's activities then included the building of torpedo boats and destroyers.

Browne was elected to Newcastle town council in 1879, served as mayor of Newcastle from 1885 to 1887 and was knighted in the 1887 Golden Jubilee Honours. Also in 1887, he was awarded an Honorary DCL by the University of Durham in recognition of the role he played in founding the College of Physical Science, which was later to become Armstrong College, in Newcastle. He was also a Member of the Institution of Civil Engineers, and a Member of the Institution of Naval Architects. He authored a number of publications and several of these are brought together in the compilation Selected Papers on Social and Economic Questions published by Cambridge University Press in 1918.

== Personal life ==
On 9 February 1861, Browne married Annie Browne (née Atkinson), the daughter of the Newcastle mining engineer Robert Thomas Atkinson (1807–1845), and the great-niece of the mining engineer John Buddle. The couple had nine children, two of whom died in childhood. Their eldest son Edward Granville Browne was an Iranologist and Sir Thomas Adams's Professor of Arabic.

In 1887, Browne moved to the Westacres estate in Benwell, Newcastle upon Tyne. Browne was a devout member of the Church of England and was a disciple of the Oxford Movement. On 1 March 1917, Browne died at Westacres estate aged 77.
