= Edward Granville Browne =

British Iranologist (1862–1926)

Edward Granville Browne FBA FRCP
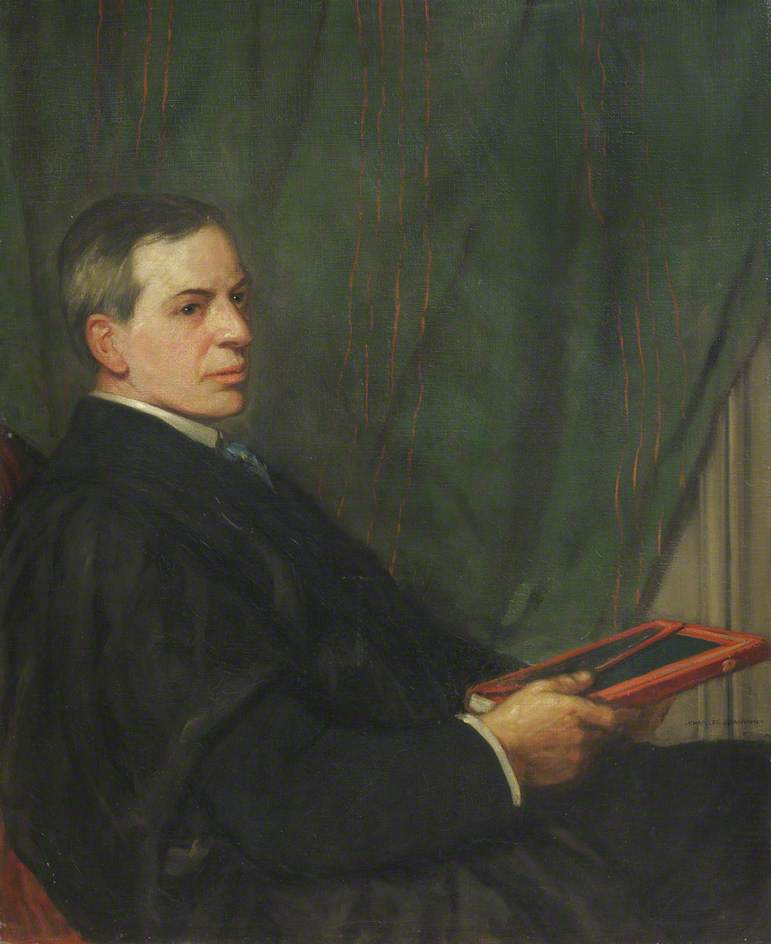
- Portrait of Browne by Charles Haslewood Shannon, c. 1912
- Born: 7 February 1862; Stouts Hill, Gloucestershire, UKGBI
- Died: 5 January 1926 (aged 63); Cambridge, Cambridgeshire, UK
- Resting place: Elswick Cemetery
- Spouse: Alice Caroline Browne (m. 1906; died 1925)
- Children: 2, including Patrick Browne
- Father: Benjamin Chapman Browne
- Relatives: Francis Henry Blackburne Daniell (father-in-law)

Academic background
- Education: Pembroke College, Cambridge, BA, 1882; University of Cambridge, MA, 1884; St Bartholomew's Hospital, 1887, MB

Edward Granville Browne FBA FRCP (7 February 1862 – 5 January 1926) was a British Iranologist and Sir Thomas Adams's Professor of Arabic at the University of Cambridge.

== Early life and education ==
Browne was born on 7 February 1862 at Stouts Hill in Gloucestershire to Benjamin Chapman Browne, an engineer and shipbuilder, and Annie Browne (née Atkinson). The eldest son of nine siblings, Browne's father initially wished for him to pursue a career in engineering. Educated at Trinity College, Glenalmond, Burnside's, and Eton College, Browne attended Newcastle College of Physical Science from 1877 to 1879. Following the outbreak of the Russo-Turkish War in 1877, Browne's sympathies towards the Ottomans led him to study Turkish.

Agreeing with his father to study Natural Sciences Tripos with the potential view of a career in medicine, Browne enrolled at Pembroke College, Cambridge. Whilst at Cambridge, Browne studied Arabic under Edward Henry Palmer and William Wright Persian under Edward Byles Cowell, and Turkish under James Redhouse. After graduating with a BA in 1882, Browne travelled to Constantinople where deepened his knowledge of Sufism and Ottoman and Persian classical poetry.

Returning to the University of Cambridge, Browne studied for an Indian languages tripos Master's (comprising Hindustani, Sanskrit, Persian, and Arabic) from 1882 to 1884. Resuming his medical studies at St Bartholomew's Hospital, Browne graduated with a Bachelor of Medicine in 1887.

== Career ==
Made a Fellow of Pembroke College in 1887, Browne visited Qajar Iran (present-day Iran) from October 1887 to September 1888. Visiting Tabriz, Tehran, Isfahan, Shiraz, Yazd, and Kerman, Browne actively avoided his fellow Europeans whilst visiting the country. In 1888, whilst still travelling, Browne was appointed a university lecturer in Persian at University of Cambridge.

In April 1902, Browne was elected the Sir Thomas Adams's Professor of Arabic at the University of Cambridge. Browne was mainly responsible for the creation at Cambridge of a school of living languages of Asia, in connection with the training of candidates for the Egyptian and Sudanese civil services, and the Lebanese consular service. He was on his sixtieth birthday the recipient of a large Festschrift. . Browne was one of the original trustees of the E. J. W. Gibb Memorial, an organisation which since 1905 has published the Gibb Memorial Series.

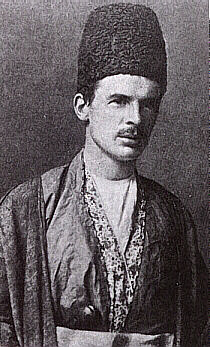
Edward Granville Browne wearing Iranian garments

=== Persian Title of Mazhar-e Ali ===
In London (1885), Browne met Haji Pirzadeh Naeini, a famous intellectual-mystic and world traveler of the Qajar era, through whom he broadened his interest and knowledge of Persian history, culture, and language. Naeini gave Browne a set of Soufi garb, and received the title of "Mazhar-e Ali" "Manifestation of Ali." Browne wore the garb in his meetings with Persians and used the title in signing all his Persian correspondence and writings.

In return, Browne called Pirzadeh "the guide of the path" and "the repository of the secrets of truth" and "the sage seeker of the path". This relationship led Browne not only to broaden his knowledge and interest in Persia (Iran) but also to ask the British Foreign Office to be assigned consul at the British Embassy to Tehran, which eventually resulted in his publishing A Year Amongst The Persians in 1893.

=== Works ===
Letter by Browne to Snouck Hurgronje (1921)

Browne published in areas which few other Western scholars had explored. Many of his publications are related to Iran, either in the fields of history or Persian literature. He is perhaps best known for his documentation and historical narratives of Bábism as relayed by Arthur de Gobineau. He published two translations of Bábí histories, and wrote several of the few Western accounts of early Bábí and Baháʼí history.

Browne was not a Baháʼí, but rather an Orientalist. His interest in the Bábí movement was piqued by a book by de Gobineau found while he was looking for materials on tasawwuf. The history A Traveller's Narrative was written by `Abdu'l-Bahá and translated by Browne, who added a large introduction and appendices. Browne was fascinated by the development of the written historical perspectives of the Baháʼís regarding successorship after the Báb including their idea of an independent dispensation of Bahá'u'lláh. These Baháʼí-authored works emphasized Bahá'u'lláh to a greater extent than the Báb and took a critical view against Subh-i-Azal, whom Arthur de Gobineau listed as the Báb's successor. Browne expressed sympathy for Subh-i-Azal and surprise at the route the religion had taken.

About the Baháʼí teachings he says:

These teachings are in themselves admirable, though inferior, in my opinion, both in beauty and simplicity to the teachings of Christ.

— Materials for the Study of the Babi Religion, Introduction, p. xxi.

Browne was granted four successive interviews with Bahá'u'lláh during the five days he was a guest at Bahjí (April 15–20, 1890).

In A Year Amongst the Persians (1893) he wrote a sympathetic portrayal of Persian society. After his death in 1926 it was reprinted and became a classic in English travel literature. He also published the first volume of A Literary History of Persia in 1902 with subsequent volumes in 1906, 1920, and 1924. It remains a standard authority.

Amongst Iranians, Browne is still well remembered today. A street named after him in Tehran, as well as a statue depicting him, remained in place even after the Iranian Revolution in 1979.

== Personal life ==
On 20 June 1906, Browne married Alice Caroline Browne (née Blackburne Daniell), the daughter of the barrister Francis Henry Blackburne Daniell, in London. The couple had two sons, including the judge Patrick Browne.

In November 1924, Browne suffered a severe heart attack after which he ceased working. On 5 January 1926, Browne died at his home in Cambridge, 7 months after the death of his wife. Browne was buried at Elswick Cemetery in Newcastle on 8 January.

== Bibliography ==
- Religious Systems of the World: A Contribution to the Study of Comparative Religion (1889)
- A Traveller's Narrative: Written to illustrate the episode of the Bab (Cambridge: University Press, 1891)
- A Year Among the Persians (1893)
- A chapter from the history of Cannabis Indica (1897)
- A Literary History of Persia (London: T. Fisher Unwin, 1902); reprinted (Cambridge: University Press, 1928).
- The Persian Revolution of 1905–1909 (Cambridge: University Press, 1910)
- Materials for the Study of the Babi Religion (Cambridge: University Press, 1918)
- Arabian Medicine(1921)
