= Edward J. Burrow =

- Born: June 8, 1869; Wellington, Somerset
- Died: September 19, 1934 (aged 65); Cheltenham
- Occupation: Engraver

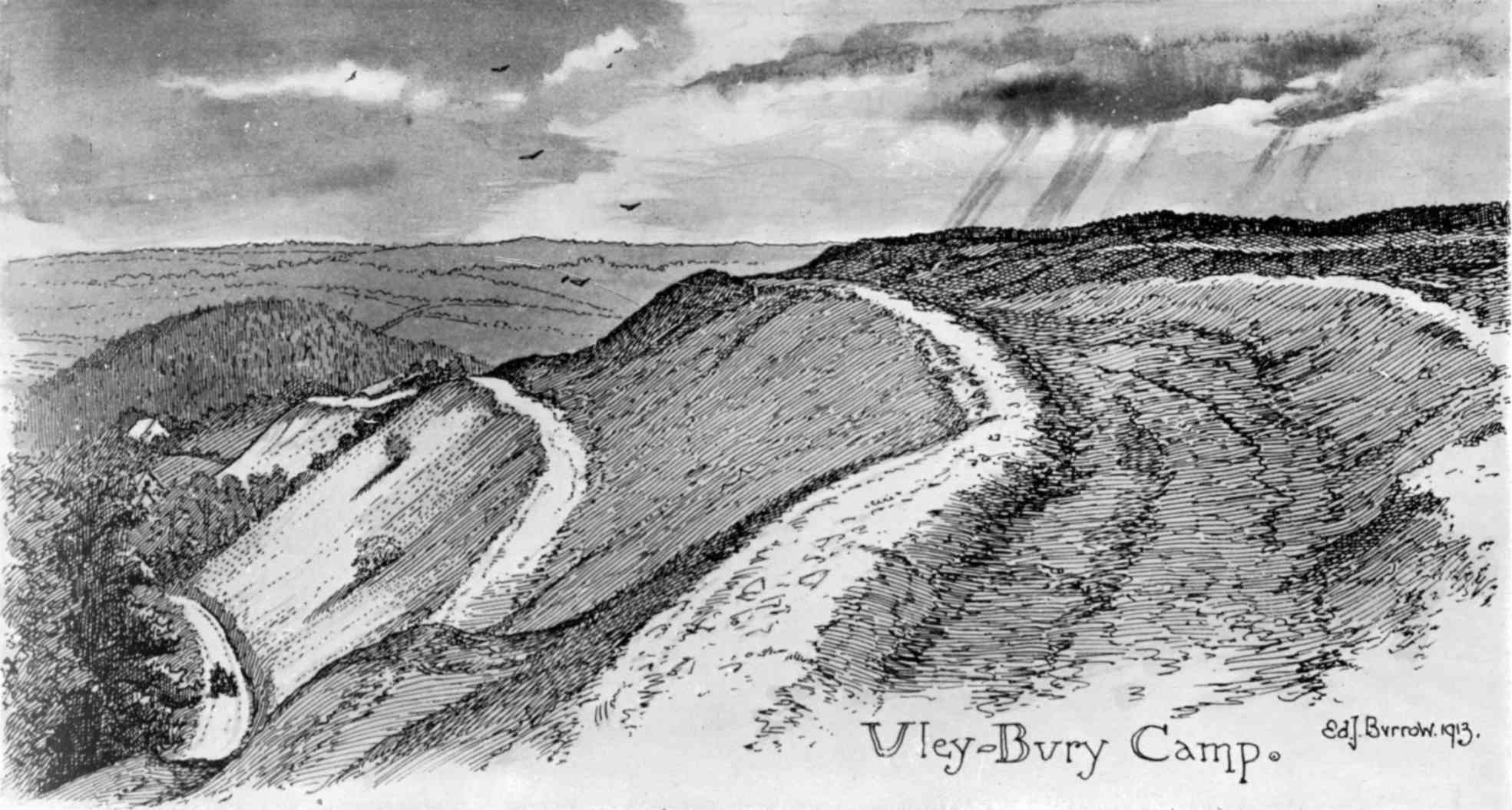
Uley Bury, an illustration by Burrow from"The Ancient Entrenchments and Camps of Gloucestershire published in 1919

Edward J. Burrow (8 June 1869, Wellington, Somerset – 19 September 1934, Cheltenham) was a prodigious engraver and founder of Edward J. Burrow and Co., a printing and publishing firm.

Beginning in the years before the First World War Burrow published more than 500 travel guides in a series titled The "Borough" Pocket Guides (also known as The "Borough" Guides) to various localities of the British Isles and some parts of the Continent. In the 1920s he published a book series titled Burrow's "RAC" Guides, which were issued under the auspices of the Royal Automobile Club Touring Department. In the 1930s he issued another series named Burrow's Grey Guides.

Until the 1960s Burrow was the most prolific publishers of local authority official guidebooks in the UK, from booklets covering small rural districts to large civic handbooks for London metropolitan boroughs.
