= Elias John Wilkinson Gibb =

Scottish orientalist (1857–1901)

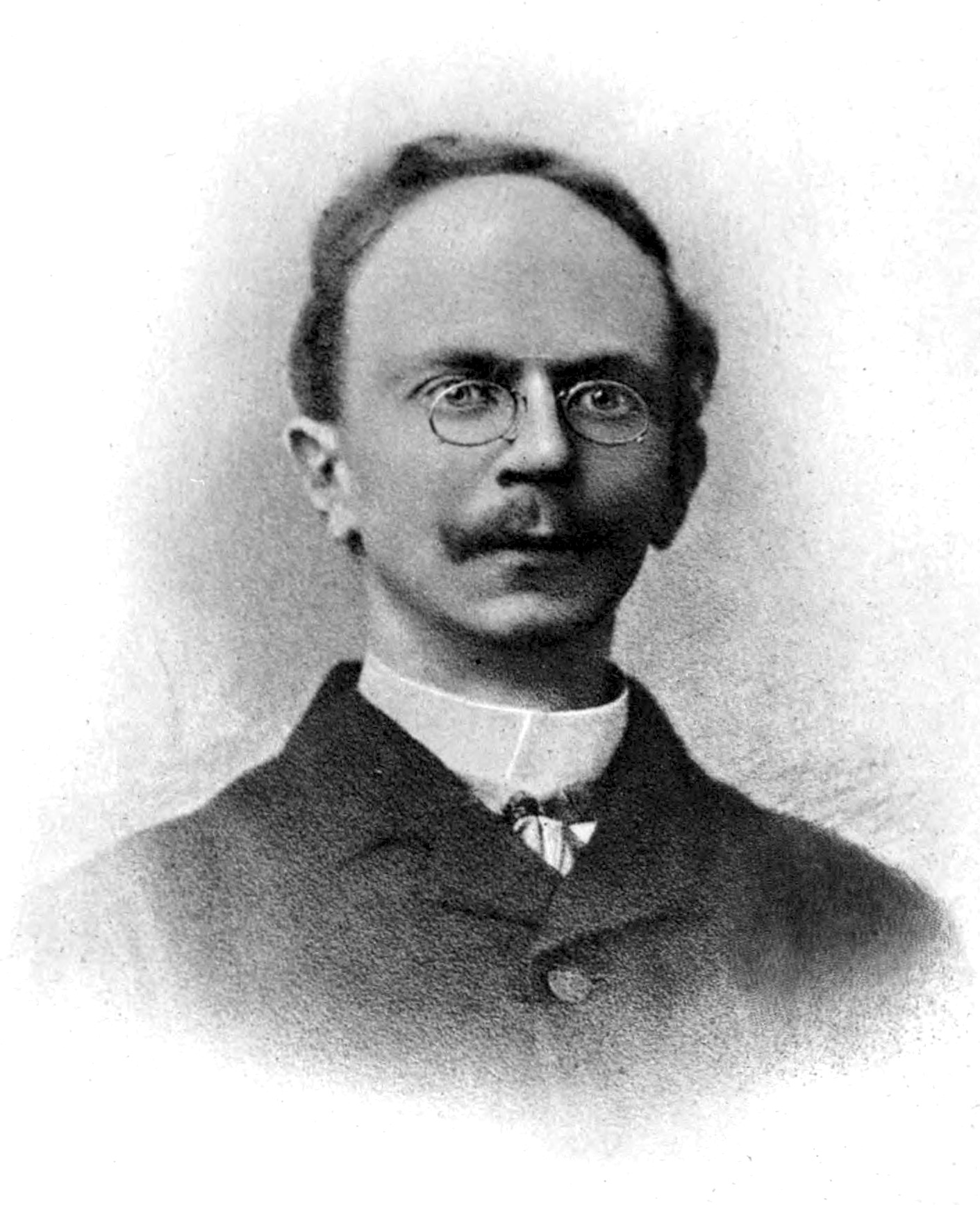
Photograph of Gibb taken about 1896–1899

Elias John Wilkinson Gibb (3 June 1857 - 5 December 1901) was a Scottish orientalist.

Gibb was born 3 June 1857 in Glasgow, at 25 Newton Place, to Elias John Gibb and Jane Gilman. He was educated by Collier and matriculated from Glasgow University in 1873. Gibb acquired a knowledge of Arabic and Persian languages, and became especially interested in Turkish language and literature. Gibb married and moved to London in 1899. He made a few visits to Europe, but never visited the regions that he studied. He did, however, come to be viewed as a sympathetic and talented orientalist, with an excellent library, and was acquainted with Muslim poets and scholars. His series of volumes on Ottoman poetry is especially noteworthy.

He died 5 December 1901, aged 44 at his residence in London from scarlet fever, and was buried at Kensal Green Cemetery. His library was acquired by Cambridge University, the British Museum, and the British embassy at Constantinople. His name is commemorated in the long running "Gibb Memorial Series" of publications, primarily devoted to the translation of Turkish, Persian, and Arabic texts, funded by the trust established by Jane Gibb (d. 1904), the author's mother.

== Works ==
- The History of the Forty Vezirs or the story of the forty morns and eves (Contes turcs [Qyrq wezīr ḥikājesi). Written in Turkish by Sheykh-Zāda [Šaiḫzāda]. Done into English by E(lias) J(ohn) W(ilkinson) Gibb / Šaiḫzāda. London 1886
- Ottoman poems. Translated into English in The original forms. With introduction, biographical notices, and notes. London, Glasgow 1882
- A history of Ottoman poetry. 6 Bde. London 1900-1909 (Nachdruck London 1958-67, Vol. 2-6 edited by Edward Granville Browne
- Ottoman Literature; The Poets and Poetry of Turkey, Translated from the Arabic with Introduction and Biographical Notes by E. J. W. Gibb, with Arabian, Persian, and Hebrew Poems, and a Special Introduction by Theodore P. Ion, New York 1901
