= Uley Bury =

Hill fort in Gloucestershire, England

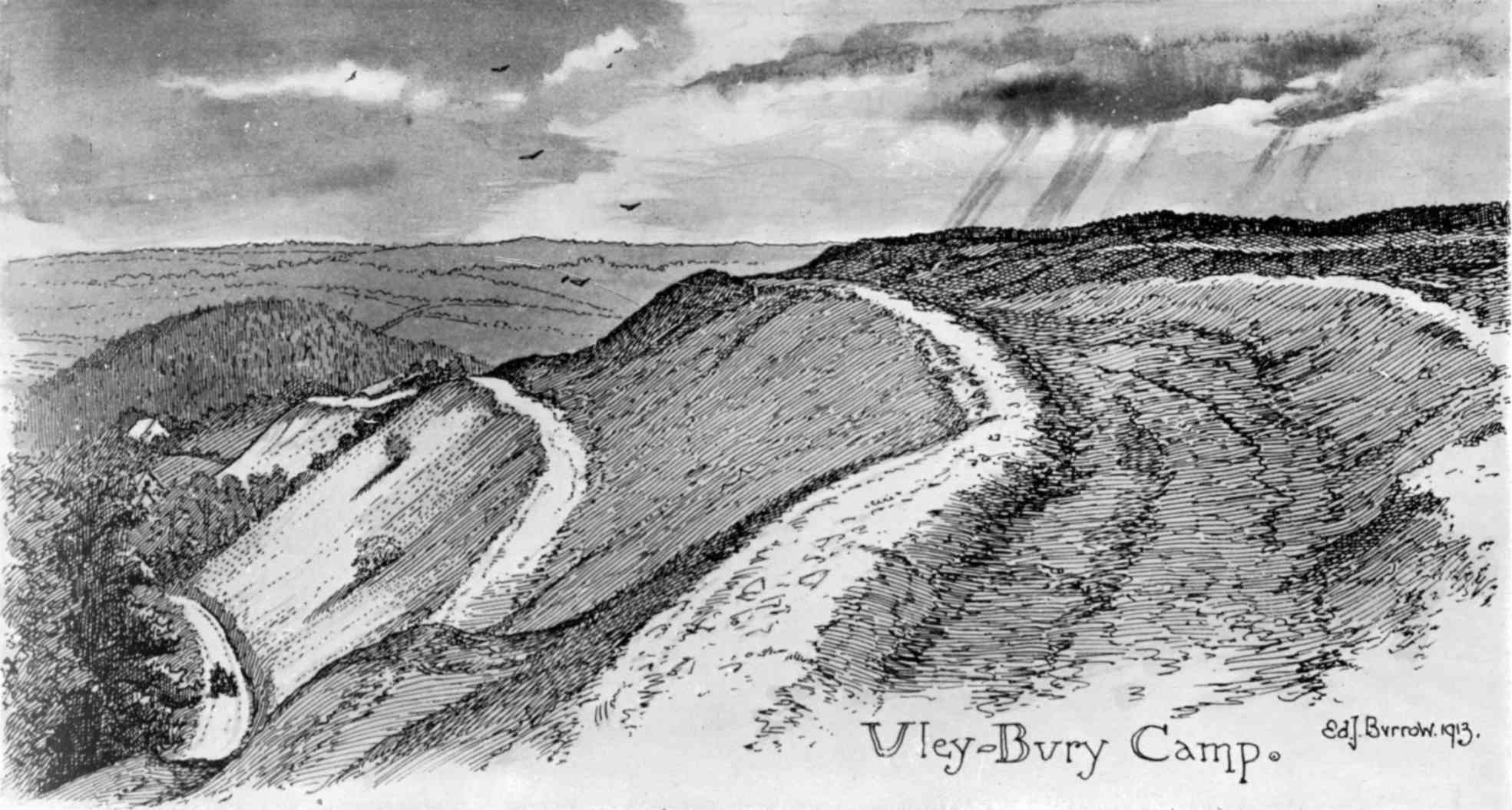
View along the north-eastern rampart of Uley Bury, drawn by Edward J. Burrow in 1913

Uley Bury is the long, flat-topped hill just outside Uley, Gloucestershire, England. It is an impressive multi-vallate, scarp-edge Iron Age hill fort dating from around 300 B.C. Standing some 750 feet (230 metres) above sea level it has views over the Severn Vale.

== Location ==
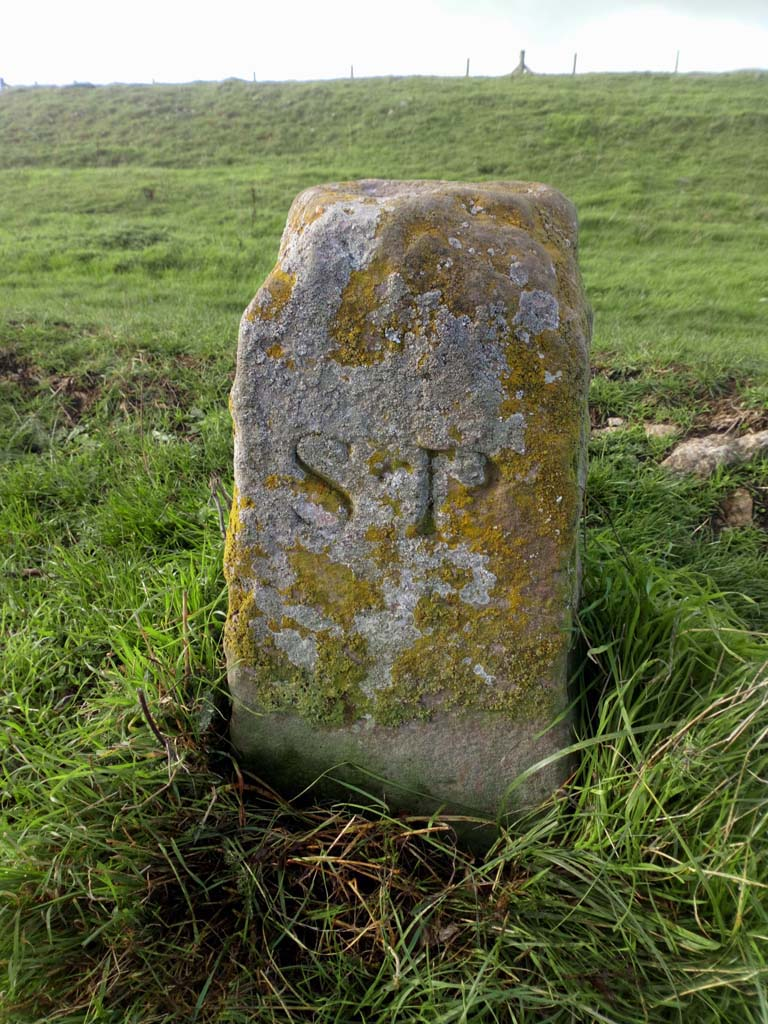
farmer's Boundary Stone, Southern escarpment. 51.68601,-2.31515 / 51°41'9.64"N+2°18'54.53"W

Uley Bury is located at grid reference ST787992; (51°41.3′N 2°18.7′W).

The main access is from the Dursley to Stroud road (B4066) at Crawley Hill, just north of Uley. It can also be accessed from the Cotswold Way, and from several other local footpaths and bridleways.

== Geology ==
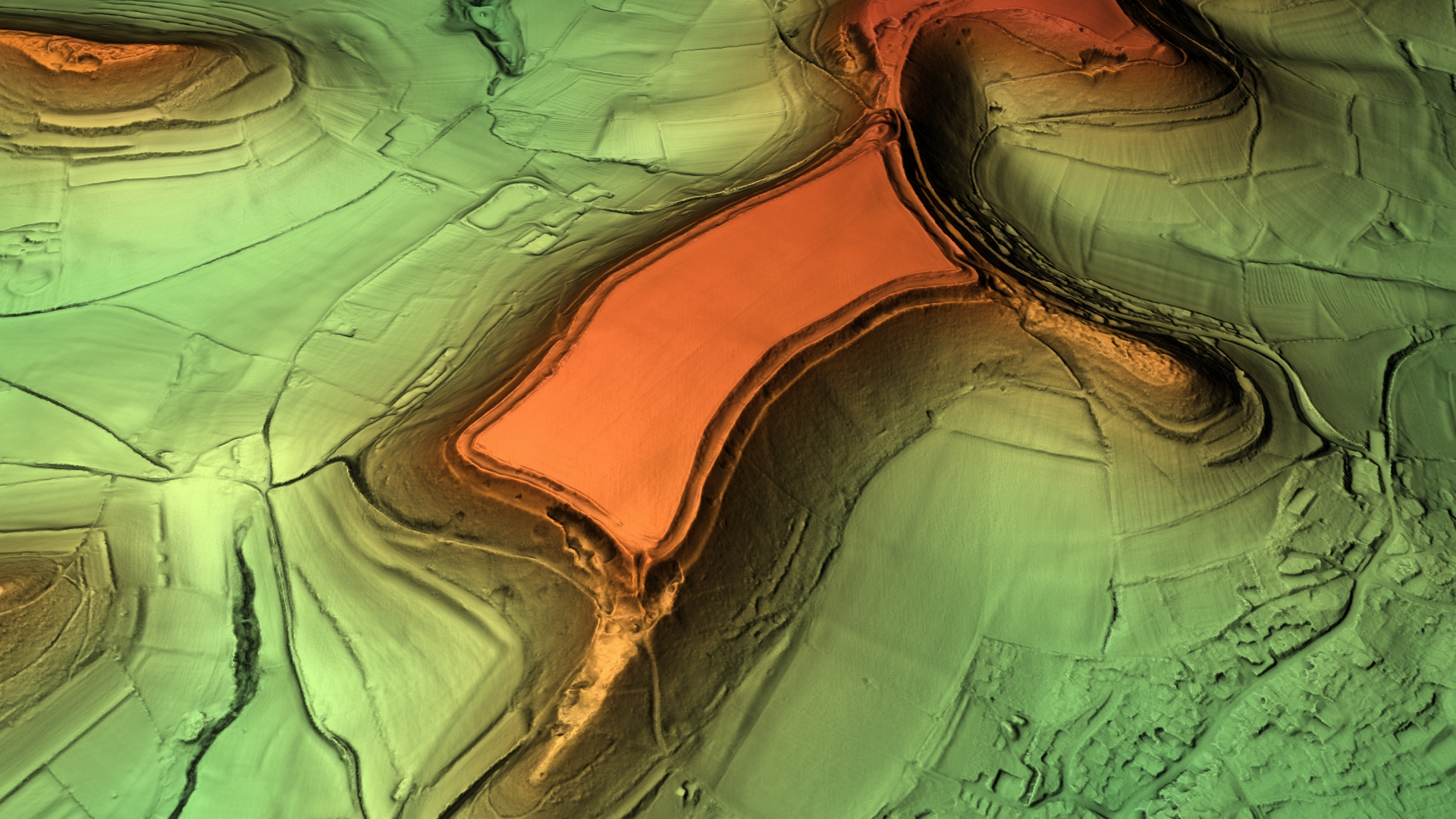
3D view of the digital terrain model

Uley Bury is a spur of the Cotswold escarpment, made up of thick beds of inferior oolitic limestone of the Jurassic period, overlying Bridport Sands. Part of the Bury is a Site of Special Scientific Interest (SSSI) famous for abundant fossils of Lower Jurassic age which occur here in the stratum known as the Cephalopod Bed. One particular horizon is especially noted for the ammonites it contains, which indicate that the strata are of early striatulum subzone age. Below in the Bridport Sand strata a thin, isolated sandstone layer contains what are elsewhere very rare ammonites, known as Haugia variabilis.

== Archaeology ==
Uley Bury hill fort is a very large Iron Age settlement with evidence of occupation from approximately 300BC to 100AD; it covers 32 acres (13 hectares). It is one of a number of hillforts that can be seen along the Cotswold escarpment, other notable examples being Crickley Hill and Painswick Beacon.

The Bury is surrounded on all sides, apart from at the northern corner, by steep natural slopes. The hill fort was created by terracing a double line of ramparts – more than a mile in length overall - into the hillsides.

Excavations carried out on the north eastern rampart during the 1970s found evidence of how the ramparts were constructed. Finds during this excavation included a crouched burial, iron currency bars, quern stones, a brooch, and large amounts of pottery. Finds made at other times include a gold coin of the Dobunni, and a silver Roman coin.

Aerial photography has revealed extensive crop marks suggesting that there were once numerous dwellings in the interior of the hill fort; however, these have not yet been excavated.

Uley Bury is a Scheduled Ancient Monument. Hetty Pegler's Tump, a notable Neolithic long barrow, and West Hill, the site of a Romano-British temple, are both nearby.

== Ecology ==
Uley Bury is an important wildlife habitat because of its unimproved limestone grassland, which has been created by centuries of grazing. The Bury lies in the Cotswold Area of Outstanding Natural Beauty (AONB) which holds a nationally significant concentration (52%) of all the unimproved Jurassic limestone grassland in the UK. A programme of regular summer grazing designed to conserve the grassland on the Bury was started in 2004.
