= List of schools in Gloucestershire =

This is a list of schools in Gloucestershire, England.

== State-funded schools ==
=== Primary schools ===
- Abbeymead Primary School, Abbeymead
- Amberley Parochial School, Amberley
- Ampney Crucis CE Primary School, Ampney Crucis
- Andoversford Primary School, Andoversford
- Ann Cam CE Primary School, Dymock
- Ann Edwards CE Primary School, South Cerney
- Ashchurch Primary School, Ashchurch
- Ashleworth CE Primary School, Ashleworth
- Avening Primary School, Avening
- Aylburton CE Primary School, Aylburton
- Barnwood CE Primary School, Barnwood
- Beech Green Primary School, Quedgeley
- Benhall Infant School, Benhall
- Berkeley Primary School, Berkeley
- Berry Hill Primary School, Berry Hill
- Bibury CE Primary School, Bibury
- Birdlip Primary School, Birdlip
- Bishop's Cleeve Primary Academy, Bishop's Cleeve
- Bisley Blue Coat CE Primary School, Bisley
- Blakeney Primary School, Blakeney
- Bledington Primary School, Bledington
- Blockley CE Primary School, Blockley
- Blue Coat CE Primary School, Wotton-under-Edge
- Bourton-on-the-Water Primary School, Bourton-on-the-Water
- Bream CE Primary School, Bream
- Brimscombe CE Primary School, Brimscombe
- The British School, Wotton-under-Edge
- Brockworth Primary Academy, Brockworth
- Bromesberrow St Mary's CE Primary School, Bromesberrow
- Bussage CE Primary School, Bussage
- Callowell Primary School, Stroud
- Calton Primary School, Gloucester
- Cam Everlands Primary School, Cam
- Cam Hopton CE Primary School, Cam
- Cam Woodfield Infant School, Cam
- Cam Woodfield Junior School, Cam
- Carrant Brook Junior School, Northway
- Cashes Green Primary School, Cashes Green
- Castle Hill Primary School, Brockworth
- Chalford Hill Primary School, Chalford Hill
- The Catholic School of Saint Gregory the Great, Cheltenham
- Charlton Kings Infants' School, Charlton Kings
- Charlton Kings Junior School, Charlton Kings
- Chesterton Primary School, Chesterton
- Christ Church CE Primary School, Cheltenham
- Churcham Primary School, Churcham
- Churchdown Parton Manor Infant School, Churchdown
- Churchdown Parton Manor Junior School, Churchdown
- Churchdown Village Infant School, Churchdown
- Churchdown Village Junior School, Churchdown
- Cirencester Primary School, Cirencester
- Clearwater CE Primary Academy, Quedgeley
- Clearwell CE Primary School, Clearwell
- Coaley CE Primary Academy, Coaley
- Coalway Community Primary School, Coleford
- Coberley CE Primary School, Coberley
- Cold Aston CE Primary School, Cold Aston
- Coney Hill Community Primary School, Gloucester
- Coopers Edge School, Brockworth
- Cotswold Chine School, Box
- Cranham CE Primary School, Cranham
- The Croft Primary School, Painswick
- Deerhurst and Apperley CE Primary School, Apperley
- Dinglewell Infant School, Hucclecote
- Dinglewell Junior School, Hucclecote
- Down Ampney CE Primary School, Down Ampney
- Drybrook Primary School, Drybrook
- Dunalley Primary School, Cheltenham
- Dursley CE Primary Academy, Dursley
- Eastcombe Primary School, Eastcombe
- Eastington Primary School, Eastington
- Ellwood Primary School, Ellwood
- Elmbridge Primary School, Gloucester
- English Bicknor CE Primary School, English Bicknor
- Fairford CE Primary School, Fairford
- Field Court CE Infant Academy, Quedgeley
- Field Court Junior School, Quedgeley
- Finlay Community School, Gloucester
- Forest View Primary School, Cinderford
- Foxmoor Primary School, Cashes Green
- Gardners Lane Primary School, Cheltenham
- Gastrells Community Primary School, Stroud
- Glebe Infants' School, Newent
- Glenfall Community Primary School, Charlton Kings
- Gloucester Road Primary School, Cheltenham
- Gotherington Primary School, Gotherington
- Grange Primary School, Gloucester
- Grangefield Primary School, Bishop's Cleeve
- Great Oldbury Primary Academy, Great Oldbury
- Greatfield Park Primary School, Up Hatherley
- Gretton Primary School, Gretton
- Hardwicke Parochial Academy, Hardwicke
- Haresfield CE Primary School, Haresfield
- Harewood Infant School, Gloucester
- Harewood Junior School, Gloucester
- Hartpury CE Primary School, Hartpury
- Hatherley Infant School, Gloucester
- Hatherop CE Primary School, Hatherop
- Hempsted Primary School, Hempsted
- Heron Primary School, Abbeydale
- Hesters Way Primary School, Cheltenham
- Highnam CE Primary Academy, Highnam
- Hillesley CE Primary School, Hillesley
- Hillview Primary School, Hucclecote
- Holy Apostles' CE Primary School, Charlton Kings
- Holy Trinity CE Primary School, Cheltenham
- Hope Brook CE Primary School, Longhope
- Horsley CE Primary School, Horsley
- Huntley CE Primary School, Huntley
- Hunts Grove Primary Academy, Hunts Grove
- Innsworth Infant School, Innsworth
- Innsworth Junior School, Innsworth
- Isbourne Valley School, Didbrook
- The John Moore Primary School, Walton Cardiff
- Kemble Primary School, Kemble
- Kempsford CE Primary School, Kempsford
- King's Stanley CE Primary School, King's Stanley
- Kingsholm CE Primary School, Gloucester
- Kingsway Primary School, Kingsway Village
- Kingswood Primary School, Kingswood
- Lakefield CE Primary School, Frampton on Severn
- Lakeside Primary School, Cheltenham
- Leckhampton CE Primary School, Leckhampton
- Leighterton Primary School, Leighterton
- Leonard Stanley CE Primary School, Leonard Stanley
- Linden Primary School, Gloucester
- Littledean CE Primary School, Littledean
- Longborough CE Primary School, Longborough
- Longford Park Primary Academy, Longford
- Longlevens Infant School, Longlevens
- Longlevens Junior School, Longlevens
- Longney CE Primary Academy, Longney
- Lydbrook Primary School, Lydbrook
- Lydney CE Primary School, Lydney
- Meadowside Primary School, Quedgeley
- Meysey Hampton CE Primary School, Meysey Hampton
- Mickleton Primary School, Mickleton
- Minchinhampton Primary Academy, Minchinhampton
- Miserden CE Primary School, Miserden
- Mitcheldean Endowed Primary School, Mitcheldean
- Mitton Manor Primary School, Tewkesbury
- Moat Primary School, Matson
- Nailsworth CE Primary School, Nailsworth
- Naunton Park Primary School, Cheltenham
- Newnham St Peter's CE Primary School, Newnham on Severn
- North Cerney CE Primary Academy, North Cerney
- North Nibley CE Primary School, North Nibley
- Northleach CE Primary School, Northleach
- Northway Infant School, Northway
- Norton CE Primary School, Norton
- Oak Hill CE Primary School, Alderton
- Oakridge Parochial School, Stroud
- Oakwood Primary School, Cheltenham
- Offa's Mead Academy, Sedbury
- Park Junior School, Stonehouse
- Parkend Primary School, Parkend
- Pauntley CE Primary School, Pauntley
- Picklenash Junior School, Newent
- Pillowell Community Primary School, Pillowell
- Powell's CE Primary School, Cirencester
- Prestbury St Mary's CE Junior School, Prestbury
- Primrose Hill CE Primary Academy, Lydney
- Queen Margaret Primary School, Tewkesbury
- Randwick CE Primary School, Randwick
- Redbrook CE Primary School, Redbrook
- Redmarley CE Primary School, Redmarley D'Abitot
- The Rissington School, Upper Rissington
- Robinswood Primary Academy, Matson
- Rodborough Community Primary School, Rodborough
- Rodmarton School, Rodmarton
- The Rosary RC Primary School, Stroud
- Rowanfield Infant School, Rowanfield
- Rowanfield Junior School, Rowanfield
- Ruardean CE Primary School, Ruardean
- St Andrew's CE Primary School, Chedworth
- St Briavels Parochial CE Primary School, St Briavels
- St Catherine's RC Primary School, Chipping Campden
- St David's CE Primary School, Moreton-in-Marsh
- St James and Ebrington CE Primary School, Chipping Campden
- St James CE Junior School, Gloucester
- St James' CE Primary School, Cheltenham
- St John's CE Academy, Coleford
- St John's CE Primary School, Cheltenham
- St Joseph's RC Primary School, Nympsfield
- St Lawrence CE Primary School, Lechlade
- St Mark's CE Junior School, Benhall
- St Mary's CE Infant School, Prestbury
- St Mary's CE Primary School, Tetbury
- St Mary's RC Primary School, Churchdown
- St Matthew's CE Primary School, Cainscross
- St Paul's CE Primary School, Gloucester
- St Peter's RC Primary School, Gloucester
- St Thomas More RC Primary School, Cheltenham
- St Whites's Primary School, Cinderford
- Sapperton CE Primary School, Sapperton
- Severnbanks Primary School, Lydney
- Sharpness Primary School, Sharpness
- Sheepscombe Primary School, Sheepscombe
- Sherborne CE Primary School, Sherborne
- Shurdington CE Primary School, Shurdington
- Siddington CE Primary School, Siddington
- Slimbridge Primary School, Slimbridge
- Soudley School, Soudley
- Southrop CE Primary School, Southrop
- Springbank Primary Academy, Cheltenham
- Staunton and Corse CE Primary School, Corse
- Steam Mills Primary School, Steam Mills
- Stone with Woodford CE Primary School, Stone
- Stonehouse Park Infant School, Stonehouse
- Stow-on-the-Wold Primary School, Stow-on-the-Wold
- Stratton CE Primary School, Stratton
- Stroud Valley Community Primary School, Stroud
- Swell CE Primary School, Lower Swell
- Swindon Village Primary School, Swindon Village
- Temple Guiting CE School, Temple Guiting
- Tewkesbury CE Primary School, Tewkesbury
- Thrupp School, Thrupp
- Tibberton Community Primary School, Tibberton
- Tirlebrook Primary School, Tewkesbury
- Tredington Community Primary School, Tredington
- Tredworth Infant Academy, Gloucester
- Tredworth Junior School, Gloucester
- Tutshill CE Primary School, Tutshill
- Twyning School, Twyning
- Uley CE Primary School, Uley
- Uplands Community Primary School, Stroud
- Upton St Leonards CE Primary School, Upton St Leonards
- Walmore Hill Primary School, Minsterworth
- Warden Hill Primary School, Cheltenham
- Watermoor CE Primary School, Cirencester
- Waterwells Primary Academy, Quedgeley
- Westbury-on-Severn CE Primary School, Westbury-on-Severn
- Whiteshill Primary School, Whiteshill
- Whitminster Endowed CE Primary School, Whitminster
- Widden Primary School, Gloucester
- Willersey CE Primary School, Willersey
- The Willow Primary Academy, Gloucester
- Winchcombe Abbey CE Primary School, Winchcombe
- Withington CE Primary School, Withington
- Woodchester Endowed CE Primary School, North Woodchester
- Woodmancote School, Woodmancote
- Woodside Primary School, Ruardean Woodside
- Woolaston Primary School, Woolaston
- Yorkley Primary School, Yorkley

=== Non-selective secondary schools ===
- All Saints' Academy, Cheltenham
- Archway School, Stroud
- Balcarras School, Charlton Kings
- Barnwood Park School, Barnwood
- Cheltenham Bournside School, Cheltenham
- Chipping Campden School, Chipping Campden
- Chosen Hill School, Churchdown
- Churchdown School Academy, Churchdown
- Cirencester Deer Park School, Cirencester
- Cirencester Kingshill School, Cirencester
- Cleeve School, Bishops Cleeve
- The Cotswold School, Bourton-on-the-Water
- The Dean Academy, Lydney
- Dene Magna School, Mitcheldean
- Farmor's School, Fairford
- Five Acres High School, Coleford
- The Forest High School, Cinderford
- Gloucester Academy, Gloucester
- Henley Bank High School, Gloucester
- The High School Leckhampton, Leckhampton
- Holmleigh Park High School, Gloucester
- Katharine Lady Berkeley's School, Wotton-under-Edge
- Maidenhill School, Stonehouse
- Newent Community School, Newent
- Pittville School, Cheltenham
- Rednock School, Dursley
- St Peter's High School, Gloucester
- Severn Vale School, Quedgeley
- SGS Berkeley Green UTC, Berkeley
- Sir William Romney's School, Tetbury
- Tewkesbury School, Tewkesbury
- Thomas Keble School, Eastcombe
- Winchcombe School, Winchcombe
- Wyedean School, Sedbury

=== Grammar schools ===
- The Crypt School, Gloucester
- Denmark Road High School, Gloucester
- Marling School, Stroud
- Pate's Grammar School, Cheltenham
- Ribston Hall High School, Gloucester
- Sir Thomas Rich's School, Longlevens
- Stroud High School, Stroud

=== Special and alternative schools ===
- Abbey View, Tewkesbury
- Alderman Knight School, Tewkesbury
- The Altus School, Cheltenham/Gloucester/Stroud
- Battledown School, Battledown
- Belmont School, Cheltenham
- Bettridge School, Cheltenham
- Brook Academy, Brockworth
- Gloucestershire Hospital Education Service, Cheltenham
- Heart of the Forest Community Special School, Coleford
- The Milestone School, Gloucester
- Paternoster School, Cirencester
- Peak Academy, Barton
- The Ridge Academy, Whaddon
- The Shrubberies School, Stonehouse
- Sladewood Academy, Stroud

=== Further education ===
- Cirencester College
- Gloucestershire College
- Hartpury College
- National Star College
- South Gloucestershire and Stroud College

== Independent schools ==
=== Primary and preparatory schools ===
- Airthrie School, Cheltenham
- Al-Ashraf Primary School, Gloucester
- Beaudesert Park School, Minchinhampton
- Berkhampstead School, Cheltenham
- Dean Close St John's, Tutshill
- Hatherop Castle School, Hatherop
- Hopelands Preparatory School, Stonehouse
- The Richard Pate School, Leckhampton
- St Edward's Preparatory School, Charlton Kings

=== Senior and all-through schools ===
- The Acorn School, Nailsworth
- Al-Ashraf Secondary School for Girls, Gloucester
- Cheltenham College, Cheltenham
- Cheltenham Ladies' College, Cheltenham
- Dean Close School, Cheltenham
- Edward Jenner School, Gloucester
- The King's School, Gloucester
- OneSchool Global UK, Berkeley
- OneSchool Global UK, Gloucester
- Rendcomb College, Cirencester
- St Edward's School, Charlton Kings
- Westonbirt School, Westonbirt
- Wotton House International School, Gloucester
- Wycliffe College, Stonehouse

=== Special and alternative schools ===
- Aurora Severnside School, Berkeley
- Brookthorpe Hall School, Brookthorpe
- Belong School Gloucestershire, Brookthorpe-with-Whaddon
- Hartmore School, Hartpury
- Norton College, Tewkesbury
- St Rose's Special School, Stroud
- Valley Bridge School, Whaddon
- William Morris School, Eastington
