= Bisley, Gloucestershire =

Village in Gloucestershire, England

Coordinates: 51.75351°N 2.14047°W

Bisley
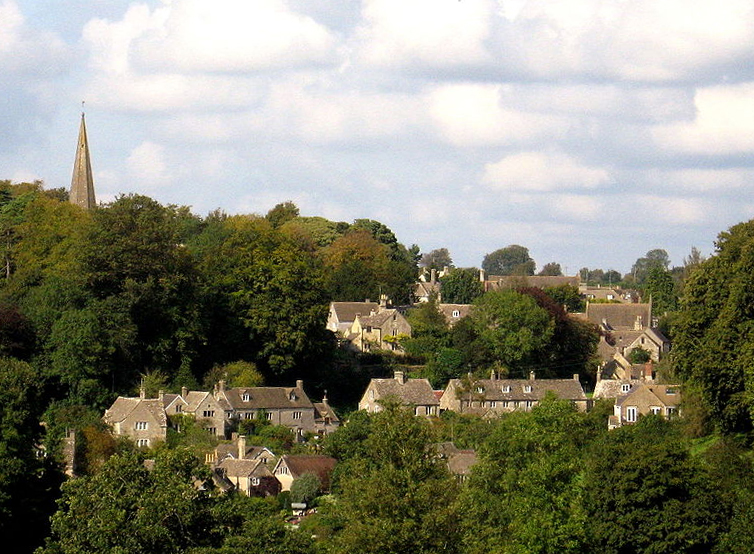
- A view over Bisley

- Location within Gloucestershire
- Population: 2,142 (2011)
- OS grid reference: SO905065
- Civil parish: Bisley-with-Lypiatt
- District: Stroud
- Shire county: Gloucestershire
- Region: South West
- Country: England
- Sovereign state: United Kingdom
- Post town: Stroud
- Postcode district: GL6
- Police: Gloucestershire
- Fire: Gloucestershire
- Ambulance: South Western
- UK Parliament: North Cotswolds

Bisley is a village in the civil parish of Bisley-with-Lypiatt, in the Stroud district, in Gloucestershire, England, about 4 miles (6 km) east of Stroud. The once-extensive manor included Stroud and Chalford, Thrupp, Oakridge, Bussage, Througham and Eastcombe.

== Governance ==
An electoral ward in the name Bisley exists. The ward has the same area and population as the civil parish of "Bisley-with-Lypiatt".

In 1891 the parish had a population of 5171. The parish was abolished in 1894 to form "Bisley with Lypiatt" and Chalford.

== History and architecture ==
The area is noted for the wealth of its Cotswold stone houses of architectural and historic interest. They include Lypiatt Park, formerly the home of Judge H. B. D. Woodcock and then of the late Modernist sculptor Lynn Chadwick; Nether Lypiatt Manor, formerly the home of Violet Gordon-Woodhouse and Prince and Princess Michael of Kent; Daneway (near Sapperton, but within the parish of Bisley); Over Court; Througham Court (repaired in 1929 for the novelist Sir Michael Sadleir by Norman Jewson); and Jaynes Court, formerly the private residence of Simon Isaacs, 4th Marquess of Reading.

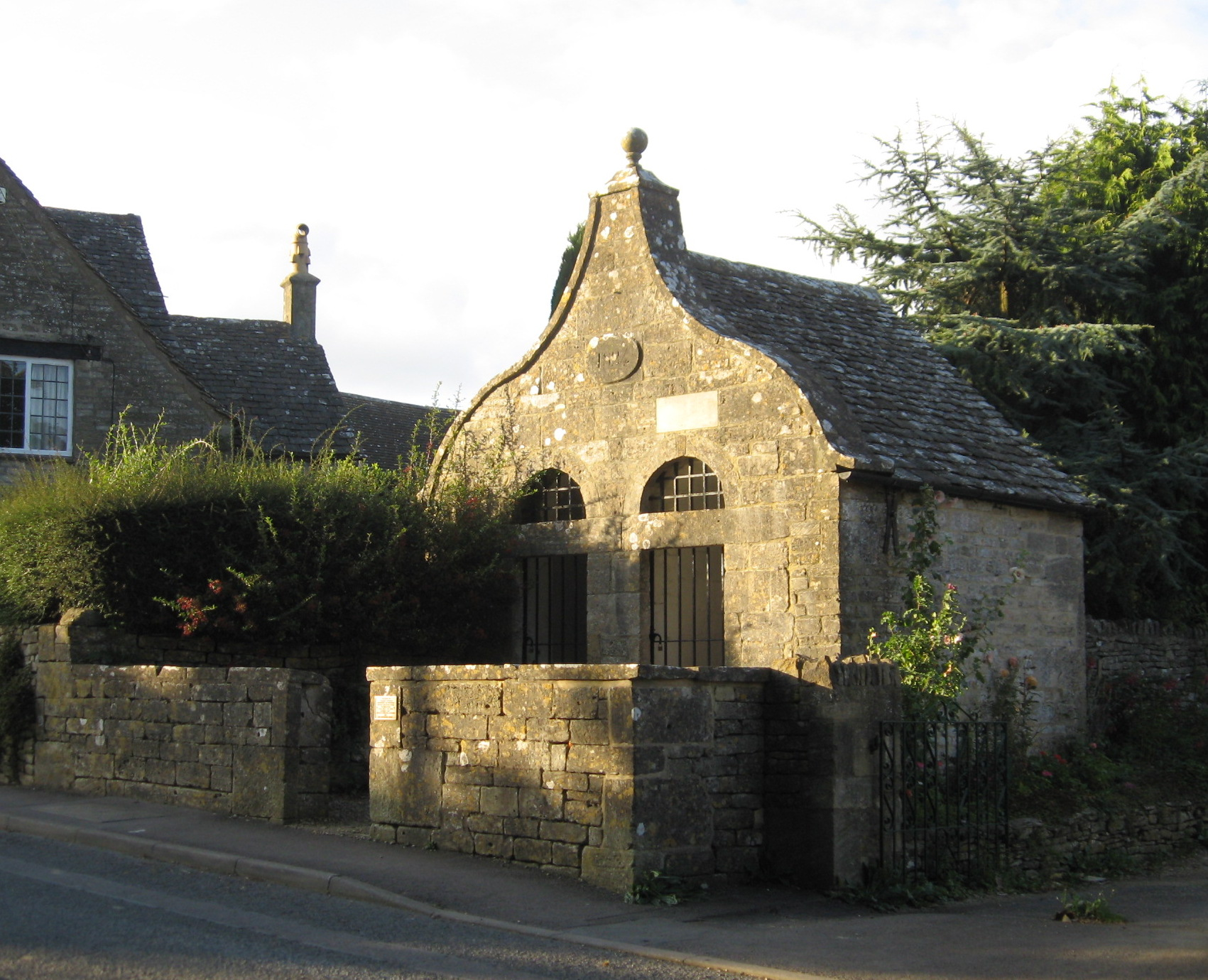
Bisley lockup

Througham Slad Manor is believed to date from the mid-16th century with 18th century additions, the manor was altered in the 1930s by Norman Jewson for W. A. Cadbury. In the 1970s, the house was owned by Mike Oldfield, who installed a recording studio in the barn.

The village prison, which had originally been located in the churchyard, was replaced in 1824 by a two-cell lock-up, where drunks were kept overnight, and petty criminals were detained before appearing before the magistrate. This was often followed by a spell in the stocks or pillory. This building still stands, minus its heavy oak doors.

Bisley has a structure on Wells Road, containing seven spouts forming a public water supply from the Seven Springs and is known for its well dressing.

There is a Saxon wayside cross on the wide verge of Bisley Road, south-west of Stancombe Toll House.

=== Church history ===
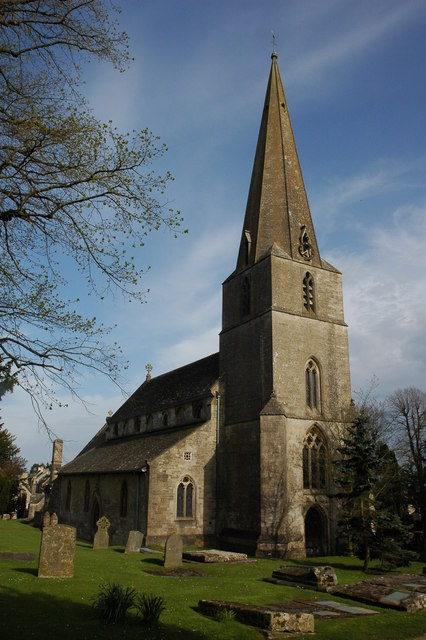
The church of All Saints was mostly rebuilt in the early 1860s.

The parish church of All Saints may originally have been an Anglo-Saxon minster. Between 1827 and 1873 the Vicar was Thomas Keble, a Tractarian and a pioneer in parish ministry. Thomas Keble was the younger brother of John Keble. His son Thomas Keble succeeded him as Vicar.

== Notable residents ==
- Denis Parsons Burkitt, surgeon and cancer researcher, lived latterly in Bisley and was buried there in 1993.
- Mary Chandler, composer, oboist and pianist, lived in Bisley from 1972 until the mid-1990s.
- Mike Oldfield, musician, lived and recorded at Througham Slad Manor in the 1970s.
- Bisley was the home of journalist and novelist Jilly Cooper from 1982 until her death in 2025. It was also the home of her husband, the publisher Leo Cooper, until his death in 2013.
- Michael Sadleir (1888–1957), publisher, novelist, book collector and bibliographer, lived in Bisley from 1929 to 1949.

== Gallery ==
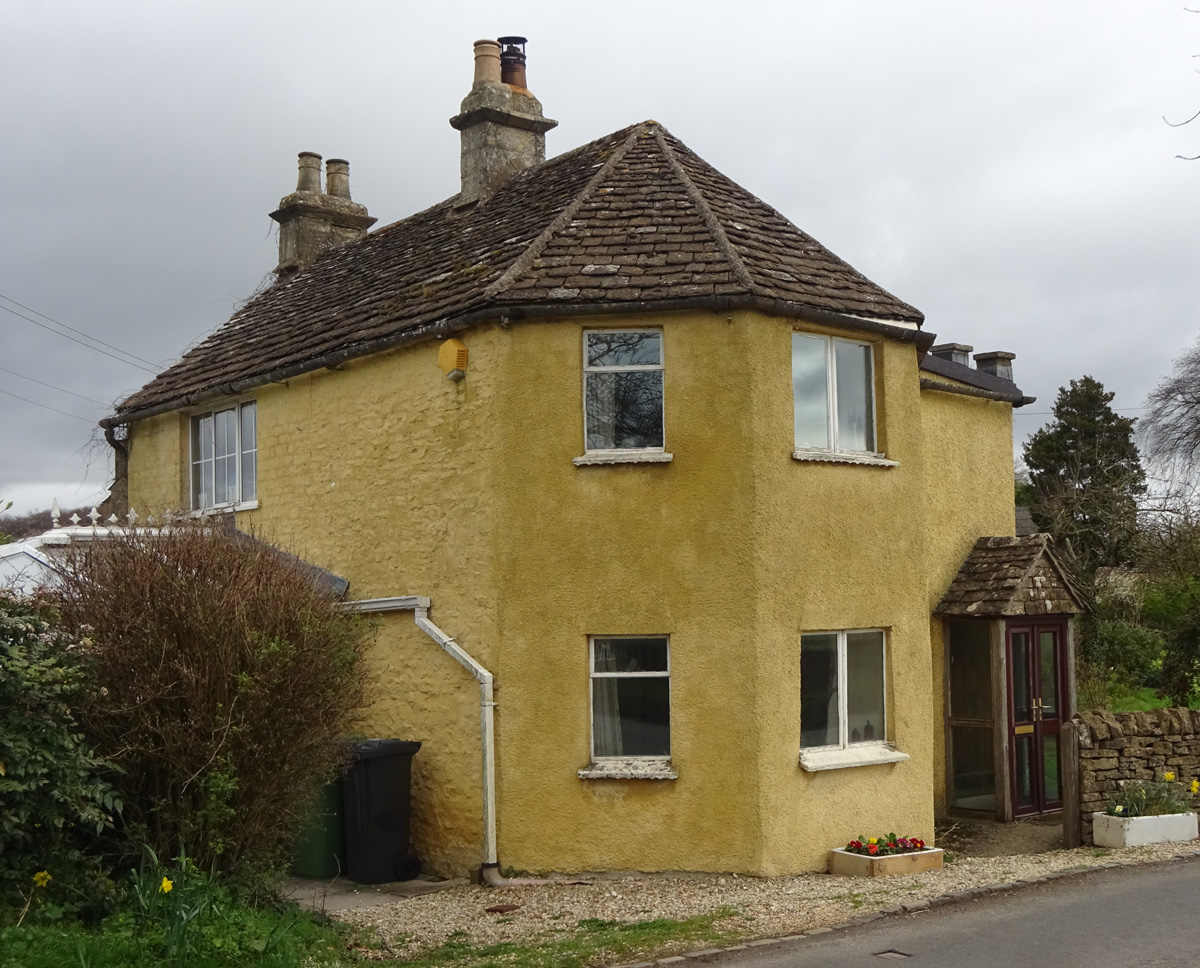
Stancombe Toll House

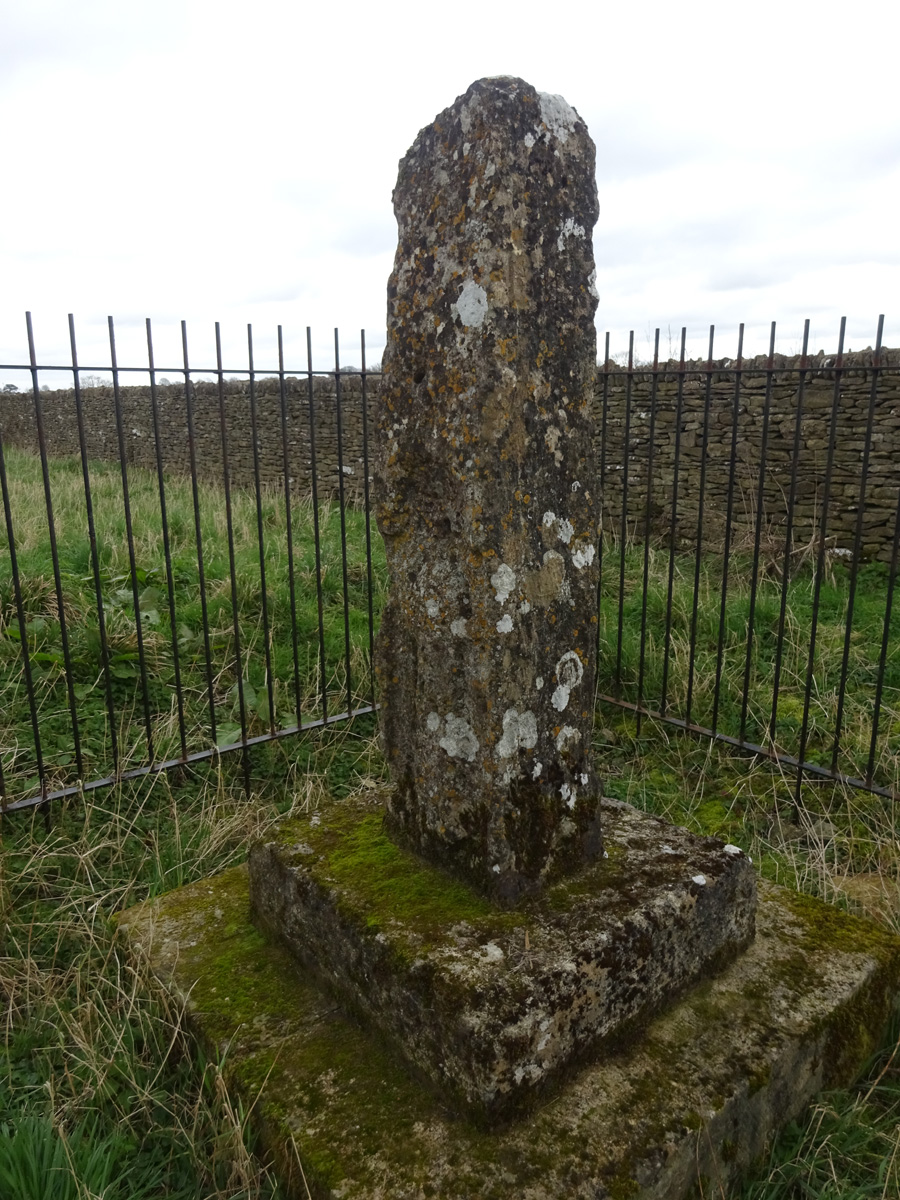
The Cross-shaft

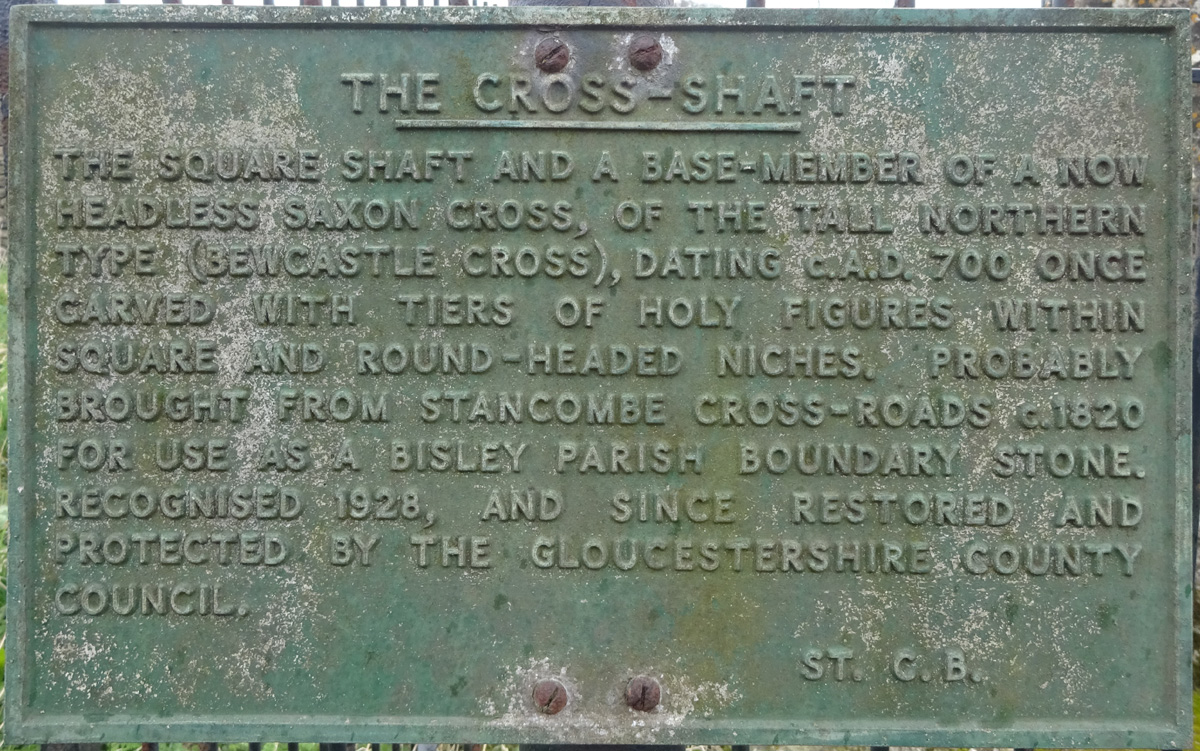
The plaque

== See also ==
- Bisley Boy
