= Stroud =

Town in Gloucestershire, England

Coordinates: 51.744°N 2.215°W

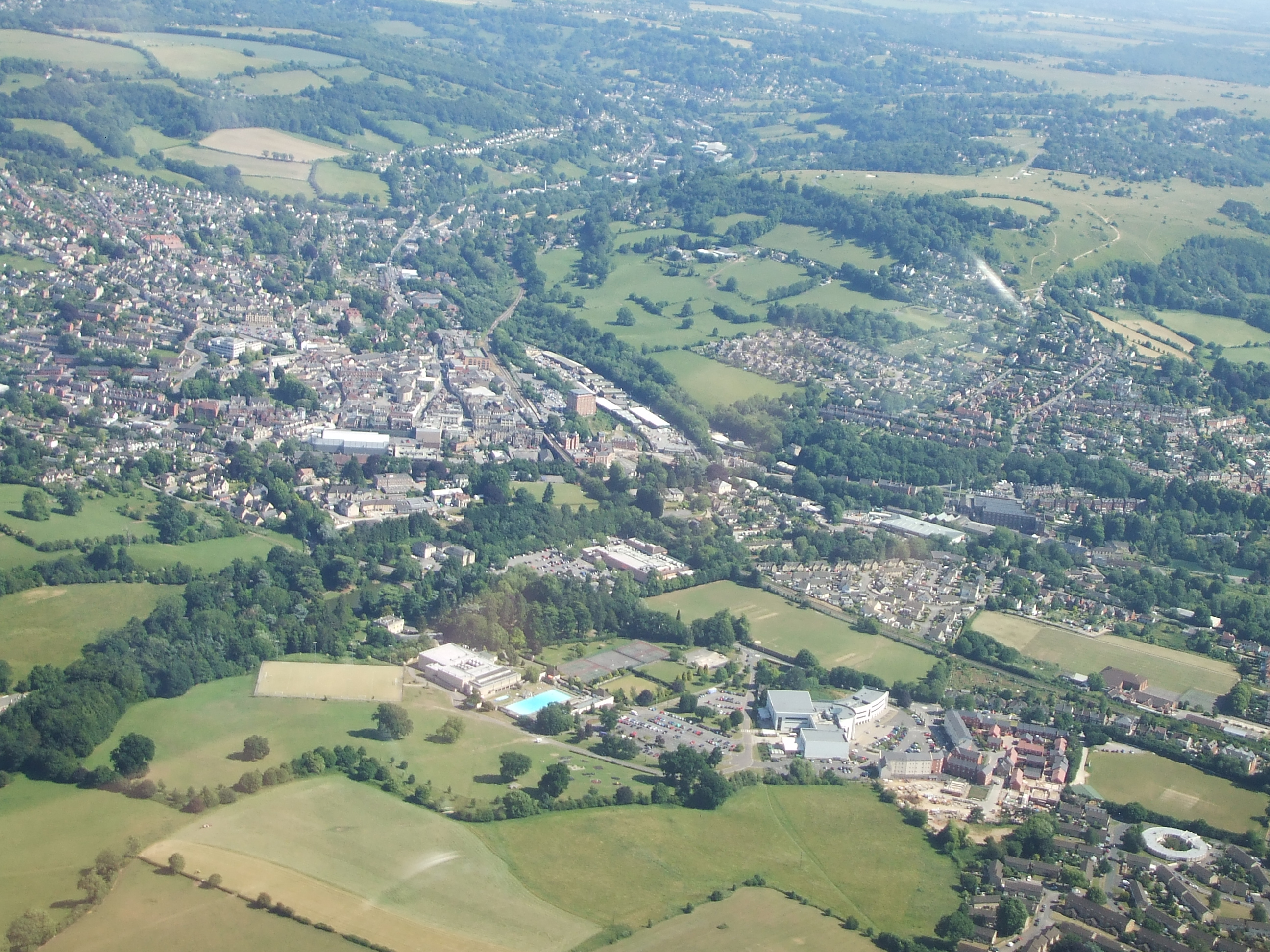
- Stroud from the air

- Location within Gloucestershire
- Population: 13,468 (2021 Census)
- OS grid reference: SO851051
- Civil parish: Stroud
- District: Stroud
- Shire county: Gloucestershire
- Region: South West
- Country: England
- Sovereign state: United Kingdom
- Post town: STROUD
- Postcode district: GL5
- Dialling code: 01453
- Police: Gloucestershire
- Fire: Gloucestershire
- Ambulance: South Western
- UK Parliament: Stroud

Stroud

Climate chart (precipitation, max. and min. temperature)
J	F	M	A	M	J	J	A	S	O	N	D
60 8 3	41 8 2	59 10 4	31 15 6	72 17 9	49 21 11	81 22 13	43 21 13	44 19 11	58 15 9	82 10 5	66 7 3
- █ Average max. and min. temperatures in °C
- █ Precipitation totals in mm
- Source: Selsley Weather (Average, 2005–2009)
Imperial conversion
J	F	M	A	M	J	J	A	S	O	N	D
2.4 46 38	1.6 46 36	2.3 51 38	1.2 58 42	2.8 63 47	1.9 70 52	3.2 71 56	1.7 70 55	1.7 67 52	2.3 59 48	3.2 50 41	2.6 45 37
- █ Average max. and min. temperatures in °F
- █ Precipitation totals in inches

Stroud is a market town and civil parish in Gloucestershire, England. It is the main town in Stroud District. The town's population was 13,500 in 2021.

Sited below the western escarpment of the Cotswold Hills, at the meeting point of the Five Valleys, the town is noted for its steep streets. The Cotswold Area of Outstanding Natural Beauty surrounds the town, and the Cotswold Way path passes by it to the west. It lies 10 miles (16 km) south of the city of Gloucester, 14 miles (23 km) south-southwest of Cheltenham, 13 miles (21 km) west-northwest of Cirencester and 26 miles (42 km) north-east of the city of Bristol. London is 91 miles (146 km) east-southeast of Stroud and the Welsh border at Whitebrook, Monmouthshire, is 19 miles (31 km) to the west. Though officially not part of the town itself, the contiguous civil parishes of Rodborough and Cainscross form part of Stroud's urban area and are generally recognised as suburbs.

Stroud acts as a commercial centre for surrounding villages and market towns including Amberley, Bisley, Bussage, Chalford, Dursley, Eastcombe, Eastington, King's Stanley, Leonard Stanley, Minchinhampton, Nailsworth, Oakridge, Painswick, Randwick, Selsley, Sheepscombe, Slad, Stonehouse, Brimscombe & Thrupp, Whiteshill and Woodchester.

In March 2021 The Sunday Times named Stroud the best place to live in the UK, citing the town's abundance of green spaces, independent spirit, and high quality of schools.

== Etymology ==
Stroud was named La Strode in a document of 1221, though most early records use the spelling Stroud. The Old English name Strōd refers to a "marshy land overgrown with brushwood". Although the name is now pronounced to rhyme with "proud", its original pronunciation survives in the Kent town of Strood, which has the same etymology.

== History ==
Stroud is known for its involvement in the Industrial Revolution. It was a cloth town: woollen mills were powered by the small rivers which flow through the five valleys, and supplied from Cotswold sheep which grazed on the hills above. Particularly noteworthy was the production of military uniforms in the colour Stroudwater Scarlet. Stroud became known for its production of broadcloth, which was widely known as "Stroud cloth" and traded around the world. The area became home to a sizable Huguenot community in the 17th century, fleeing from persecution in Catholic France, followed by a significant Jewish presence in the 19th century, linked to the tailoring and cloth industries. There were two synagogues by 1889, but these became disused by around 1908.

Stroud was an industrial and trading location in the 19th century, and so needed transport links. It first had a canal network in the form of the Stroudwater Navigation and the Thames & Severn Canal, both of which survived until the early 20th century. Restoration of these canals as a leisure facility by a partnership of Stroud District Council and the Cotswold Canals Trust is well under way with a multimillion-pound Lottery grant. Stroud railway station (on the Gloucester–Swindon Golden Valley Line) was designed by Isambard Kingdom Brunel.

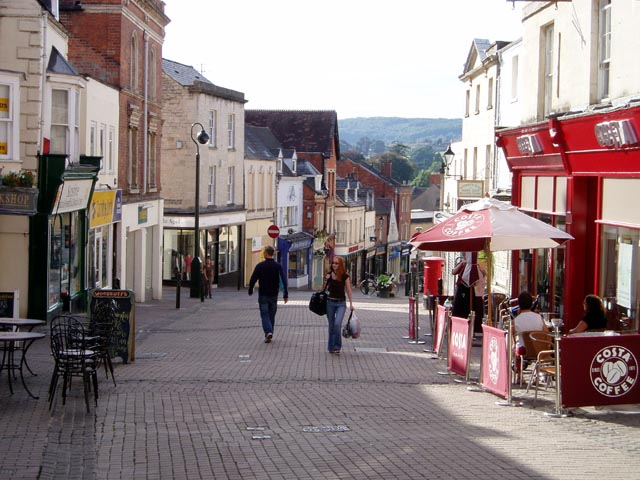
High Street, the main shopping street

Though there is much evidence of early historic settlement and transport, Stroud parish was originally part of Bisley, and only began to emerge as a distinct unit in the 13th century, taking its name from the marshy ground at the confluence of the Slad Brook and the River Frome called "La Strode", and was first recorded in 1221. The church was built by 1279, and it was assigned parochial rights by the rectors of Bisley in 1304, often cited as the date of Stroud's foundation.

Historic buildings and places of interest in the area include the Neolithic long barrows at Uley, Selsley Common and Nympsfield to the west; Roman era remains at Frocester, West Hill near Uley, and Woodchester; the medieval buildings at Beverston Castle; and the outstanding Tudor houses at Newark Park and Owlpen Manor. Woodchester Mansion is a masterpiece of the Gothic Revival by local architect Benjamin Bucknall.

From 1837 to 1841, Stroud's MP was Lord John Russell of the Whig party, who later became prime minister. Russell was an important politician: he was responsible for passing Acts of Parliament such as the Public Health Act 1848, but he is mainly remembered as one of the chief architects of the Reform Act 1867. This Act, also known as the Second Reform Act, gave the vote to every urban male householder, not just those of considerable means. This increased the electorate by 1.5 million voters. Lord John Russell is remembered in the town in the names of two streets, John Street and Russell Street, as well as the Lord John public house. In 1835 the local press referred to Lord John Russell's opportunism in choosing Stroud as his new constituency as 'trying his hand in the vales of Gotham', a reference to a 1798 poem mocking Stroud residents for opening a church organ "before it could speak". "Gotham" was a popular local town nickname and "house" name at Eastcombe Manor school in the 1940s and 1950s.

=== Neolithic remains ===
The long barrow at Randwick measures about 56 by 26 metres (184 by 85 ft), and stands 4 metres (13 ft) high at the north-east end. Excavations in 1883 found an opening to the north-east, from which there was access to a simple square chamber of one cell containing disarticulated human remains. Traces of the chamber can still be seen, although it is not accessible. Additional burials were found adjacent to the barrow on the south-west side.

The Iron Age tribesmen of Gloucestershire made their final stand against the massive Roman invasion on Minchinhampton Common. Survivors eventually fled to the north. Some earthworks, known as 'the Bulwarks', and the Longstone of Minchinhampton are evidence of these ancient fortifications.

=== Roman remains ===
Woodchester Roman Villa is one of many Roman villas discovered in Gloucestershire. It was occupied between the early 2nd and late 4th centuries AD. There is now nothing visible of the villa above ground and the site is occupied by a churchyard. The villa's most famous feature is the Orpheus mosaic, the second largest of its kind in Europe and one of the most intricate. It dates to c. 325 CE and was re-discovered by Gloucestershire-born antiquarian Samuel Lysons in 1793. It has been uncovered seven times since 1880, the last time in 1973. It depicts Orpheus charming all forms of life with his lyre and has been praised for its accuracy and beauty.

Remains of another Roman villa have been found in the parish of Painswick, on a farm called Highfield, about 1/2 mile (800 metres) northwest of the town. Walls were found, crossing one another at right angles; also many flue tiles, and some Roman coins.

The excavation at a site at Ebley Road in Stonehouse has revealed evidence of some of the earliest Roman activity known in the Stroud Valleys. A large rectangular enclosure dating back to the 1st century AD was found and more than a dozen human skeletons were unearthed at the end of 2010.

== Demography ==
At the 2001 UK census, Stroud civil parish had a total population of 12,690. For every 100 females, there were 96.4 males. Ethnically, the population is predominantly white (98.2%). 20.6% of the population were under the age of 16 and 8.3% were aged 75 and over; the mean age of the people of the urban area was 39.5. 92.6% of residents described their health as "fair" or better, similar to the average of 92.8% for the wider district. The average household size was 2.4. Of those aged 16–74, 24.5% had no academic qualifications, lower than the national average of 28.9%. Of those aged 16–74, 2.6% were unemployed and 28.4% were economically inactive. At the 2011 census, 107,026 people were described as white British, plus 591 being from the Irish Republic. 2,752 were white other, 364 Caribbean, 129 African, 429 Asian and 300 other Asian, all from mixed multiple ethnic groups. Of these, India, Pakistan and Bangladesh accounted for 258 people. Chinese and Arab people accounted for 226 people.

There are two definitions for the town of Stroud. The narrowest definition is the parish, which had a population of 13,259 in 2011 and only includes the town centre and inner suburban areas. The urban subdivision had a population of 32,670 and includes many suburbs often considered part of the town. The urban area, which includes Stonehouse that has a largely separate identity, and other surrounding villages had a population of 60,155. Despite its extensive urban area, Stroud is surrounded by the greenbelt of the Cotswolds to the north, south and east.

== Character and amenities ==
Stroud has a significant artistic community that dates back to the early 20th century. Jasper Conran called Stroud "the Covent Garden of the Cotswolds"; the Daily Telegraph has referred to it as "the artistic equivalent of bookish Hay-on-Wye"; while the London Evening Standard likened the town to "Notting Hill with wellies". The town has a large and diverse number of creative artists and musicians.

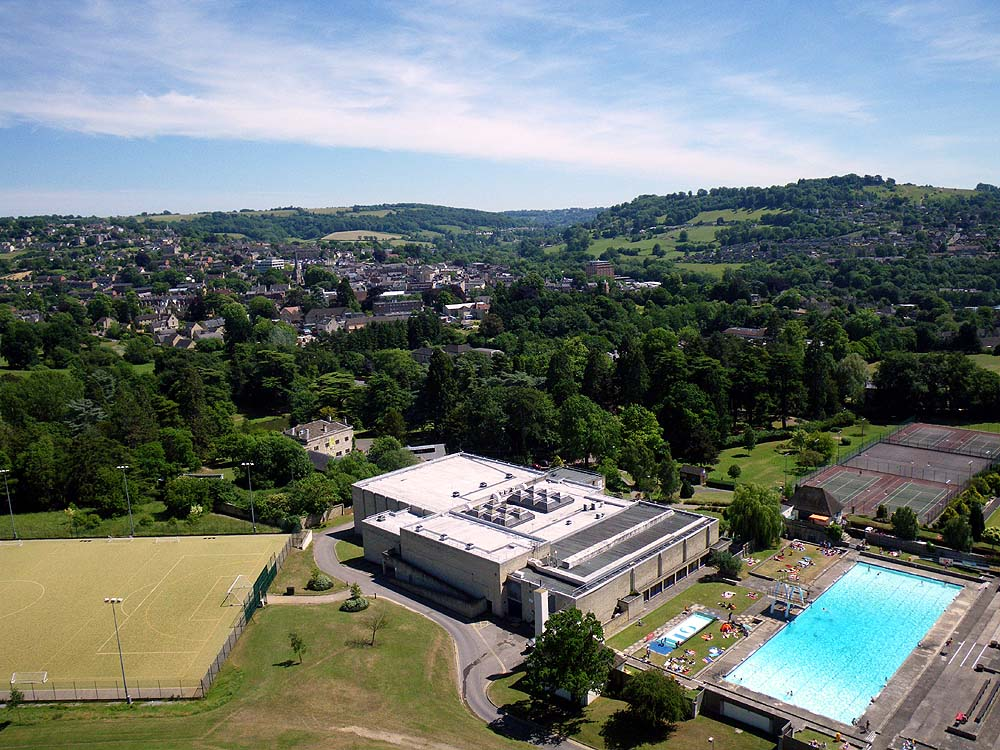
Kite aerial photo of Stroud Leisure Centre

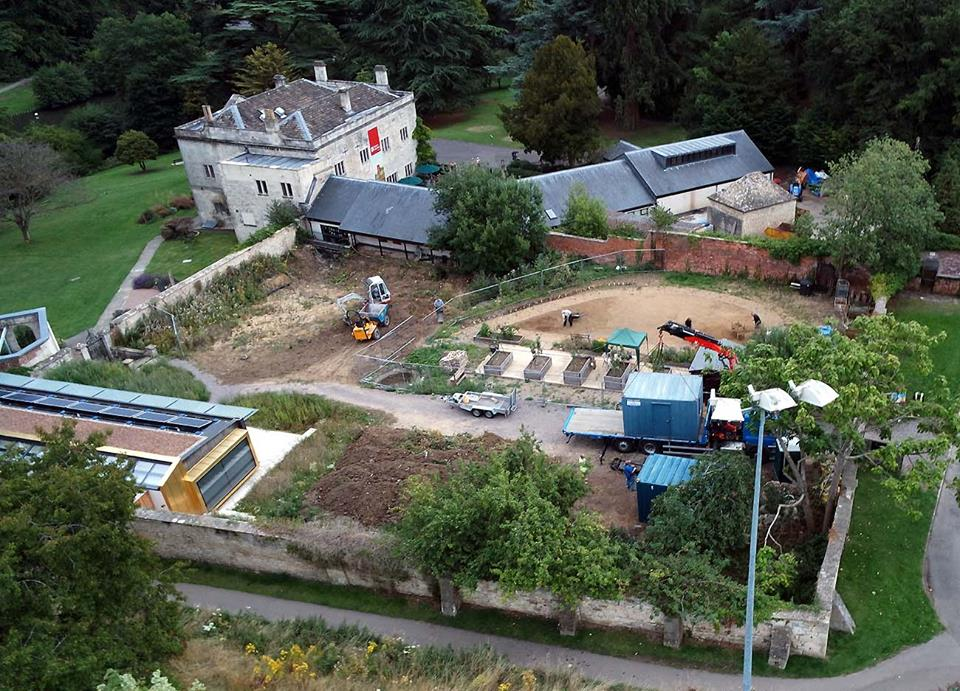
Kite aerial photograph of the restoration of the walled garden at the Museum in the Park.

The town was one of the birthplaces of the organic food movement and was home to Britain's first fully organic café. The Biodynamic Agricultural Association is based in the town.

For many years Stroud has hosted a fringe festival on the second weekend in September. A new committee took over in early 2015 and now holds the festival on August Bank Holiday each year. The festival has been expanded to cover art and literature, as well as a diverse range of unsigned or independent bands. With a number of outdoor stages, and the majority of the venues in town taking part, over 400 performers can be seen free of charge over the course of the weekend. The town also hosts an annual series of lectures and exhibitions on contemporary textiles and textile culture called SELECT, run by Stroud International Textiles, an event that exhibits international textiles.

The Stroudwater Textile Trust was founded in 1999 to link the past and present of textiles in the Five Valleys and to manage the opening of several mills in which historic textile machinery, including a working waterwheel, has been restored and is demonstrated. The Trust has produced a DVD, Rivers of Cloth, using archive film and interviews which was due to be released in early 2011 and a photographic survey of surviving woollen mills was undertaken for a book, Wool and Water, published in 2012.

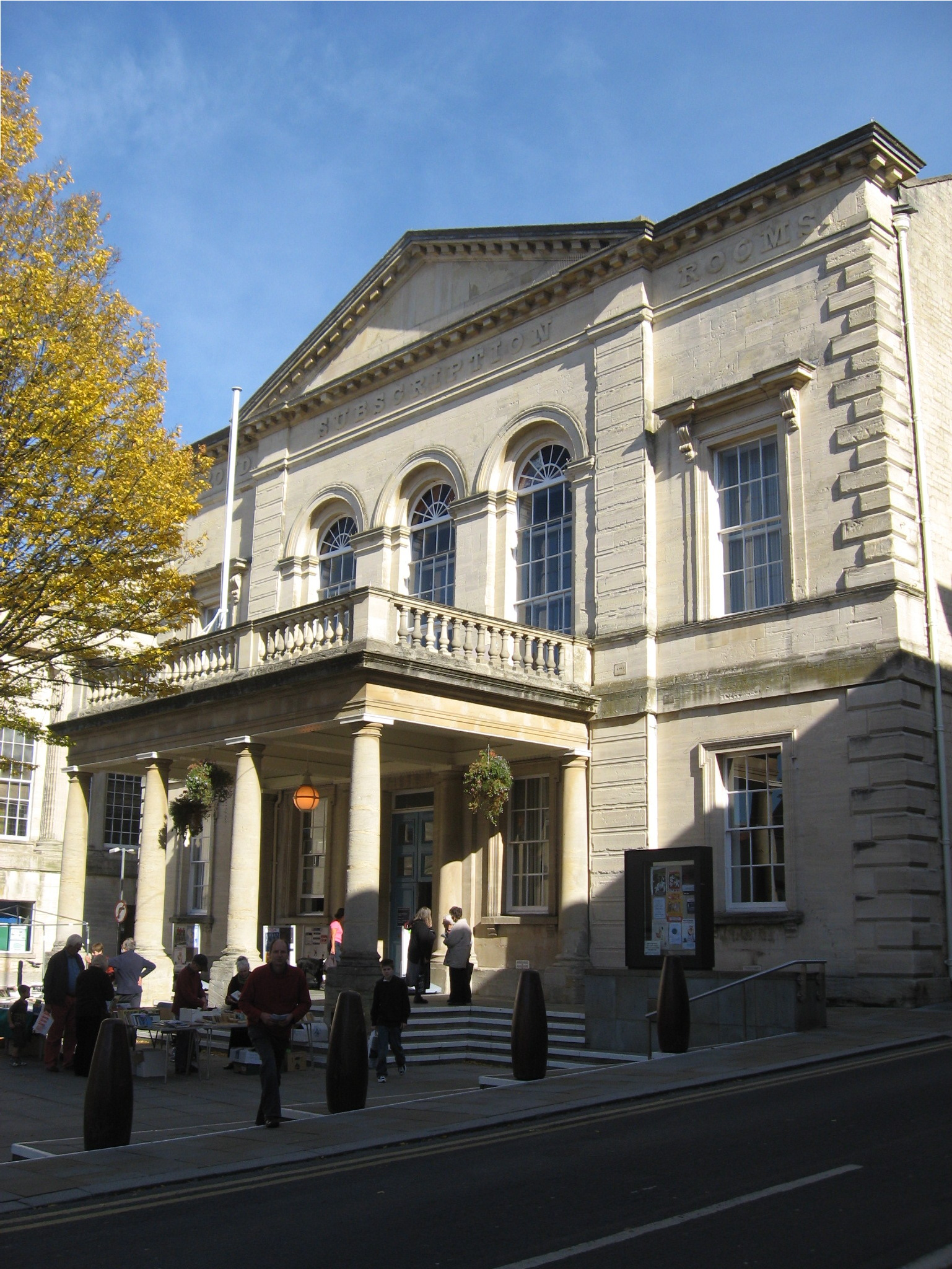
Subscription Rooms

The Subscription Rooms at the centre of the town centre provide a venue for a variety of entertainment. There is also a small theatre, the Cotswold Playhouse, which is home to the amateur Cotswold Players; it occasionally hosts visiting professional companies.

On the fringes of the town are Stratford Park, originally the park of a small local weaver, now home to a leisure centre with an indoor and an outdoor swimming pool, and the Museum in the Park. Housed in a Grade II listed 17th-century wool merchant's house, the museum collection tells the story of the Stroud District's history. It has over 4,000 objects on display, including dinosaur bones, historical paintings and one of the world's first lawnmowers. In addition to the main displays there is a modern extension which includes a purpose-built art gallery showing a varied programme of exhibitions. Behind this is a contemporary walled garden.

The Redlers industrial estate is the site of the original Dudbridge Mills, beside the River Frome. From the mid-18th century onwards it housed the three mills of Daniel Chance: one corn, one gig and a dyehouse with eight drying racks. It was acquired in 1794 by John Apperley, whose family used the site for wool- and cloth-making for the next 140 years. In 1801 an industrial accident killed a young worker.

=== Campaigns ===
Stroud citizens have a history of protest going back to the Stroudwater Riots of 1825. In the late 1970s Stroud Campaign Against The Ringroad prevented Gloucestershire County Council's attempt to introduce new traffic plans. A few years later Stroud District Council tried to demolish 18th-century buildings in the town centre. Stroud High Street Action Group, with some rooftop protests and a high court judgement, demonstrated against this. The restored buildings are now a feature of the High Street. After a short occupation a compromise was reached in the demolition of buildings in Cornhill with many being saved, including one identified as a medieval house. This campaign led to the formation of the Stroud Preservation Trust which has been instrumental in saving many of the town's oldest buildings such as Withey's house, the Brunel Goods Shed and the Hill Paul building.

In 1989 Stroud District Council tried to fell at midnight thirteen trees in Stratford Park near the road, which attracted national and international attention. Local Save The Trees campaigners had got in position first and prevented the felling, which was intended to allow road-widening. Campaigners occupied the trees for the next six weeks while, with the help of Friends of the Earth, introducing the County Surveyor to 'traffic calming' which he agreed to adopt instead of changing the road alignment. During the next five years County Surveyors' figures showed a fifty per cent decrease in accidents along this part of Stratford Road. The trees still survive.

In 2000 Stroud District Council gave permission for the Victorian landmark Hill Paul building to be demolished. After thwarting demolition, local activists formed a company and sold enough shares at £500 each to take an option on the building, which they passed on to a local developer. The building has now been restored and converted into apartments (see photo on the right). The full records of the Hill Paul building campaign are with the Gloucestershire Archivist at D9242/Accession 11679/3.

The Save Stroud Hospitals Taskforce has been campaigning since spring 2006 against a range of cuts to health services in and around Stroud, with thousands of people taking part in street demonstrations. Stroud Maternity Hospital was saved in September 2006.

The Uplands Post Office branch in Stroud was one of 26 in the county to shut as part of a nationwide programme to cut losses. Following local opposition, the Post Office agreed to talks with civic chiefs to look at how it could reopen. The town council agreed to provide £10,000 of funding for the service in 2008 and up to £25,000 for 2009. In November 2008 it was confirmed that Stroud has become only the second place in Britain to save one of its Post Offices.

In September 2010 the BNP scrapped plans to move their national media centre to Stroud after protests by local residents.

In February 2012 NHS managers agreed to halt plans for Stroud General Hospital to be run by a social enterprise after local residents mounted a legal challenge in the High Court.

== Business ==
The Stroud and Swindon Building Society had its headquarters there until it merged with the Coventry Building Society in September 2010. The building is now the headquarters of the renewable energy provider Ecotricity.

Damien Hirst owns the 'Science' facility in Stroud which produces his art.

In September 2009, the Stroud Pound Co-operative launched the Stroud Pound as an attempt to reinforce the local economy and encourage more local production. The currency's design follows that of the Chiemgauer, in being backed on a one-for-one basis by the national currency, having a charge for redemption which is donated to local charities, and including a system of demurrage to encourage rapid circulation.

== Farmers' market ==
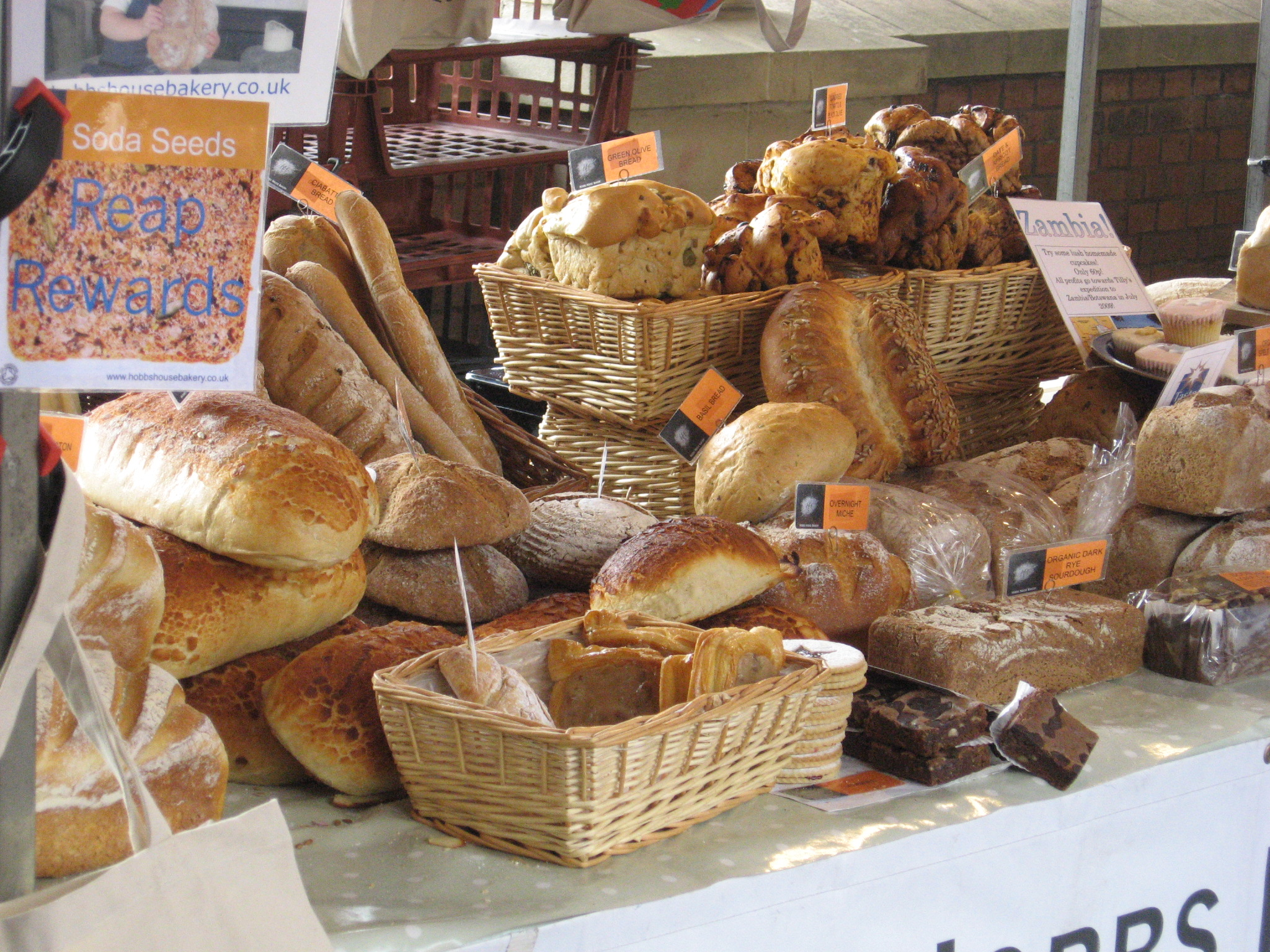
Bread loaves in the farmers' market

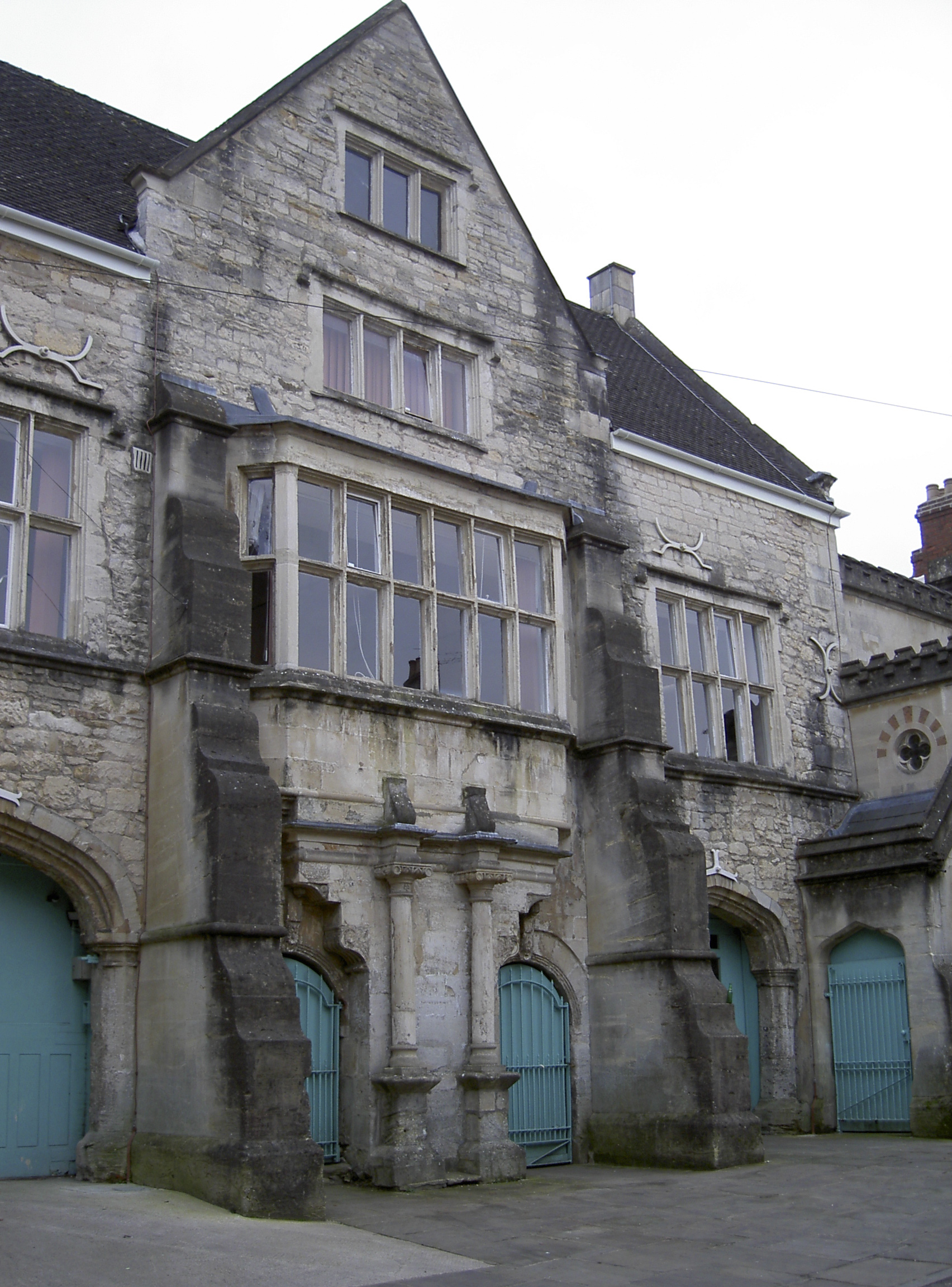
The Old Town Hall

A farmers' market, launched by Jasper Conran and Isabella Blow on 3 July 1999, takes place every Saturday at the Cornhill market. It was nominated for the national Farmers' Market of the Year in 2001 and won it in 2007 and 2013. It also won the Cotswold Life magazine award for the best farmers' market in Gloucestershire in 2003, 2004, 2005 and 2010. The market featured in an episode of BBC TV's The Hairy Bikers' Food Tour of Britain in September 2009, and won the Best Food Market award at the BBC Food & Farming Awards 2010. It is certified by FARMA.

In addition to the farmers' market there is a smaller market held (Fri & Sat) in The Shambles, an area adjacent to the steep High Street. John Wesley preached from a butcher's block in The Shambles on 26 June 1742. The Old Town Hall is one of the oldest existing buildings in Stroud: originally referred to as the market house, it was built in 1596 and is still in occasional use today.

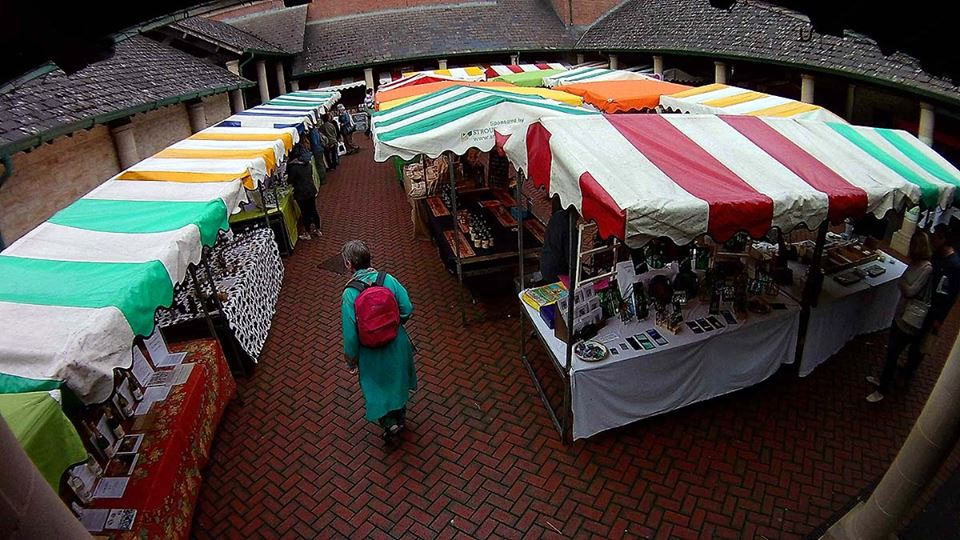
Stroud Farmers' Market

== Education ==
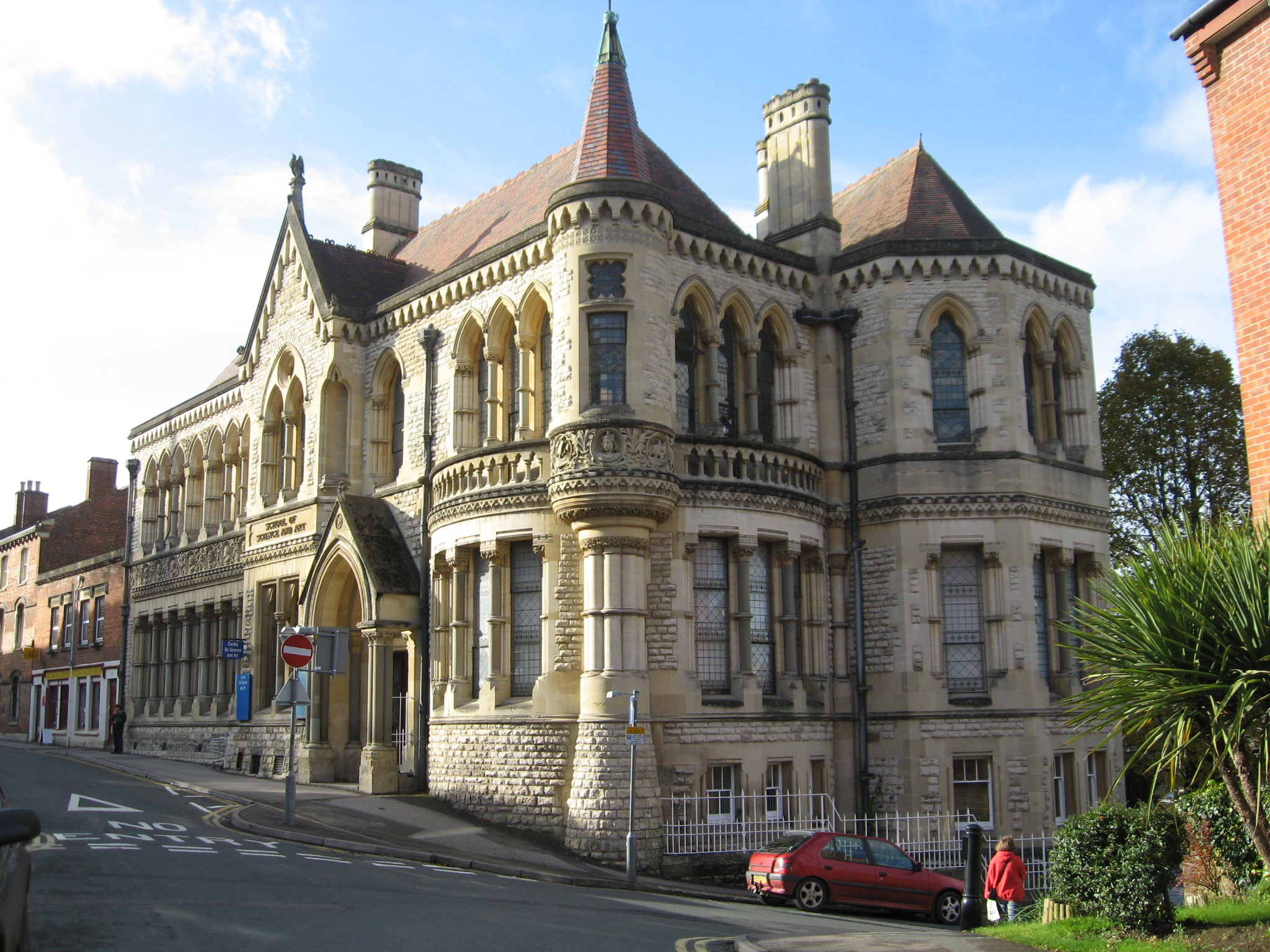
School of Science and Art

=== History ===
"There was a school at Stroud in 1576 but the schoolmaster, who did not have a licence and failed to teach the catechism, was then dismissed..."

=== Secondary schools ===
There are three secondary schools in Stroud.

Archway School is a County Council maintained comprehensive school offering an 11-to-18 education for children in Stroud, Rodborough and Cainscross.

There are also two state-funded selective schools, Marling School and Stroud High School. These former grant-maintained and foundation schools became academies in 2011. Both schools can trace their history back to the founding of Marling School in 1889 and Stroud High School which was founded in 1904 as the Girls' Endowed School. They continued to be grammar schools long after the comprehensive school became the norm in secondary education, and their future was the subject of long-running controversy. The two schools previously shared a mixed sixth form, called the Downfield Sixth Form, which worked in a three-way consortium with Archway Sixth Form and South Gloucestershire and Stroud College.

Other secondary schools include Maidenhill School in Stonehouse, Thomas Keble School in Eastcombe, and the private Wycliffe College in Stonehouse.

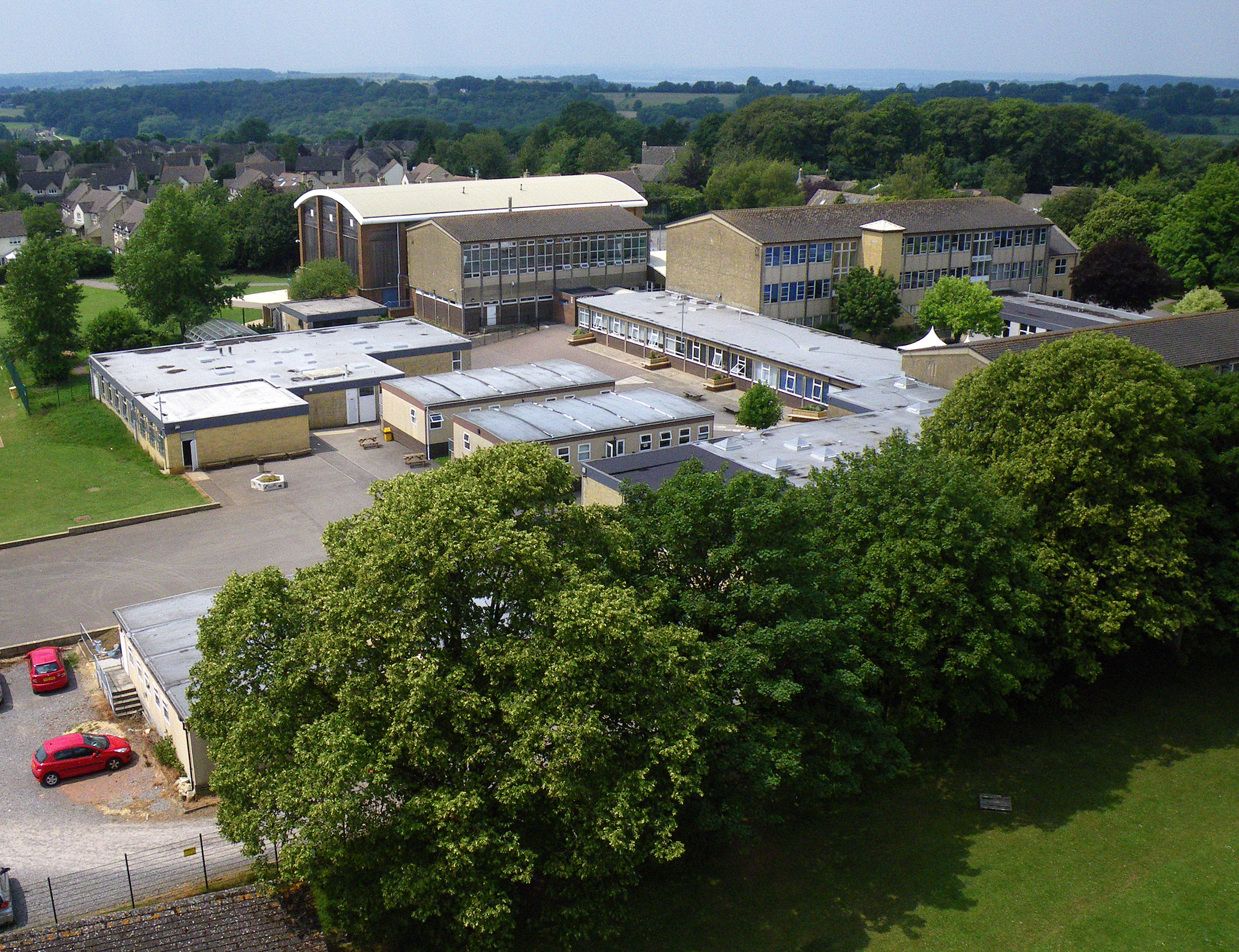
Kite aerial photo of Thomas Keble School

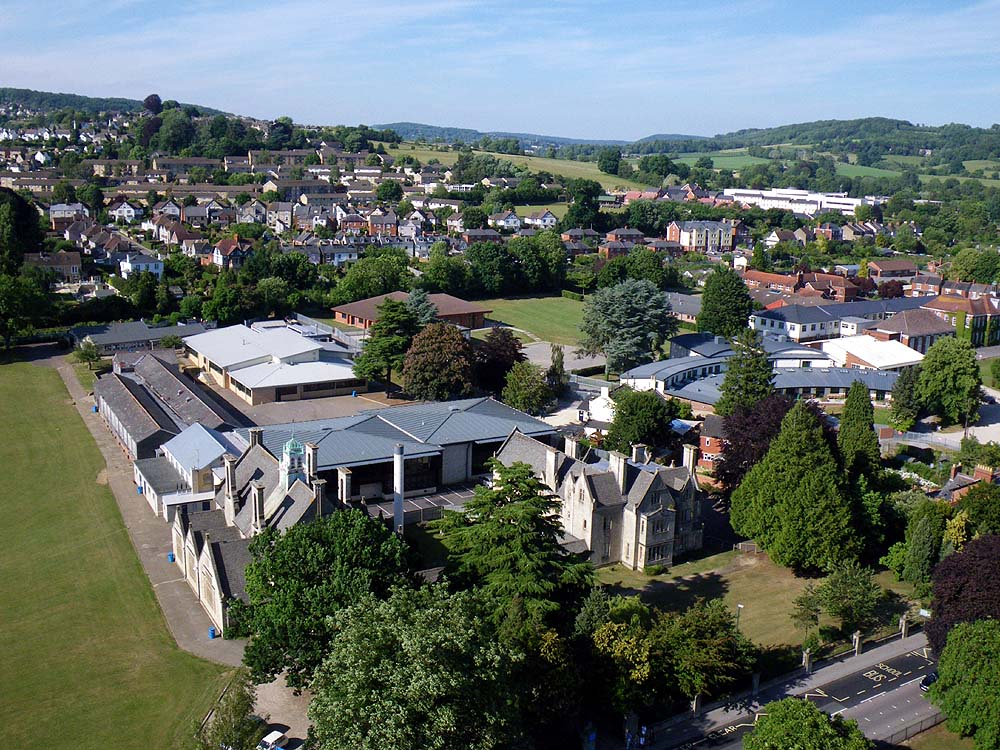
Kite aerial photo of Marling School June 2010

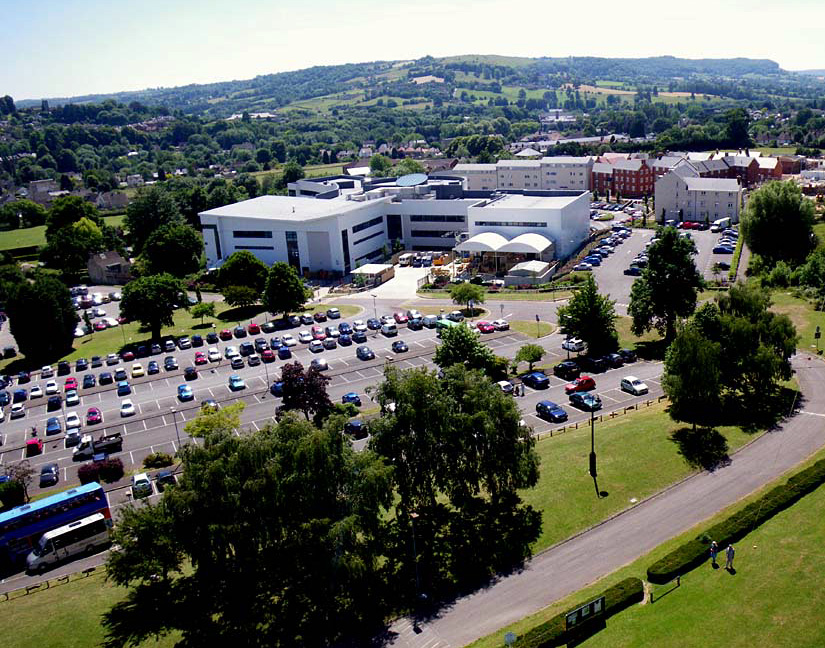
Kite aerial photo of South Gloucestershire and Stroud College

== Transport ==
Stroud railway station on the Great Western Railway was established in 1845.

Stroud was connected to the canal system when the Stroudwater Navigation opened in 1779. The canal closed in 1954.

== Culture ==
Stroud is home to the Bardic Chair of Hawkwood, an annual competition held at Hawkwood College in May to select that year's Bard who then has the responsibility to promote the bardic arts in the Stroud area. The folk-rock music group The Outcast Band come from Stroud, and also regularly headline the Stroud Fringe Festival.

== Sport ==
The Stroud and District Football League is a local football competition for clubs in the area.

== Politics and media ==
Labour's Simon Opher unseated Conservative Siobhan Baillie as the Member of Parliament (MP) for Stroud at the 2024 general election. Baillie had been MP since 2019, having beaten the ex-Labour MP, David Drew, at the previous general election. Drew had previously represented the constituency from 1997 until 2010, when Conservative Neil Carmichael was elected, and from 2017 to 2019.

At local level, Stroud is administered by Stroud District Council, which is run as a Green minority administration, and by Gloucestershire County Council. In the 2025 local elections Stroud sent 6 Green, 2 Reform, 1 Labour, 1 Conservative and 1 Liberal Democrat councillors to Shire Hall.

In March 2008 a community radio station, Stroud FM, was launched, broadcasting 24 hours a day on 107.9FM. It closed in February 2014.

Local newspapers include the weekly Gloucester Citizen, remained Stroud Citizen to replace Stroud Life, published by Gloucestershire Media (part of the Northcliffe Group); the Stroud News & Journal, published by Newsquest Media (Southern) Limited, part of the American Gannett Company and Stroud Times a hyper-local independent publication that launched online in March 2021 and in print the following year.

Stroud Life launched in 2008 and closed in October 2017. Most of its distribution was free direct to homes, and a significant share (about one-third) was sold through the news trade.

Stroud Times was launched as an online-only venture in 2021 by former workers at The Stroud News and Journal.

== Recognition ==
In a March 2021 guide, The Sunday Times named Stroud the best place to live in the UK. The newspaper praised the town's green spaces and independent spirit, as well as the quality of Stroud's schools.

== Notable people ==
=== Activists ===
- Polly Higgins, barrister, author, and environmental lobbyist, lived near Stroud for the last few years of her life
- Gail Bradbrook, co-founder of Extinction Rebellion, lives in Stroud

=== Actors ===
- Teddie Allen, actress, born in Stroud
- Arabella Holzbog, actress, born in Stroud
- Geoffrey Hutchings, actor, lived in Stroud
- Tim McInnerny, actor, attended Marling School
- Sophie Ward, actress, lived in France Lynch

=== Artists ===
- Leo Baxendale, creator of Minnie the Minx, lived nearby
- Lynn Chadwick, sculptor
- Damien Hirst, artist, has a studio in Chalford and another in Stroud
- Mary Morton, sculptor
- Tim Noble, artist
- Jack Russell, former Gloucestershire and England cricketer, now artist, attended Archway School
- Alan Thornhill, sculptor

=== Authors ===
- Rev. W. Awdry, creator of Thomas the Tank Engine, moved to the area
- Katie Fforde, author, moved to the area
- Matthew Fort, food writer, critic, and Guardian food columnist
- Jamila Gavin, children's author, moved to Stroud
- Alan Hollinghurst, author, born in Stroud

=== Engineering and manufacturing ===
- Edwin Beard Budding (1795–1846), inventor of the lawnmower and adjustable spanner, born and died in Stroud
- Arnold Redler (1875–1958), founder of the conveying company Redler Limited in Stroud in 1920 and inventor of the en-masse conveyor
- Lyndon Smith (born 1964), academic, born in Stroud

=== Historians ===
- Peter Hennessy, historian of government, attended Marling School

=== Musicians ===
- Milk Teeth, grunge rock band formed at South Gloucestershire and Stroud College
- Emily Barker, singer, songwriter, lives in Stroud
- Geoffrey Burgon, composer
- Eamon Hamilton, frontman of Brakes and former keyboard player of British Sea Power, raised in Stroud
- Pendragon, neo-progressive rock band
- Josh Record, singer/songwriter
- Sade, singer, songwriter of the band Sade, moved to Slad, near Stroud in 2010
- Tom Smith, lead singer of Editors, grew up in Stroud
- Sarana VerLin, Detroit singer-songwriter, violinist, and organizer of Stroud Americana Festival, moved to Stroud

=== Scientists ===
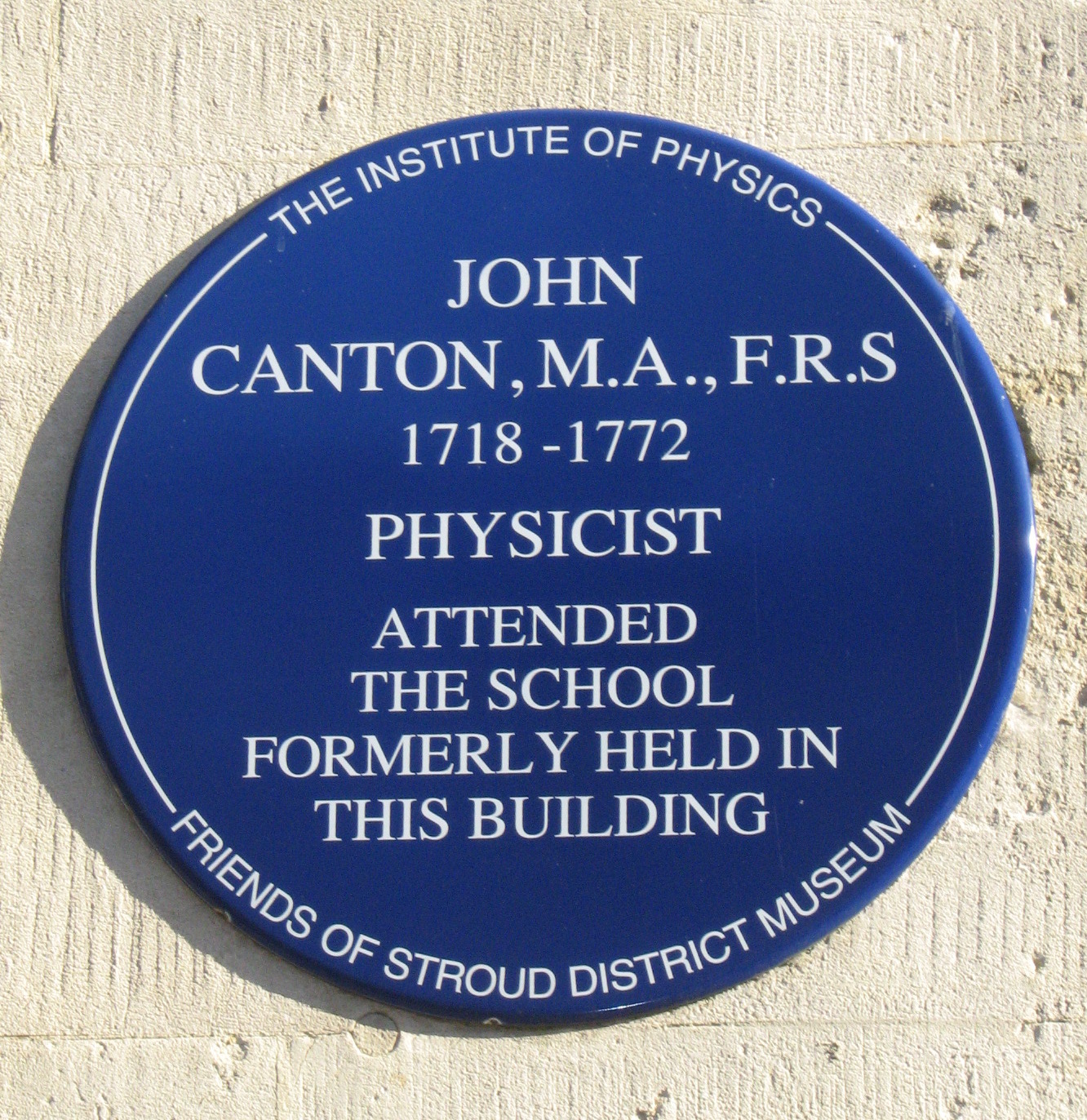
Plaque to John Canton on the Old Town Hall in the Shambles

- John Canton (1718–1772), physicist
- Sir Martin Evans, Nobel Prize in Physiology or Medicine, born in Stroud
- Henry Miles (1698–1763), dissenting minister and writer on science, born and educated in Stroud

=== Sportsmen and women ===
- Dominic Dale, snooker player
- Eddie "The Eagle" Edwards, ski jumper, lives in nearby Woodchester
- Alastair Hignell, sportsman and commentator
- Frank Keating, sports journalist at The Guardian
- Jackie Lewis, racing driver
- Stuart Nelson, footballer, Notts County
- Emily Pidgeon, athlete

== Twin towns ==
Stroud is twinned with:

- Saint-Ismier, Isère, France
- Stroud, Oklahoma, US
- Duderstadt, Lower Saxony, Germany
- Stroud, New South Wales, Australia
