= Bisley-with-Lypiatt =

- Civil parish
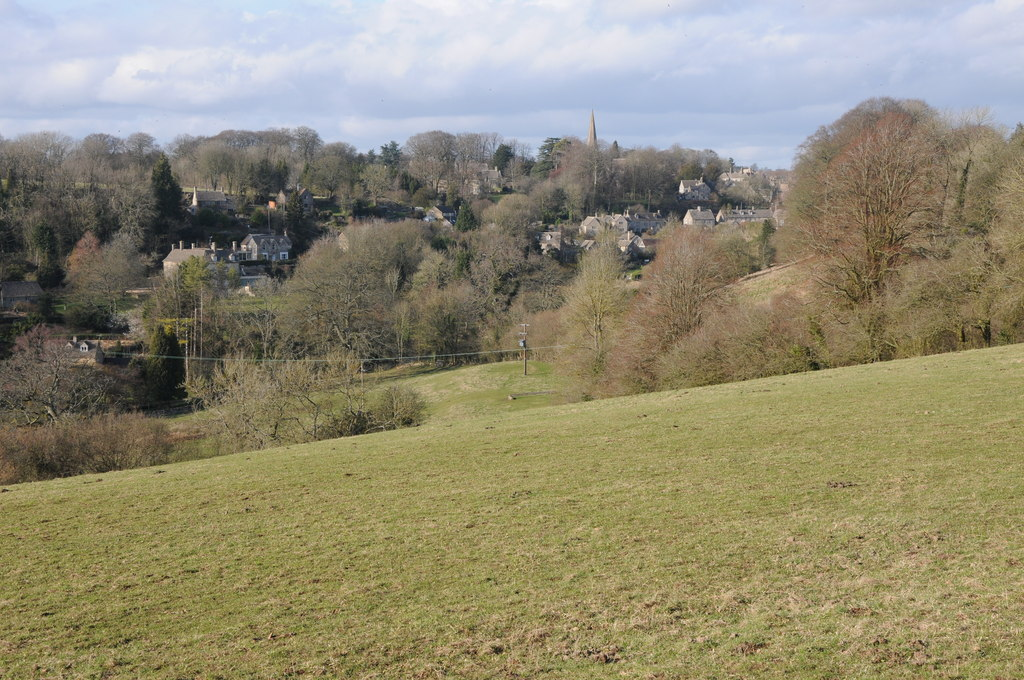
- Bisley viewed from the south
- Interactive map of Bisley-with-Lypiatt
- Coordinates: 51°45′N 2°9′W
- Country: England
- Primary council: Stroud
- County: Gloucestershire
- Region: South West England
- Status: Parish
- Main settlements: Bisley, Eastcombe, Oakridge

Government
  - Type: Parish Council
  - UK Parliament: Stroud

Population (2001)
  - Total: 2,107
- Website: Bisley-with-Lypiatt Parish Council

Bisley-with-Lypiatt is a civil parish in the Stroud district of Gloucestershire, England. It had a population of 2350 in 2019. It includes Bisley, Lypiatt, Eastcombe and Oakridge.

Parishes adjoining Bisley-with-Lypiatt are: Miserden to the north; Edgeworth to the north-east; Duntisbourne Rouse to the east; Sapperton to the south-east; Chalford to the south; Thrupp to the south-west; Stroud to the west; and Painswick to the north-west. Of these, Edgeworth, Duntisbourne Rouse and Sapperton are in the Cotswold district, the remainder in Stroud.
