= Bussage =

Village in Gloucestershire, England

Coordinates: 51.72°N 02.17°W

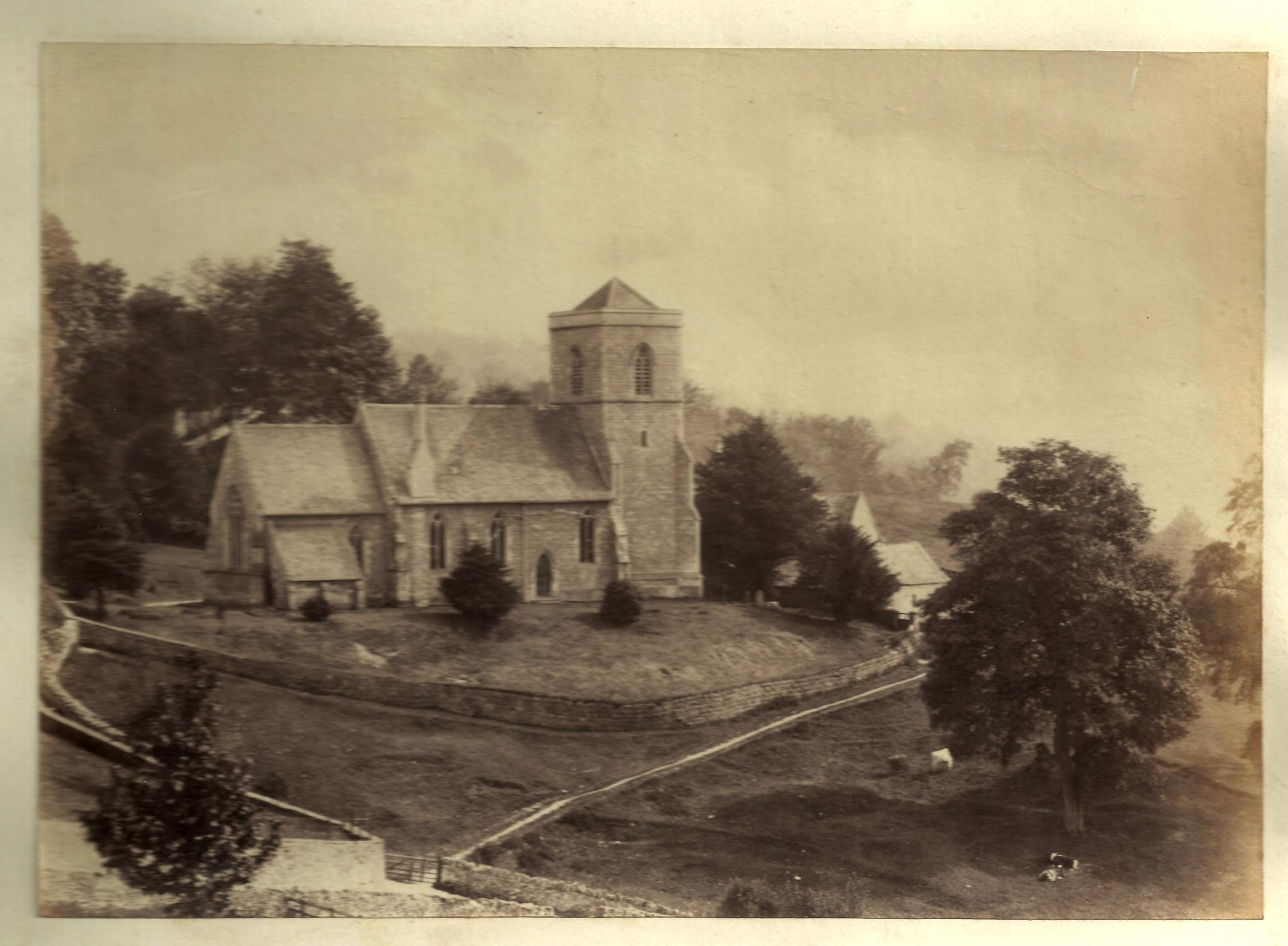
- The church of St Michael and All Angels

- Location within Gloucestershire
- OS grid reference: SO8803
- District: Stroud
- Shire county: Gloucestershire
- Region: South West
- Country: England
- Sovereign state: United Kingdom
- Post town: STROUD
- Postcode district: GL6
- Dialling code: 01453
- Police: Gloucestershire
- Fire: Gloucestershire
- Ambulance: South Western
- UK Parliament: Stroud

Bussage is a village in Gloucestershire, England, in the district of Stroud.

== Geography ==
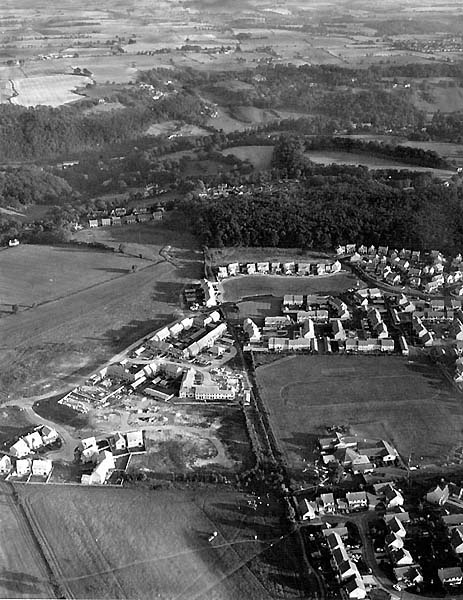
Helicopter outing over the village of Bussage looking towards Frithwood from the north, c. 1991

There is an older part to the village and a newer part. The village is situated close to the A419, between Brimscombe, Eastcombe and Chalford Hill, and near the River Frome.

The newer part of Bussage is a complex estate of houses that used to be known as the Manor Farm Estate, after the original farm of the same name. The original farmhouse is still inhabited and can be found in the estate. This estate was constructed by a number of builders, the primary being Robert Hitchens Ltd.

Not all of the estate is in the parish of Bussage, the most northerly section is in the parish of Bisley-with-Lypiatt.

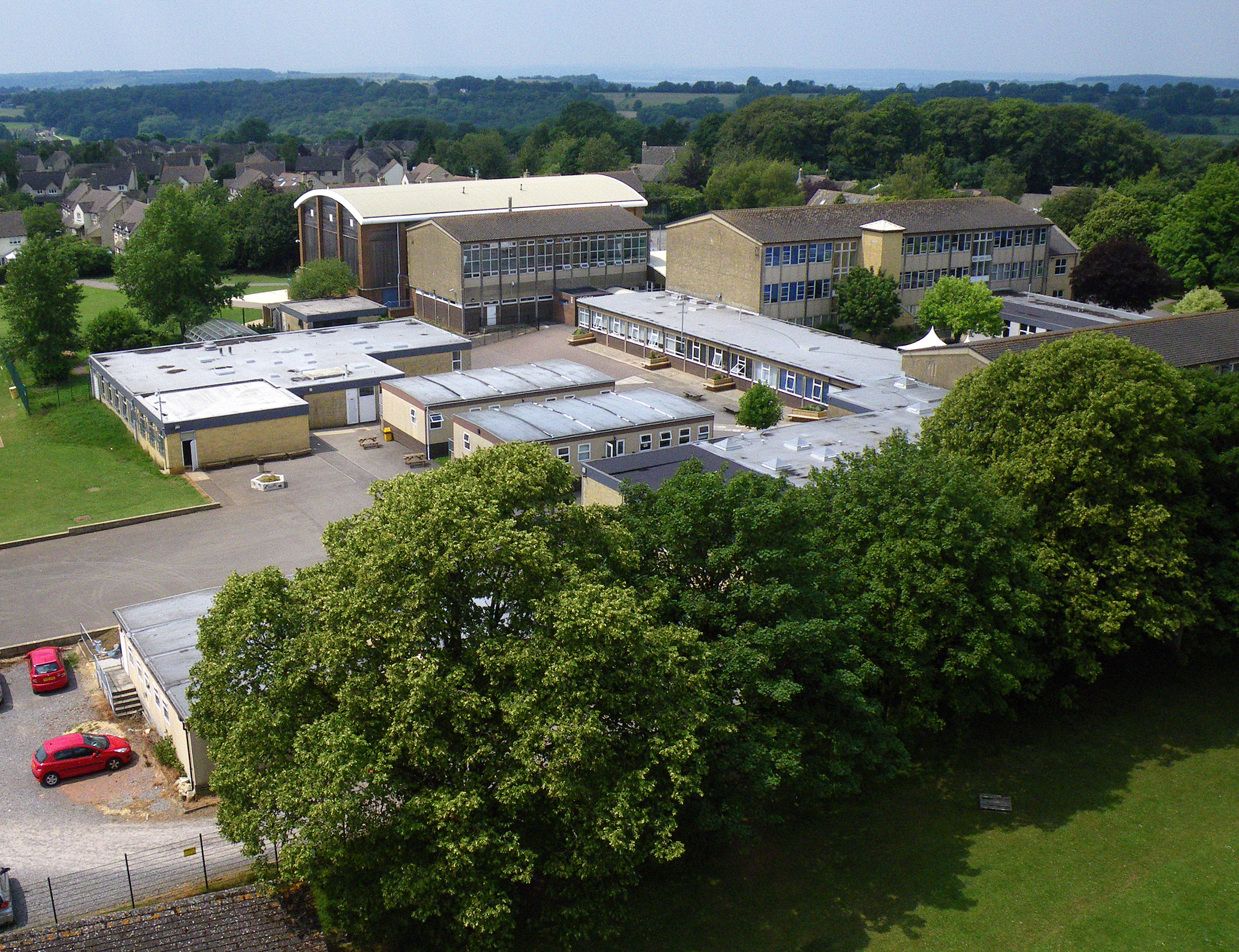
Kite aerial photo of Thomas Keble School

The parish church of Bussage is dedicated to St Michael & All Angels. This church was founded by Thomas Keble (after whom the local secondary school was renamed) and was consecrated in October 1846.

The village pub is the Ram Inn situated on The Ridge. Bussage has its own Church of England primary school. Other primary schools nearby include Eastcombe and Chalford Hill. Thomas Keble School at Eastcombe was known as Manor School until September 1990.

There is also a small shopping centre which consists of a Tesco Express, a Boots pharmacy, Chinese takeaway and a doctor's surgery. Opposite the shopping centre there is a community centre, and a house that was formerly the local police station.

To the south of the Manor Farm Estate is a small woodland, known as Frithwood. This wood, owned by Robert Hitchens Ltd., was subject to an attempt to be registered as a Town or Village Green in 2005. This was rejected by Gloucestershire Council in September of that year.

Frithwood mentioned above is not to be confused with the Frith Wood Nature Reserve, located just outside Painswick in Gloucestershire. Frithwood was put under a Tree Preservation Order in 2013.
