= Eastcombe (disambiguation) =

Eastcombe is a village in Gloucestershire, England.

Eastcombe may also refer to:

- Eastcombe, Mendip, Somerset, England
- Eastcombe, Taunton Deane, Somerset, England
