= Edwin Beard Budding =

English engineer (1796-1846)

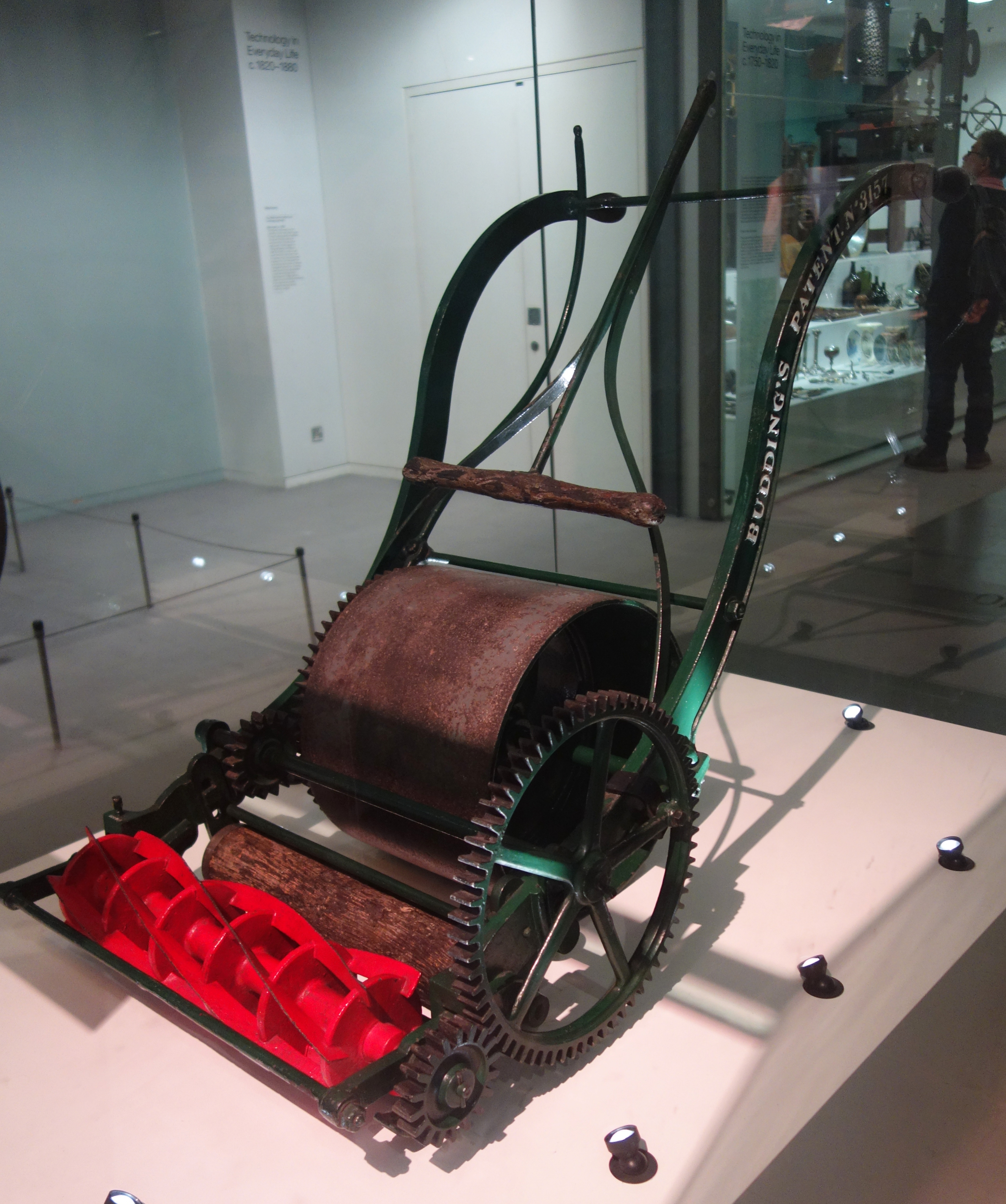
- Lawn mower invented by Edwin Budding, manufactured by John Ferrabee & Sons of Stroud, sold by their agents for the eastern counties of England; Ransomes & May of Ipswich.
- Born: Edwin Beard Budding; 25 August 1796; Eastington, Gloucestershire, England
- Died: 25 September 1846 (aged 50); Dursley, Gloucestershire, England
- Occupations: Engineer; inventor
- Known for: Inventing the lawnmower; Inventing the adjustable spanner

Edwin Beard Budding (25 August 1796 – 25 September 1846), an engineer born in Eastington, Stroud, Gloucestershire, was the English inventor of the lawnmower (1830) and adjustable spanner (1842).

== Lawnmower ==
Budding had the idea of the lawnmower after seeing a machine in a local cloth mill that used a cutting cylinder (or bladed reel) mounted on a bench to trim the irregular nap from the surface of woolen cloth and give a smooth finish. Budding realized that a similar device could be used to cut grass if the mechanism was mounted in a wheeled frame to make the blades rotate close to the lawn's surface. His mower was designed primarily to cut the lawn on sports grounds and extensive gardens, as a superior alternative to the scythe, and was granted a British patent on 31 August 1830. It took ten more years and further innovations to create a machine that could be worked by animals, and sixty years before a steam-powered lawn mower was built.

The first machine produced was 19 inches in width with a frame made of wrought iron. The mower was pushed from behind with motive power coming from the rear land roller which drove gears to transfer the drive to the knives on the cutting cylinder; the ratio was 16:1. There was another roller placed in between the cutting cylinder and the land roller which was adjustable to alter the height of cut. On cutting, the grass clippings were hurled forward into a tray-like box. It was soon realized, however, that an extra handle was needed in front of the machine which could be used to help pull it along. Two of the earliest Budding machines sold went to Regent's Park Zoological Gardens in London and the Oxford Colleges.

In an agreement between John Ferrabee and Edwin Budding, dated 18 May 1830, Ferrabee paid the costs of development, obtained letters of patent and acquired rights to manufacture, sell and license other manufacturers in the production of lawn mowers. Together they made mowers in a factory at Thrupp near Stroud.

Examples of the early Budding type mowers can be seen in Stroud Museum, the London Science Museum and at Milton Keynes Museum.

== Adjustable spanner ==
Budding is also credited with the invention of the screw adjustable spanner (adjustable crescent wrench) in 1842.

== Firearms ==
Budding's engineering and manufacturing skills also extended to the production of a five-shot percussion revolver having brass manually-rotated barrels in about 1830.
