= Thomas Keble =

Thomas Keble (25 October 1793, in Fairford – 5 September 1875) was a Church of England clergyman, younger brother of John Keble. Keble was Vicar of Bisley, Gloucestershire from 1827 to 1873. He contributed four of the Tracts for the Times, three of them under a pseudonym also used by his brother, Richard Nelson.

== Life ==
Keble was born on 25 October 1793 at Fairford, Gloucestershire, where his father, John Keble, was vicar of Coln St Aldwyns. He and his elder brother, John Keble, were educated at home by their father until each went to Oxford. At the same early age (fourteen), he was elected a Gloucestershire scholar of Corpus Christi College, Oxford, on 31 March 1808. In 1811 he graduated B.A., having gained a second class in classics and a third class (then called a second below the line) in mathematics. He was ordained as a deacon in December 1816, and priest in 1817. From the beginning of 1817 to the end of 1818 he had the parochial charge of Windrush and Sherborne, Gloucestershire.

In the autumn of 1819 he became college tutor at Corpus. At the time he headed the list of scholars, and, according to a. contemporary at Corpus, accepted the post reluctantly, after several previous refusals (Life of Phelps). In 1820 he became probationary fellow, and while residing at Oxford as tutor shared with his brother the curacies of East Leach and Burthrop until 1824, when he became curate of Cirencester. In 1825 be married Elizabeth Jane Clarke, daughter of a former fellow of Corpus, afterwards rector of Meyseyhampton.

In 1827 he was instituted to the living of Bisley, Gloucestershire, then a scattered parish with a number of outlying hamlets with a poor and neglected population. He persevered, in spite of many discouragements, in improving the bodily and spiritual condition of the people, and there are now three consecrated churches with districts assigned to them taken out of the old parish, besides a consecrated chapel of ease with a conventional district. He founded the parish church of Bussage, dedicated to St Michael & All Angels and consecrated in 1846. His whole thoughts were absorbed in his parish. He was one of the first in England to revive the daily service in church, both morning and evening— a feature in his parish work which is made the subject of a beautiful poem by his friend Isaac Williams. The example set at Bisley was followed, through Isaac Williams, at St Mary's, Oxford, and Littlemore, and thence spread through England. As Keble's health was weak, his parish work left him little time for literary labours; but he was highly valued by many friends, and his judgment on spiritual questions was always received with deference by his elder brother. He died on 5 September 1875, and was succeeded as vicar of Bisley by his son (also Thomas Keble).

Thomas Keble wrote four of the 'Tracts for the Times', viz. Nos. 12, 22, 43 and 84. The first three belong to the 'Richard Nelson' series, which was afterwards published in a separate form. He also wrote forty-eight of the 'Plain Sermons'; the publication of which in connection with the 'Tracts' was probably first suggested by him. His own contributions are those marked E in vol.x. He translated the Homilies of St John Chrysostom on the Epistle to the Hebrews for the Library of the Fathers, the translation being revised by John Barrow. He published a short tract, Considerations on the Athanasian Creed, in 1872, and a preface to Short Sketches of the Fathers of the English Church, by Francis Philip.

== Works ==
- (as Richard Nelson) No. 1 Bishops, Priests, and Deacons, Tracts for the Times No. 12, 1833.
- (as Richard Nelson), No. II. The Athanasian Creed, Tracts for the Times No. 22
- (as Richard Nelson) No. IV. Length of the Public Service, Tracts for the Times No. 43
- Whether a Clergyman of the Church of England be now bound to have Morning and Evening Prayers daily in his Parish Church, Tracts for the Times No. 84
- Plain sermons, 1839

== See also ==
- Thomas Keble School
