= Oakridge, Stroud =

Village in Gloucestershire, England

Coordinates: 51.73°N 02.12°W

Oakridge
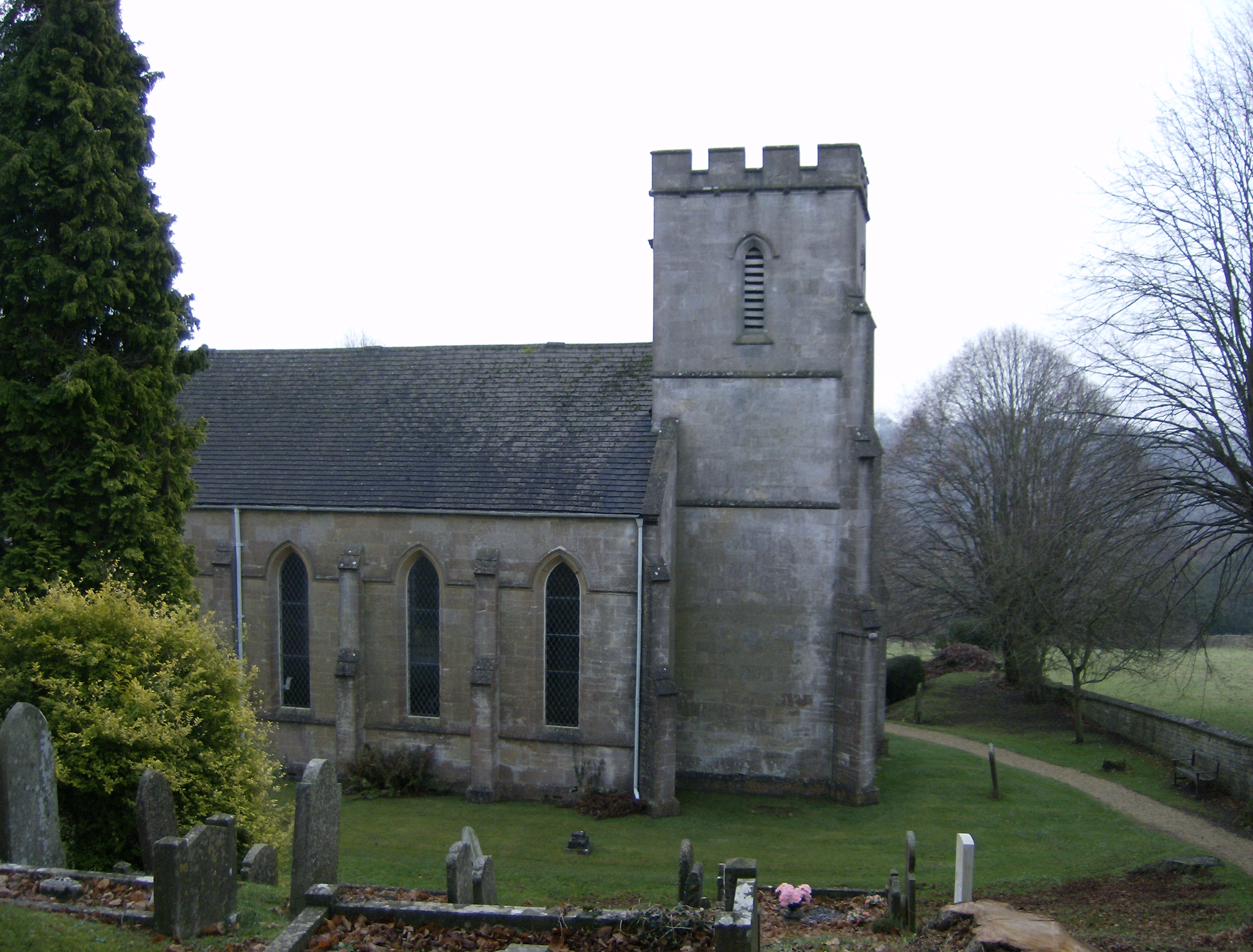
- St. Bartholomew's Church, Oakridge

- Location within Gloucestershire
- OS grid reference: SO9103
- Civil parish: Bisley-with-Lypiatt
- District: Stroud
- Shire county: Gloucestershire
- Region: South West
- Country: England
- Sovereign state: United Kingdom
- Police: Gloucestershire
- Fire: Gloucestershire
- Ambulance: South Western

Oakridge is a village in the civil parish of Bisley-with-Lypiatt, in the Stroud district, in the county of Gloucestershire, England. The parish church is St. Bartholomew's Church. It is just on the outskirts of Stroud.

Oakridge consists of five hamlets; Oakridge Lynch, Far Oakridge, Waterlane, Bournes Green, and Tunley. Within Oakridge Lynch can be found the parish church of St. Bartholomew's, the nearby Oakridge Parochial School primary, the village Shop and Post Office, The Butchers Arms pub, and the Village Hall. The Butchers Arms is an 18th-century building with stone walls and oak beamed ceilings.

The Annual Oakridge Village Show is held on the first Saturday in September at the local recreation ground.

== Notable people ==
Charles Mason, one of the surveyors of America's Mason–Dixon line, (the other being Jeremiah Dixon), was born in Oakridge Lynch in 1728. The architect Alfred Hoare Powell bought and restored Gurners Farm in Oakridge Lynch around 1902. Gurners Farm was rented from Alfred Powell by the writer and drama producer Mabel Dearmer for some months in 1914. From 1913 to 1920 Sir William Rothenstein, artist and some time Principal of the Royal College of Art, lived at Iles Farm in Far Oakridge, which he restored and furnished with the help of members of the Arts and Crafts movement based at Sapperton. Notable persons who visited Rothenstein in Oakridge included Rabindranath Tagore, W. B. Yeats, A. E. Housman, Augustus John. John Drinkwater and André Gide. Max Beerbohm spent the years of the Great War at Winston Cottage as William Rothenstein's guest. Dame Margaret Weston, director of the Science Museum, grew up in the village and also lived there in retirement.
