= Brimscombe and Thrupp =

Civil parish in Stroud, Gloucestershire, England

Coordinates: 51.727°N 2.201°W

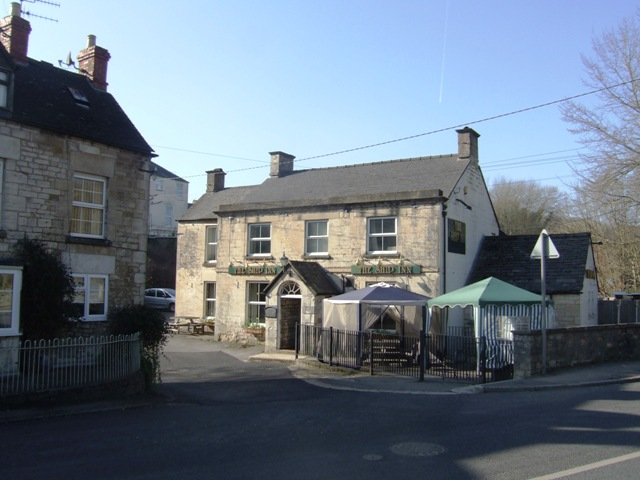

- Location within Gloucestershire
- Population: 1,830 (2011 census)
- Civil parish: Brimscombe and Thrupp
- District: Stroud
- Shire county: Gloucestershire
- Region: South West
- Country: England
- Sovereign state: United Kingdom
- Police: Gloucestershire
- Fire: Gloucestershire
- Ambulance: South Western

Brimscombe and Thrupp (grid reference SO862032) is a civil parish made up of the villages of Thrupp and Brimscombe, in the narrow Frome Valley slightly south-east of Stroud, Gloucestershire, England. The parish also includes the hamlets of Quarhouse and The Heavens. The population taken at the 2011 census was 1,830.

== History ==
=== The mills ===
Although small-scale textile weaving and cloth manufacturing had been taking place for centuries it was with the construction of the Thames and Severn Canal and Brimscombe Port in 1789 that the two villages expanded rapidly, and many cloth and woollen mills were constructed. Many of these were later adapted for other purposes.

Bourne Mills at one time housed a company that produced walking sticks. Griffin Mill was founded in 1600 by the Griffin family for the making of cloth and was subsequently used for furniture making. Ham Mill produced textiles from 1601 to 2000, when the carpet manufacturer occupying the premises ceased trading. Phoenix Mill was the site of the old iron works (see Phoenix Iron Works below). Port Mills was at one time a grist mill before later becoming a textile mill (until the 1930s); then, in the late 1930s and 1940s, it housed a garden tractor company and an engineering works (see under Brimscombe Port below).

=== Phoenix Iron Works ===
Early records indicate that there was a cloth mill at Thrupp dating back as far as 1381. By 1770 the premises had expanded to include a house, four fulling mills and a gig mill.

The gig mill, which eventually became known as Thrupp Mill, was leased to Edward Ferrabee in 1793. By 1828 the entire premises were leased to the Ferrabees, and an iron works, the Phoenix Iron Works, had been established. The Ferrabees became well known for their production of cloth-making machines, steam engines, agricultural machinery and water wheels. It was here that John Lewis had invented a machine in 1815 to shear the surplus fibres or nap from the surface of cloth, using a horizontal blade.

In the 1820s Edwin Beard Budding, a machinist or "mechanician", was employed by Edward's son, John, at Thrupp. It was while Budding was working at Thrupp that Lewis' machine was developed to use rotary cutters, and Budding realised that this machine could be adapted for other purposes. Using gears, a revolving horizontal shaft and three blades he developed a machine to cut grass, which until then had been cut manually, using a scythe. This resulted in the world's first lawn mower being invented at Thrupp. It received its patent in 1830. Budding is also credited with the invention of the screw adjustable spanner.

=== Brimscombe Port ===
Brimscombe was an important local centre during the Industrial Revolution with its canal and rail links, with Brimscombe Port serving as the hub of the Thames and Severn Canal.

Brimscombe Port was originally built to transfer cargo from Severn trows, which travelled from the River Severn onto the Stroudwater Navigation, onto smaller vessels bound for London via the Thames and Severn Canal and the River Thames. This was necessary because the locks to the east of the port were too narrow to accommodate the larger sea-going trows. There were also several boat-building yards at the port, including Abdela & Mitchell, who exported boats, notably paddle steamers, all over the world.

Until the construction of what is now the A419 road along the bottom of the valley in 1815, Thrupp Lane was the main thoroughfare between Stroud and Chalford. The condition of this road was such that it required a whole day for a team of horses to draw a loaded waggon and return, a distance of only four miles each way. Later, the coming of the railway transformed the valley into a major route eastwards from Stroud (see Brimscombe railway station).

According to one source, the legendary riverboat Queen of Africa, which gave a star performance in the John Huston movie The African Queen, was built at the Abdela & Mitchell Brimscombe works between 1908 and 1911. However, other sources state that the boat, which still exists in the USA, can be identified from the plate on her boiler as being built by Lytham Shipbuilding and Engineering Co. as Livingstone. Naturally many vessels built for export by various companies resembled each other. The distinguishing feature which differentiates African Queen from the Brimscombe boats is the use of a vertical boiler on a vessel larger than vessels built by Abdelas with such boilers. Abdela preferred to use horizontal boilers for vessels of this size.

Many of the Abdela & Mitchell river-boats went to the Nile, the Niger and other African rivers, and especially to the Peruvian Amazon and other Amazonian tributaries. The Abdela river-boats were highly regarded for their elegance, shallow draft (often less than 40 cm), and flexibility, viz the Addis Ababa for Lt-Col John Harrington's White Nile/Ethiopia expedition of 1903 – "boiler arranged to burn oil, coal or wood". The Shipyards announced themselves as "Contractors To The Admiralty, War Office, India Office And Allied Governments".

Port Mills was in use in the mid 1930s by a family called Reed who sold Kincade garden tractors, but the enterprise was loss making and during 1937-8 the business was taken over by Bullock, Parsons & Co, who also worked as engineering contractors. Another businessman, Mr C T R Shepheard, who had been running a nearby sign manufacturing business, joined forces with the company and became a director. However the declaration of war in September 1939 meant the garden tractor business continued to be a struggle, especially because of difficulties obtaining import licences. From 1939 the need was for engineering that supported the war effort, and thus Bullock, Parsons & Co redeployed their plant and staff to do contract work for the Bristol Aeroplane Company, Rolls-Royce (for Spitfire engines) and Humber. Towards the end of the war the premises were commandeered for storage by the Admiralty and were only finally restored to Mr Bullock's company after he had written 364 letters to the government and published his story in the Daily Express (26 October 1945). In the 21st century, Port Mill houses the History Press, which, by happy coincidence, published the memoir cited above with reference to Bullock, Parsons & Co.

== Present day ==
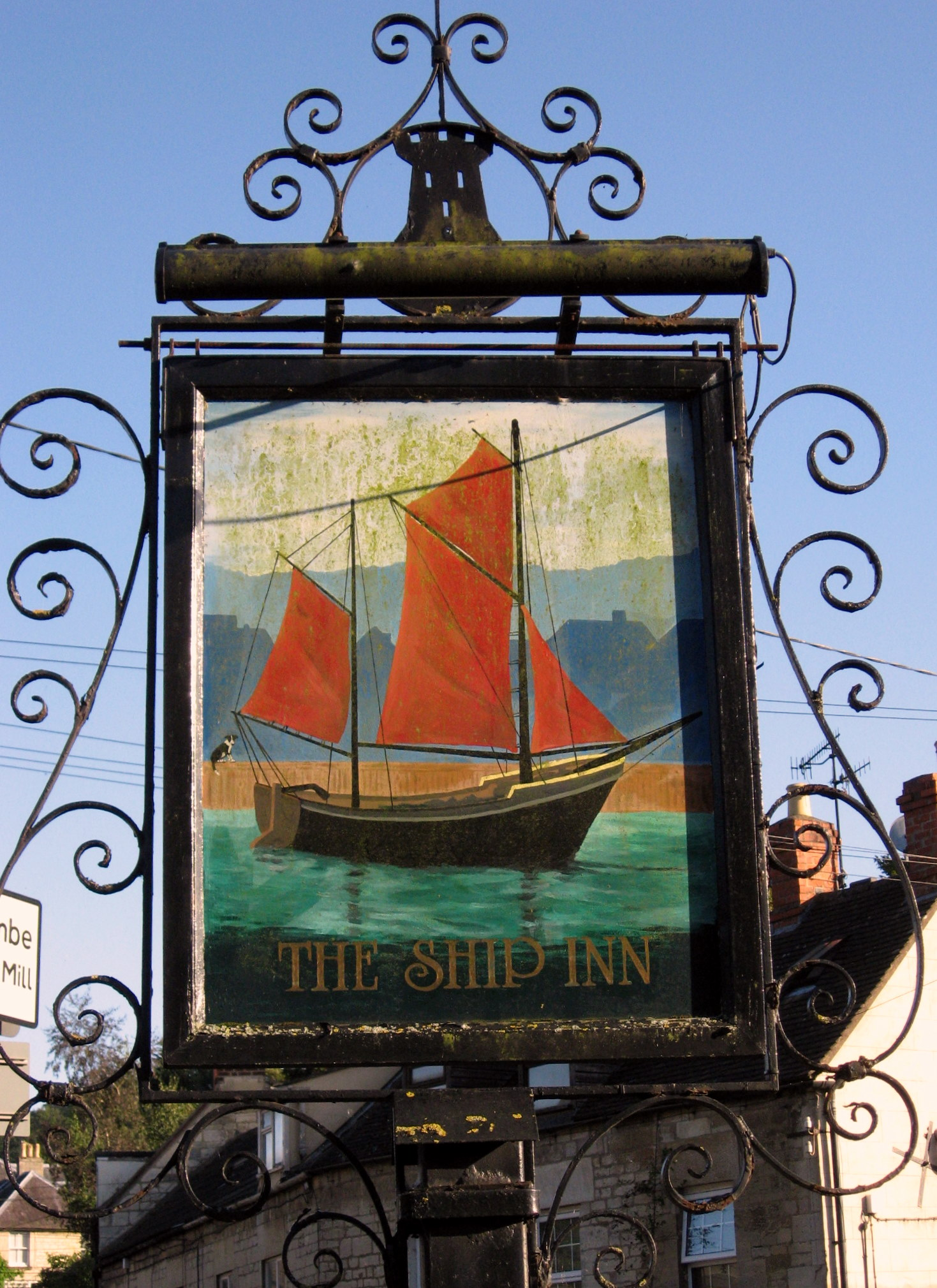
The Ship Inn sign at Brimscombe featuring a Severn Trow

The former port is to be regenerated as part of the canal restoration project by the Cotswold Canals Partnership. This will require considerable engineering expertise as much of the basin has been infilled, and in places factories have been built over the canal. Initially, the canal is planned to become navigable from Brimscombe Port to the Gloucester and Sharpness Canal. Plans are in place, and much activity being undertaken to restore the whole length of what is now known as The Cotswold Canals, eastwards from Brimscombe to Inglesham on the Thames.

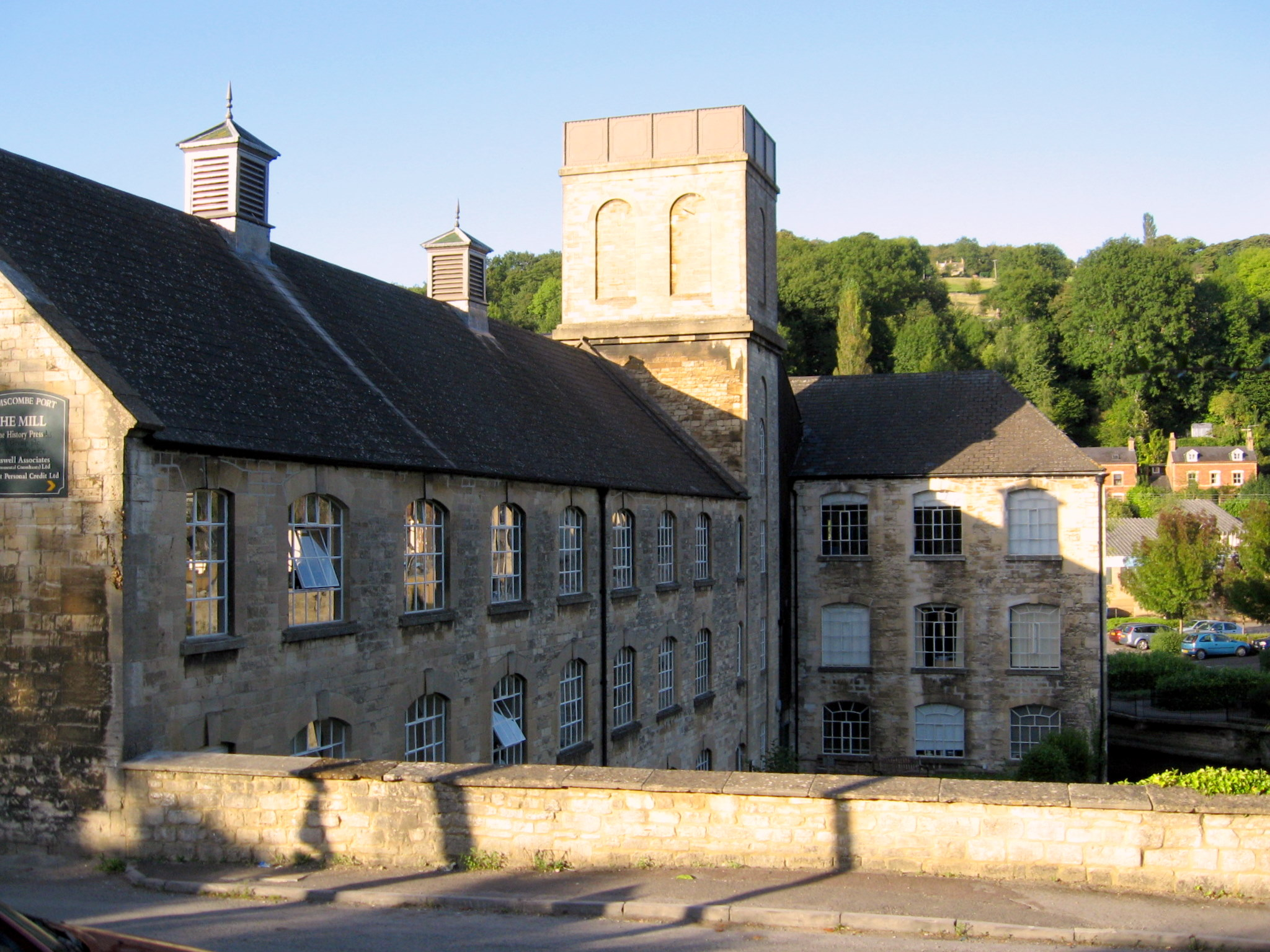
Port Mill, Brimscombe

=== Business ===
Although there are still a handful of shops in Brimscombe including the newsagent, post office, fish & chip shop, hairdresser and antique furniture store, the number of retail outlets has been in steady decline. The last shop and post office in Thrupp, the Happy Shopper, closed in 1998.

However, most of the former mill buildings have been restored and converted for modern business use. Bourne Mills now houses a cycle shop, auto repair services, and a metal polishing company. Griffin Mill is occupied by a variety of small businesses including a paint factory, a painting and decorating retail business, a fitness centre, an antiques emporium, a computer supplier, a printmaking co-operative and an art shop. Hope Mills business centre contains a tree maintenance company, a car body repair centre, a banner maker and an electrical, plumbing and building maintenance contractor. Phoenix Mill is a trading estate containing, among others, a swimming pool installer, a hot sauce manufacturer, an electronic component manufacturer, a brewery, a printers, Noni's Coffee Roasters and Hammett Guitar Co.- an independent guitar manufacturer.

=== Education ===
Thrupp primary school is a mixed school of non-denominational religion with a thriving arts community, while Brimscombe C of E Primary is a mixed school of Church of England religion. Both schools act as feeder schools for Thomas Keble School, Stroud High School, Marling School, Archway School, Cirencester Deer Park School, Sir William Romney, Maidenhill School and St Peter's School in Gloucester.

=== Governance ===
Both villages fall in the 'Thrupp' electoral ward. This ward stretches from Rodborough in the north to Brimscombe in the south. The total ward population at the 2011 census was 2,327.

=== Leisure ===
There is a public house, the name of which reflects the local history, the Ship Inn at Brimscombe, which takes its name from the Severn trows which are mentioned earlier. Until recently there was another pub called the King and Castle. This acquired its name from its proximity to the railway line (it was opposite the site of Brimscombe station); 'King' and 'Castle' being the names of two classes of steam locomotive used by the Great Western Railway. It is now an Indian restaurant.

Burleigh Court Hotel occupies a Grade II listed early 19th century manor house, built for George Harmar (d.1827) and rebuilt in the 1920s by Clough Williams-Ellis, the builder of Portmeirion|.

=== Religion ===
The parish church is dedicated to the Holy Trinity, and there is a Methodist church on Brimscombe Hill, as well as a non-denominational Christian Fellowship that meets in the Brimscombe and Thrupp Social Centre.

=== Sport ===
Brimscombe & Thrupp F.C. (known as the Lilywhites) have a first team who play in the Hellenic League Premier Division and a Development team who play in the Hellenic League Division 2 West. Their home ground is The Meadow, where they have been resident for over a hundred years.

=== Politics ===
Two councillors represent Brimscombe and Thrupp Parish on Stroud District Council.
