= Archway School =

Location
- Paganhill; Stroud, Gloucestershire, GL5 4AX; England; 51°45′03″N 2°14′16″W

Information
- Type: Community school
- Established: 1961
- Local authority: Gloucestershire
- Department for Education URN: 115723 Tables
- Ofsted: Reports
- Headteacher: James Woollin
- Gender: Mixed
- Age: 11 to 18
- Enrolment: 1,170
- Capacity: 1,215
- Website: www.archwayschool.net

Archway School is a comprehensive co-educational school for pupils aged 11 to 18 in Stroud, Gloucestershire, England. The headteacher is James Woollin.

== History ==
Archway Secondary Modern School, Paganhill, Stroud, was built on land compulsorily purchased from EJ Wheeler of Park Farm and from part of the Farmhill Park Estate. The latter was the home in the 1830s of magistrate Henry Wyatt (1793-1847) who built the gate archway (which gives the School its name) as a commemoration of the abolition of slavery.

The school received its first pupils in September 1961 and was one of the first comprehensive schools in the Stroud area. The first headteacher was Mr SGH Loosely. It was officially opened on Friday 30 March 1962 by Walter James, editor of the Times Educational Supplement, with Major PD Birchall, chairman of the County Education Committee, and Margaret Hills, chairman of the school governors.

== Sixth form ==
Archway has its own sixth form, which was part of the Stroud Post-16 Consortium along with Downfield Sixth Form (a collaboration between Marling School, Stroud High School) and South Gloucestershire and Stroud College.

== Sports facilities ==
The school has playing fields, including cricket nets, rugby and football pitches, a full-size running track and tennis courts. It has a 20-metre (66 ft) heated indoor swimming-pool, and in 1997 opened a sports centre including a dance room, gym and large sprung-floor hall.

The sports centre includes the "Jack Russell Lounge," named after former student the England wicket keeper Robert "Jack" Russell.

== Student activities ==
In 2019 to 2022 Archway School students took in the Fridays For Future school strikes in Stroud. Two Archway students were awarded Young People of the Year by Stroud Town Council in 2019.

== Use in film ==
The BBC's The Casual Vacancy was filmed at the school in 2014.

== Notable alumni ==
- Mike Cook, former professional footballer for York City and Cambridge United, and manager of Gloucester City A.F.C.
- Luke Jerram, installation artist - Tide,Glass Microbiology,Maya.
- Dawn King, playwright and screenwriter
- Tamzin Malleson, actress - Dangerfield, Midsomer Murders, Marcella.
- Stuart Nelson, goalkeeper for Brentford, Leyton Orient, Notts County, Gillingham, and Dover Athletic.
- Jack Russell, cricketer - England Wicket-keeper 1987-1998.
- Tom Smith (musician)
