= Maidenhill School =

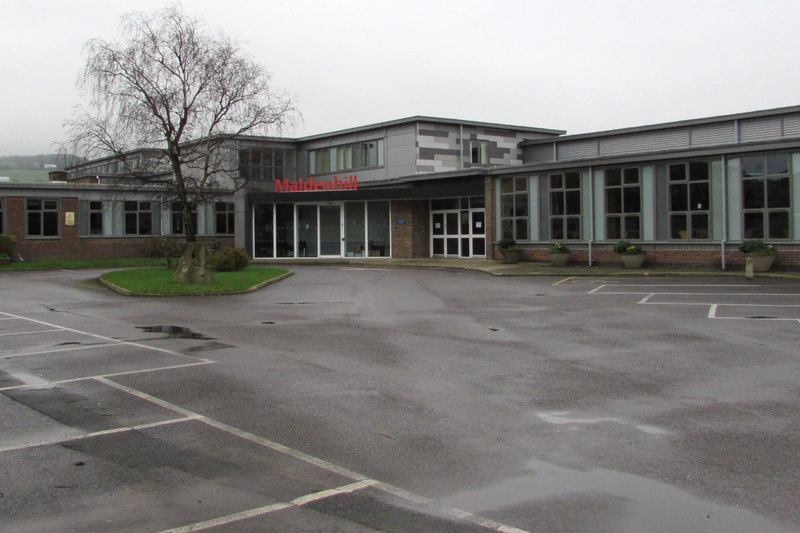

Location
- Kings Road; Stonehouse, Gloucestershire, GL10 2HA; England
- Coordinates: 51.75285°N 2.27966°W

Information
- Type: Foundation school
- Motto: Creating and achieving a brighter future.
- Local authority: Gloucestershire
- Department for Education URN: 115775 Tables
- Ofsted: Reports
- Head Teacher: Andrew Hunter
- Gender: Coeducational
- Age: 11 to 16
- Enrolment: 696 as of January 2023
- Website: https://www.maidenhill.gloucs.sch.uk/

Maidenhill School is a coeducational foundation secondary school located in Stonehouse in the English county of Gloucestershire.

It is a smaller than average secondary school with a rural catchment area. The school has 694 students (as from September 2023). Maidenhill School have a capacity of 785 students. The catchment area includes Eastington, Frocester, Leonard Stanley, Standish and Stonehouse, as well as parts of Cainscross, King's Stanley, Hardwicke and Randwick.

As a foundation school, Maidenhill is administered by Gloucestershire County Council.

== Houses ==
Maidenhill consists of four student houses all named after local hills and are represented by a house colour; Haresfield (yellow), Rodborough (blue), Frocester (red) and Doverow (green). Each house contains about 100 students from a mix of year groups. Two student house leaders from Year 11 are elected to represent each school house every academic year.

== Ofsted Report 2017 ==
Maidenhill School, in 2017, received a 'Good' from Ofsted and was described to work extremely well to support the physical, mental and emotional health of its pupils. The school is said to have improved since the last inspection and it was noted that this was due to the head's "drive and determination" to improve.

Ofsted 2017, "Not all teachers are secure in using the school’s new assessment system to provide reliable information to parents, governors and senior leaders about pupils’ progress. At times, the most able pupils are not challenged to achieve fully in line with their capabilities. This hampers their ability to attain the highest standards."

== Notable current and former staff ==
- David Drew, politician

== Notable former pupils ==
- Alex Rowe, soldier
