= Thomas Keble School =

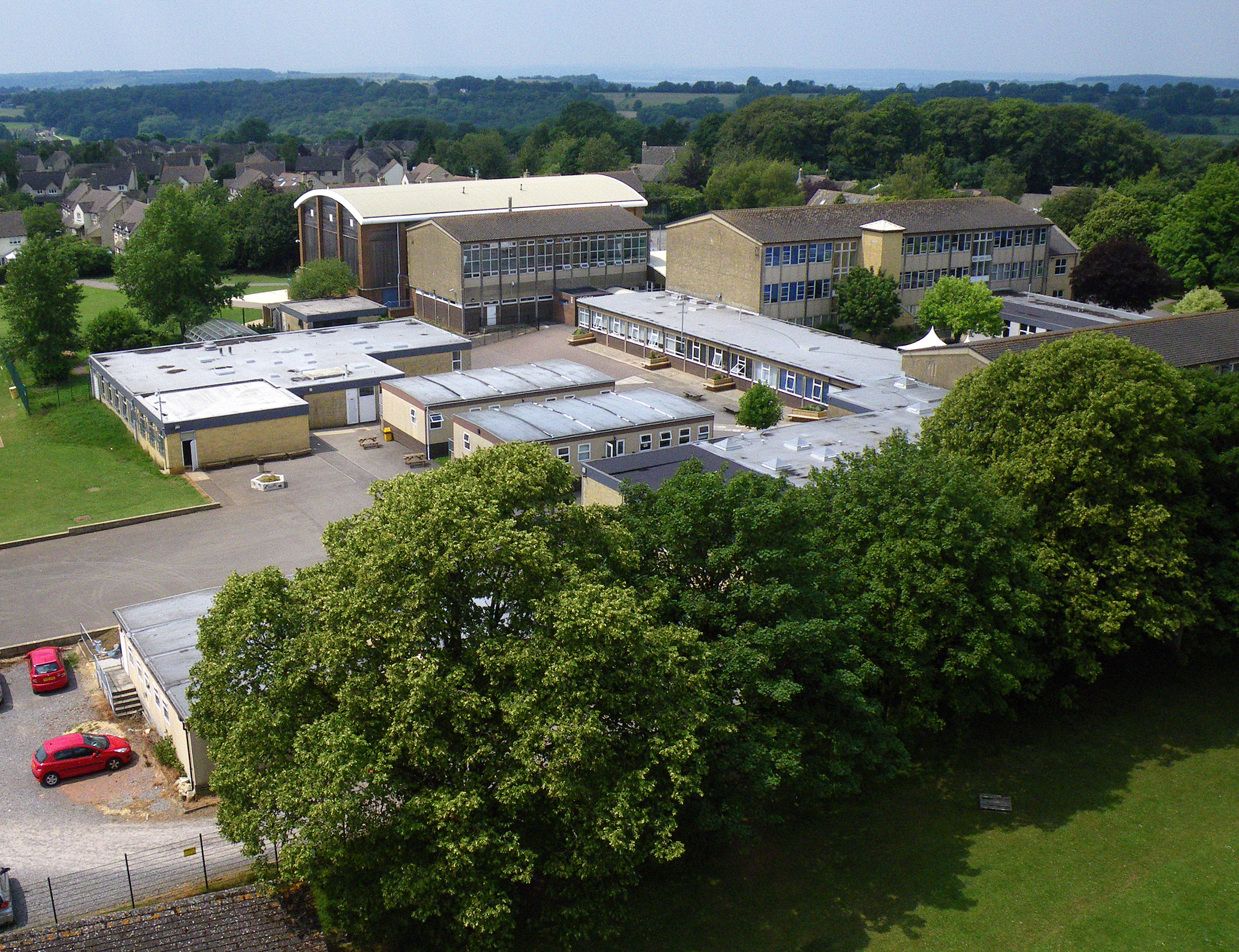

Location
- Eastcombe, Gloucestershire, GL6 7DY; England
- Coordinates: 51.7350°N 2.1594°W

Information
- Type: Academy
- Department for Education URN: 137059 Tables
- Ofsted: Reports
- Headteacher: Steven Shaw
- Gender: Mixed
- Age: 11 to 16
- Enrolment: 681 as of May 2021
- Website: http://www.thomaskeble.gloucs.sch.uk/

Thomas Keble School is a mixed secondary school located in Eastcombe in the English county of Gloucestershire. The school is named after Thomas Keble, a Church of England clergyman who contributed four of the Tracts for the Times. Outside of the main building, there is a memorial tree with a plaque dedicated to the life of Thomas Keble. The plaque reads: "In memory of those who came before us, we honour you." The tree was planted by Julia Abbott on 18 August 1991, the plaque being added later that year.

Known as Manor School until September 1990, Thomas Keble School was previously administered by Gloucestershire County Council, and became a specialist Technology College in September 2002. The school was awarded high performing specialist school status in 2006, enabling a second specialism in sport. Thomas Keble gained foundation school status in 2007 and the school was converted to academy status in August 2011. However the school continues to coordinate with Gloucestershire County Council for admissions.

Thomas Keble School offers GCSEs, BTECs, OCR Nationals and ASDAN courses as programmes of study for pupils.
