= Eastcombe =

Village in Gloucestershire, England

Coordinates: 51.7376°N 2.1596°W

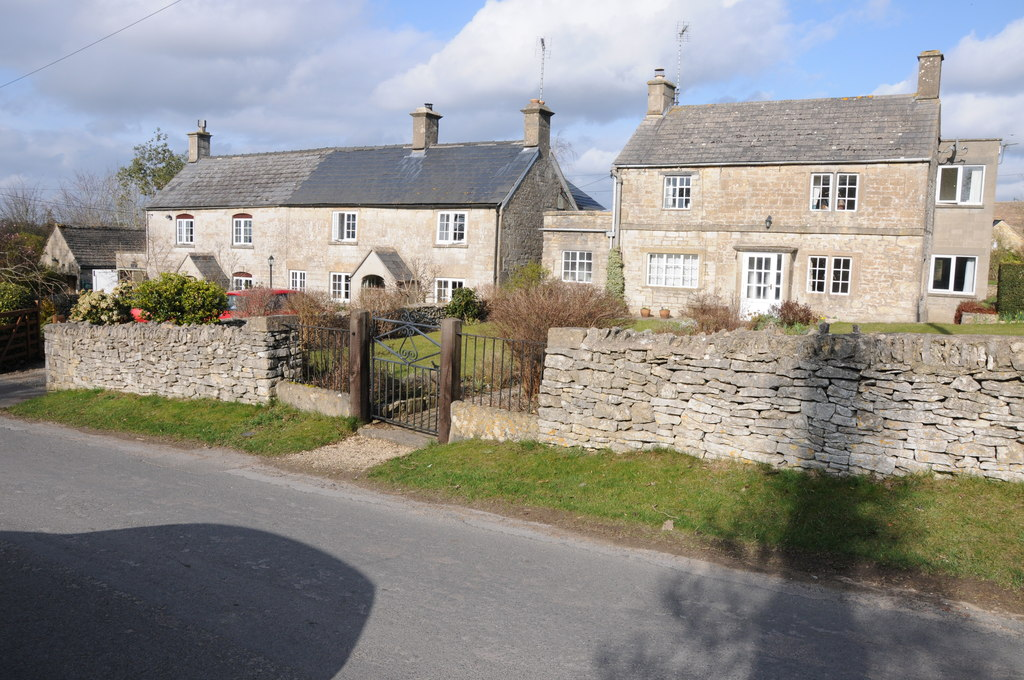
- Cottages in Eastcombe

- Location within Gloucestershire
- Civil parish: Bisley-with-Lypiatt
- District: Stroud
- Shire county: Gloucestershire
- Region: South West
- Country: England
- Sovereign state: United Kingdom
- Post town: Stroud
- Postcode district: GL6
- Police: Gloucestershire
- Fire: Gloucestershire
- Ambulance: South Western
- UK Parliament: Stroud

Eastcombe is a village in the civil parish of Bisley-with-Lypiatt, in the Stroud district, in Gloucestershire, England.

The Parish Church is called Eastcombe: St Augustine and served the parish of Bussage with Eastcombe and the benefice of Bisley, Chalford, France Lynch and Oakridge and Bussage with Eastcombe and belongs to the diocese of Gloucester. It was announced in November 2021 that the church would be closed and the building sold.

Eastcombe is situated in the South West (England) region of the UK and is governed by Stroud District Council.

The village of Eastcombe is in the Gloucestershire region of Gloucestershire, Wiltshire and Bath/Bristol area within South West (England).

Thomas Keble School is a secondary school located in the village.
