= Dudbridge =

Coordinates: 51.74°N 02.24°W

- Location within Gloucestershire
- OS grid reference: SO8305
- Shire county: Gloucestershire
- Region: South West
- Country: England
- Sovereign state: United Kingdom
- Police: Gloucestershire
- Fire: Gloucestershire
- Ambulance: South Western

Dudbridge is a suburb on the southern edge of Stroud in Gloucestershire, England.

== History ==
Dudbridge gains its name from the first bridge in the location, which spanned the River Frome. This made it an important crossing point for traffic heading south from the Cotswolds to the Port of Bristol, which is reflected in that it is the meeting point of four parishes: Stroud in which it lies, plus Rodborough to its east, and Stonehouse and Kings Stanley to its south.

The fast-flowing river made Dudbridge a natural location for early industry, with the earliest record of a mill dating from 1235. Later industries included dying, forging and metalwork.

=== Industry ===
The Redler's industrial estate is the site of the original Dudbridge Mills, located directly beside the River Frome. From the mid-18th century onwards it housed the mills of Daniel Chance, in the mid-18th century, owned three mills: one corn; one gig and a dyehouse with eight drying racks. In 1794, John Apperley's family fused the site for wool and cloth making or the next 140 years. After the business collapsed in 1933, Redler's conveyors manufactured industrial handling equipment on the site until the mid-1990s, when it became an industrial estate.

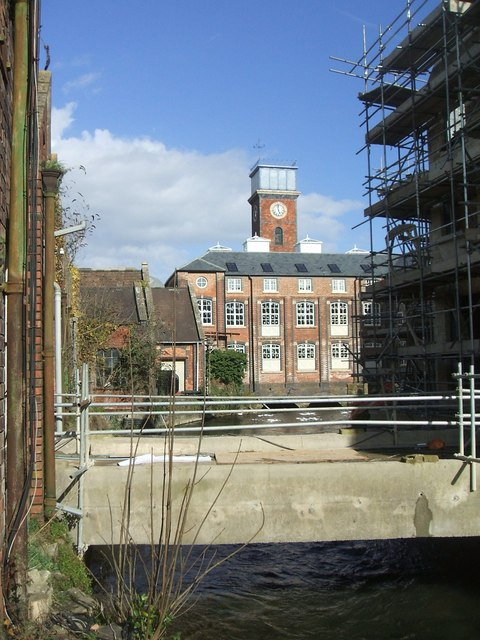
Redler's

The original Lightpill site is one actually located in Rodborough, but in light of inter-war and 1960s developments, exists now further in Dudbridge. A cloth mill from the 17th century, in 1910 it became home to a printing works. In 1910 Syrolit Ltd became one of the world's first plastic manufacturers, which in 1914 was reorganised into Erinoid in order to gain a UK license to manufacture a German process to manufacture a new plastic substance used for buttons and ornaments. By 1933, the business had expanded south on the site and employed 500 people. Taken over by O. & M. Kleeman Ltd in 1957, it was than merged into Mobil in 1961. In 1965 the complex was acquired by BP, operating initially as BP Plastics and later as BP Chemicals International. After takeover the site expanded west up to the Stroud railway line spur, producing polyvinyl chloride products, latterly bin bags. In 1973, when 700 people were employed, the factory manufactured polystyrene, articles in thermo-plastic materials for use in the electrical and building industries, and casein and polyester button blanks. To accommodate increased production, three large chemical containers were constructed on the west side of the railway line on the former dye works, supplied daily by Wincanton Transport trucks shipping raw chemical products from the docks at Southampton, Bristol and Sharpness. Closed in the late 1980s, the production site became the Bath Road Trading Estate, while the former dye works and chemical storage area became a new housing estate.

In 1770, dyer Richard Hawker built Dudbridge House close to the river and his works. In 2007 the house has been converted into flats, and faces a housing estate which was built in the 1980s on part of the old dyeworks.

In 1849, Kimmins Mill was constructed to mill flour. After ceasing milling in 1935, it was used as a storage facility, including textile machinery. Now located next to a Sainsbury's carpark, it is now the Stroud Mills Heritage centre, with a national collection of books and information about the construction industry, and historic information about the Stroud area.

Up until 1900, the site where Sainsbury's supermarket now sits was an orchard, with an attached small foundry. Before the First World War, James Apperley founded the Dudbridge Patent Machine Works to manufacture textile machinery, but after his business failed H. G. Holbrow manufactured steam engines, and then J. D. Humpidge manufactured gas engines. In the late 1920s, Hampton cars were assembled there. After their failure, the site reverted to a foundry until the late early 1990s, home to the cupola iron furnaces of Lewis & Holes Ltd.

To the top of Dudbridge Hill, and on the junction between Dudbridge and Rodborough on the A46 road to Bath, lies the Daniels industrial estate. In 1840, Thomas Daniels founded an engineering, millwrighting and foundry business which quickly grew. After the death of Lionel Daniels in 1956, the company became Daniels plc (listed on the London Stock Exchange), which was taken over by Unichrome International in 1968. After the site closed in the late 1980s, it was converted to an industrial estate, whose tenants included a Focus DIY store.

=== Hampton Cars ===
The Hampton Engineering Company had been formed in Kings Norton, Birmingham in 1912, but after it went into receivership, in 1919 the company was re-established as a joint venture between William Paddon and Charles Apperley of the Stroud Metal and Plating Company, and production was transferred to Dudbridge. The first post-war car was the Hampton 11.9 with either a 1496 cc or 1795 cc Dorman four-cylinder engine but only a few were made before the money ran out and the company was bought by a major shareholder John Daniel and re-registered as Hampton Engineering Co (1920) Ltd. In 1925 a receiver was appointed yet again, but Hampton bounced back again as Hampton Cars (London) Ltd with finance from businessman John Hatton-Hall. The company moved to smaller premises on Selsley Hill, before ceasing production just before World War II.

== Present day ==
Dudbridge today is a mixed industrial and housing development, with the industry towards the foot of the valley on one side of the A419 road, while the housing rises higher up towards Rodborough. Redevelopments of the late 1990s brought about the building of a major Sainsbury's supermarket, serving southern Stroud and onwards to Stonehouse. Damien Hirst's SCIENCE art production facility lies within the area.

Along with most of Stroud, Dudbridge has low levels of burglary, theft of motor vehicles, with numbers of serious and fatal road traffic accidents lower than the county average. The percentage of young offenders resident in the area and of children with low scores at key stages 1–3, are also below the Stroud and county averages.

== Transport ==
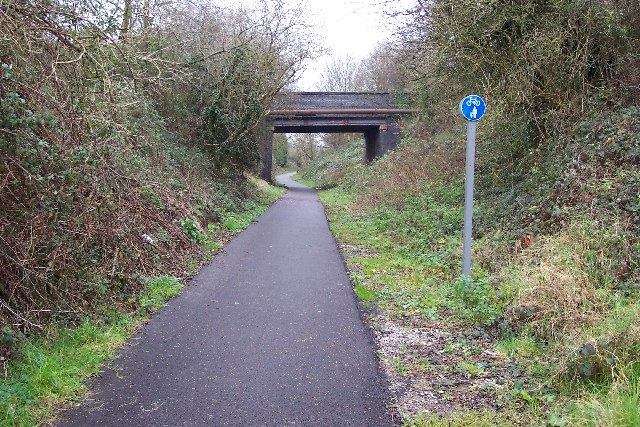
The former Stonehouse and Nailsworth Railway branch to Stroud at Dudbridge, now a cycle path. The road bridge carries Dudbridge Hill Road

Being low in the Stroud Valleys, and an already formed crossing point, Dudbridge was a natural point of congregation for transport. The Stroudwater Canal opened a wharf in 1779 in Dudbridge, while in 1886 the Stonehouse and Nailsworth Railway, later part of the Midland Railway, opened a railway station. Opened as "Dudbridge for Stroud," the buildings included a two-storey station-master's house, and though there was originally only a single platform, the station was a passing place on the single-track branch line.

In 1885, the Midland Railway built a very short branch line from Dudbridge to Stroud. The new line opened for goods traffic in 1885 and for passengers the following year, at which point Dudbridge became a junction station, and a second platform was built. Passenger services were suspended on the line as an economy measure to save fuel in June 1947, and were officially withdrawn from 8 June 1949. Dudbridge remained open for goods traffic until 1966, when the Beeching cuts closed the line. The station building remained until the early 1990s, when it was demolished to make way for the route of the Ebley Bypass.
