= Ryeford railway station =

Former railway station in England

Ryeford
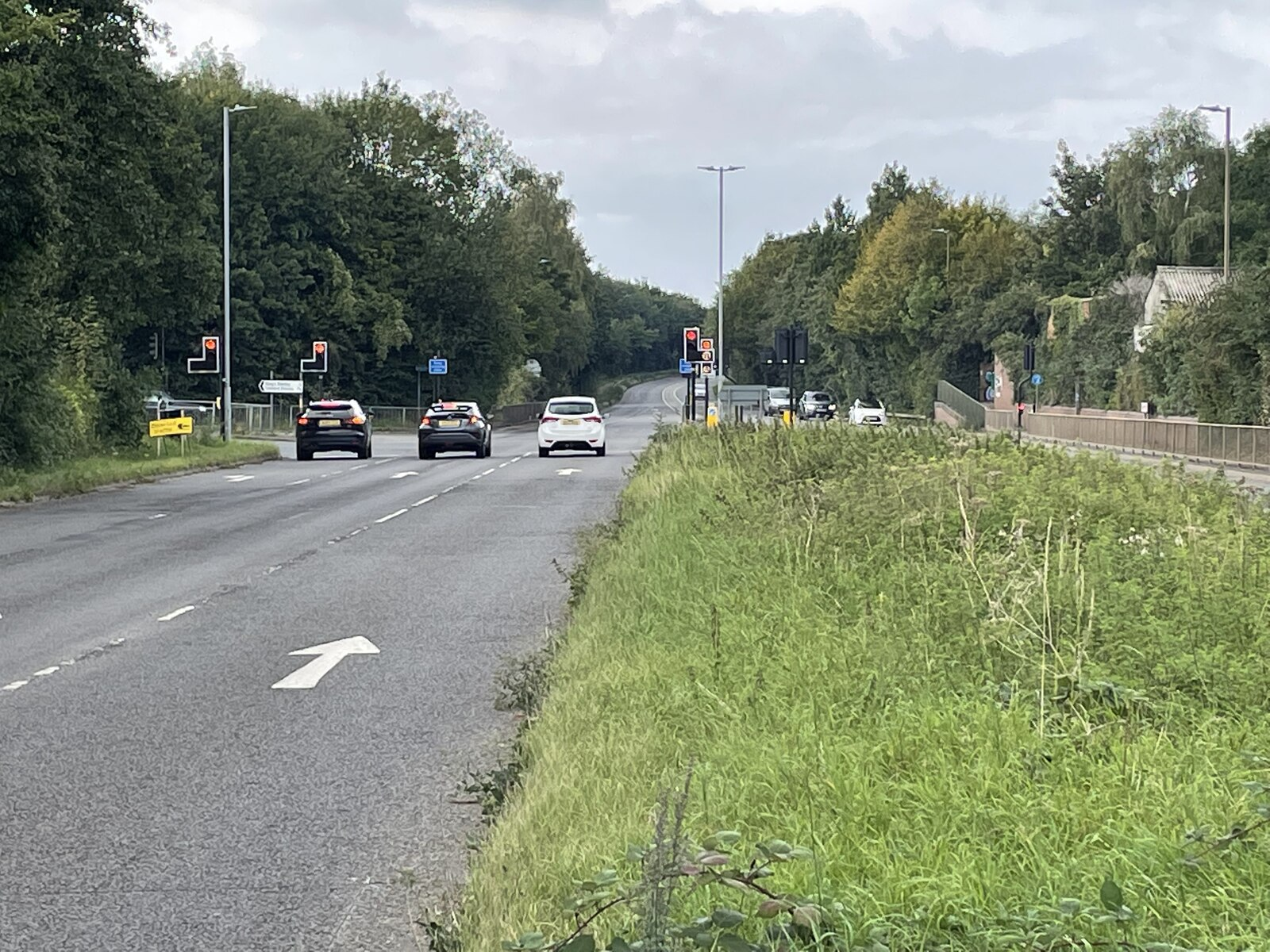
- The site of the station in 2021

General information
- Location: Ryeford, Stroud; England
- Coordinates: 51.7388°N 2.2715°W
- Grid reference: SO813045
- Platforms: 1

Other information
- Status: Disused

History
- Original company: Stonehouse and Nailsworth Railway
- Pre-grouping: Midland Railway
- Post-grouping: London, Midland and Scottish Railway

Key dates
- 4 February 1867: Opened
- 16 June 1947: Last train
- 8 June 1949: Official closure
Location

Ryeford railway station served the villages of Ryeford, King's Stanley and Leonard Stanley in Gloucestershire, England. It was on the 5.8-mile (9.3 km) Stonehouse and Nailsworth Railway, later part of the Midland Railway.

The station opened with the railway in 1867. It was large for a country station and included a two-storey station-master's house. The single platform at Ryeford was unusually wide. Sidings served a large timber yard, and a signalbox was sited at Ryeford when the short branch to Stroud from Dudbridge, the next station towards Nailsworth, opened in 1885.

The Stonehouse and Nailsworth Railway, along with the rest of the Midland Railway, became part of the London Midland and Scottish Railway at the 1923 Grouping. Passenger services were suspended on the line as an economy measure to save fuel in June 1947, and were officially withdrawn from 8 June 1949. Ryeford remained open for goods traffic until 1964, though the signalbox closed in 1958. The line itself closed for goods traffic in 1966. The station buildings at Ryeford have been demolished and the line of the track is used for the A419 road.

== Services ==
Preceding station	Disused railways	Following station
Stonehouse (Bristol Road); Line and station closed	Midland Railway; Stonehouse and Nailsworth Railway	Dudbridge; Line and station closed
