= CFB (car) =

Overview
- Manufacturer: CFB Car Syndicate Ltd
- Production: 1920-1921

Body and chassis
- Class: cyclecar
- Body style: open two seat

Powertrain
- Engine: 1078 cc Precision V twin-cylinder
- Transmission: friction drive

Chronology
- Successor: none

The CFB was a British four-wheeled cyclecar made between 1920 and 1921 by the CFB Car Syndicate Ltd of Upper Norwood, London. The company name stood for Charles Frederick Beauvais who later went on to build the Bow-V-Car and then joined coachbuilder New Avon Body Company designing bodies for Standard, Crossley Motors and others. Very few CFBs were made.

The 1078 cc, air-cooled, Precision V twin engine with RAC rating of 9 hp was coupled to a friction drive which gave a varying drive ratio by moving the driven wheel along a cone. This then used bevel gears to connect to a countershaft and thence to the rear wheels by a belt.

== See also ==
- List of car manufacturers of the United Kingdom
