= Dudbridge railway station =

Former railway station in England

Dudbridge
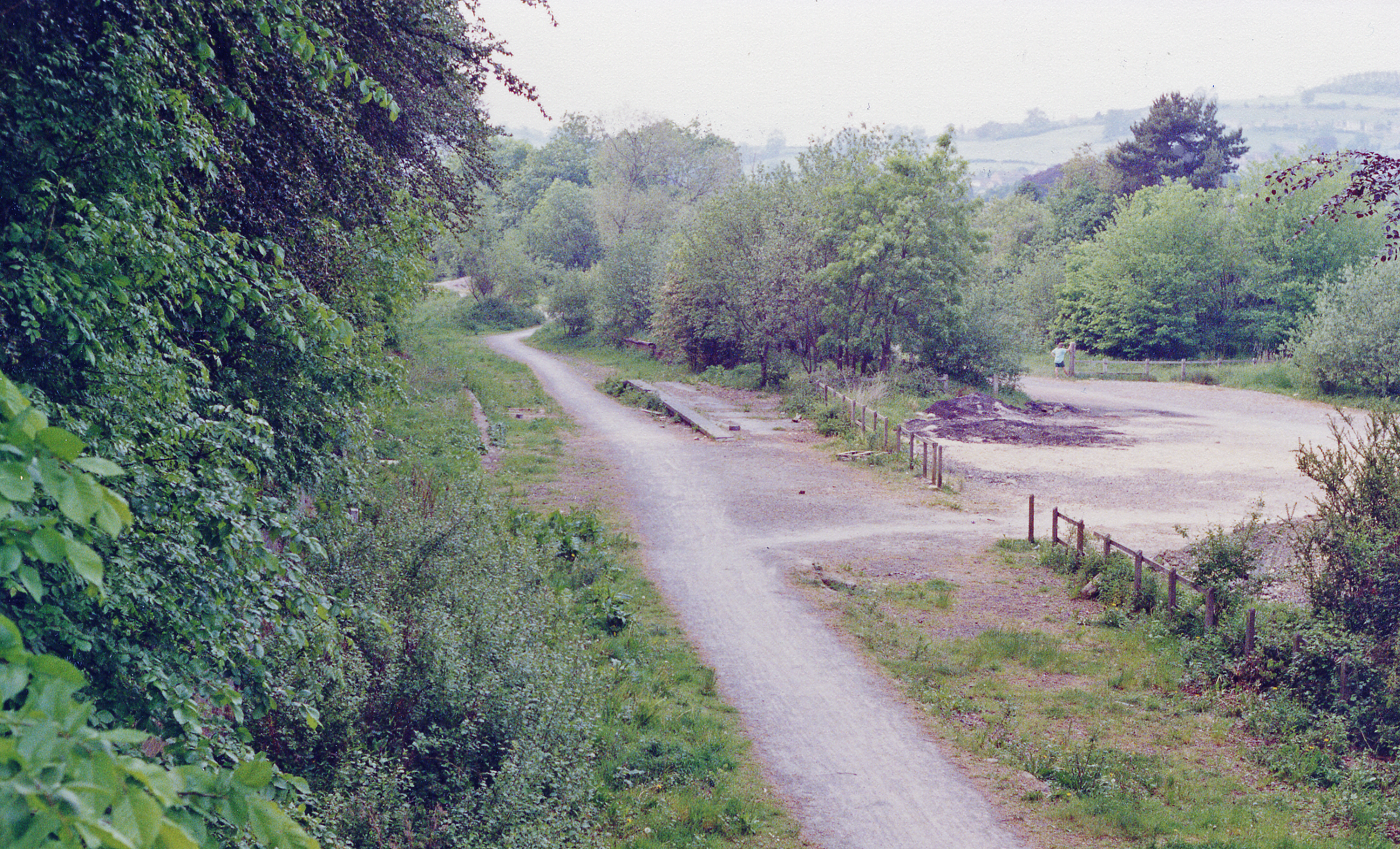
- Site of the station in 1990

General information
- Location: Dudbridge, Stroud; England
- Coordinates: 51.738225°N 2.241604°W
- Grid reference: SO833044
- Platforms: 2

Other information
- Status: Disused

History
- Original company: Stonehouse and Nailsworth Railway
- Pre-grouping: Midland Railway
- Post-grouping: London, Midland and Scottish Railway

Key dates
- 4 February 1867: Opened as Dudbridge for Stroud
- 1 July 1886: Renamed Dudbridge
- 16 June 1947: Last train
- 8 June 1949: Official closure
Location

Dudbridge railway station served the Stroud suburb of Dudbridge and the village of Selsley, little more than 1 mile (1.6 km) from Stroud, in Gloucestershire, England. The station was on the 5 3/4 miles (9.3 km) long Stonehouse and Nailsworth Railway, later part of the Midland Railway.

The station opened as "Dudbridge for Stroud" with the railway in 1867. The buildings included a two-storey station-master's house and though there was originally only a single platform, the station was a passing place on the single-track branch line.

In 1885, the Midland Railway built a very short branch line from Dudbridge to Stroud. The new line opened for goods traffic in 1885 and for passengers the following year, at which point Dudbridge became a junction station, and a second platform was built.

The Stonehouse and Nailsworth Railway, along with the rest of the Midland Railway, became part of the London Midland and Scottish Railway at the 1923 Grouping. Passenger services were suspended on the line as an economy measure to save fuel in June 1947, and were officially withdrawn from 8 June 1949. Dudbridge remained open for goods traffic until 1966.

The station buildings survived and were occupied until the early 1990s, when they were demolished. Most of the former station site has now been consumed by the redevelopment of the A419 road for the Ebley bypass, with the Dudbridge to Ryeford section used as route for the roadway. In 2026, volunteers restored some of the station features.

== Services ==
Preceding station	Disused railways	Following station
Ryeford; Line and station closed	Midland Railway; Stonehouse and Nailsworth Railway	Woodchester; Line and station closed
Ryeford; Line and station closed	Midland Railway; Stroud branch	Stroud; Line and station closed
