= Nailsworth railway station =

Former railway station in England

Nailsworth
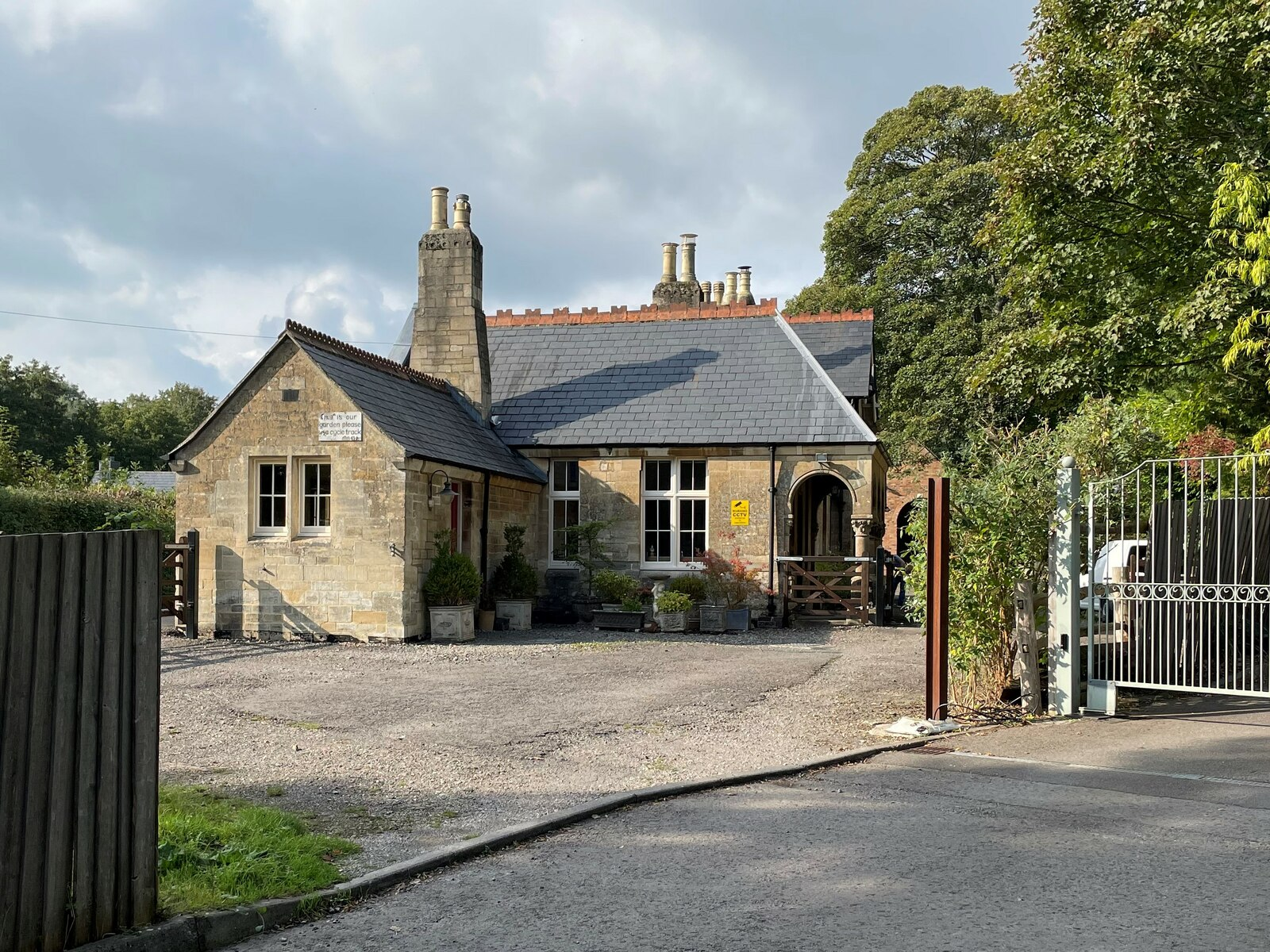
- The site of the station in 2021

General information
- Location: Nailsworth, Stroud; England
- Coordinates: 51.6983°N 2.2202°W
- Grid reference: SO849000
- Platforms: 1

Other information
- Status: Disused

History
- Original company: Stonehouse and Nailsworth Railway
- Pre-grouping: Midland Railway
- Post-grouping: London, Midland and Scottish Railway

Key dates
- 4 February 1867: Opened
- 16 June 1947: Last passenger train
- 8 June 1949: Official closure
- 1966: closed for freight
Location

Nailsworth railway station served the town of Nailsworth in Gloucestershire, England and was the terminus of the 5 3/4-mile (9.3 km) long Stonehouse and Nailsworth Railway, later part of the Midland Railway.

The railway was built to meet local demand for a connection to the UK national railway network and was opened in 1867. The Nailsworth railway promoters were ambitious, and sited the station on an embankment above the town with the intention that the railway would be extended southwards towards Tetbury and Malmesbury. The station consisted of a large Cotswold stone building, with several rooms, and it also acted as the railway company's headquarters. There was also a large goods yard, and a month after the railway opened, Nailsworth's first market was held.

Thoughts of prosperity and expansion proved fleeting, however, and the railway company was subsumed very quickly into the Midland Railway, into whose main Bristol to Gloucester main line the branch line linked at Stonehouse. Nailsworth remained the terminus station for the branch line, and there were fewer than 10 trains a day in each direction on the line in 1910.

The Stonehouse and Nailsworth Railway, along with the rest of the Midland Railway, became part of the London Midland and Scottish Railway at the 1923 Grouping. Passenger services were suspended on the line as an economy measure to save fuel in June 1947, and were officially withdrawn from 8 June 1949. However, Nailsworth's goods yard remained open for goods traffic until 1966, and the station buildings and goods yard structures are still standing, the former in private residential use.

== Services ==
Preceding station	Disused railways	Following station
Woodchester; Line and station closed	Midland Railway; Stonehouse and Nailsworth Railway	Terminus
