= Woodchester railway station =

Former railway station in England

Woodchester

General information
- Location: Woodchester, Stroud; England
- Coordinates: 51.7186°N 2.2315°W
- Grid reference: SO842023
- Platforms: 1

Other information
- Status: Disused

History
- Original company: Stonehouse and Nailsworth Railway
- Pre-grouping: Midland Railway
- Post-grouping: London, Midland and Scottish Railway

Key dates
- 1 July 1867: Opened
- 16 June 1947: Last passenger train
- 8 June 1949: Official closure
- 1964: closed for freight
Location

Woodchester railway station served the villages of Woodchester and Amberley in Gloucestershire, England. It was on the 9.3 km-long Stonehouse and Nailsworth Railway, later part of the Midland Railway.

The station opened six months after the railway and its other stations, on 1 July 1867. The delay was allegedly due to resistance from objectors who thought the provision of a station might encourage attendance at a nearby Catholic chapel. When the station was provided, it was given scruffy wooden buildings, unlike the substantial stone-built stations elsewhere on the line, a sign of the influence of the Midland Railway and the financial problems of the Stonehouse and Nailsworth Railway.

Woodchester was a busy station with tourists visiting Amberley, which was identified with "Enderley" in the novel John Halifax, Gentleman. It also had a large volume of goods traffic.

The Stonehouse and Nailsworth Railway, along with the rest of the Midland Railway, became part of the London Midland and Scottish Railway at the 1923 Grouping. Passenger services were suspended on the line as an economy measure to save fuel in June 1947, and were officially withdrawn from 8 June 1949. Woodchester remained open for goods traffic until 1964. The line itself closed for goods traffic in 1966. The station buildings at Woodchester have all been demolished, though the station-master's house remains and the line of the track is used as a pedestrian and cycle path between Dudbridge and Nailsworth.

== Services ==
Preceding station	Disused railways	Following station
Dudbridge; Line and station closed	Midland Railway; Stonehouse and Nailsworth Railway	Nailsworth; Line and station closed
