= Frocester =

Village in Gloucestershire, England

Coordinates: 51.72°N 2.31°W

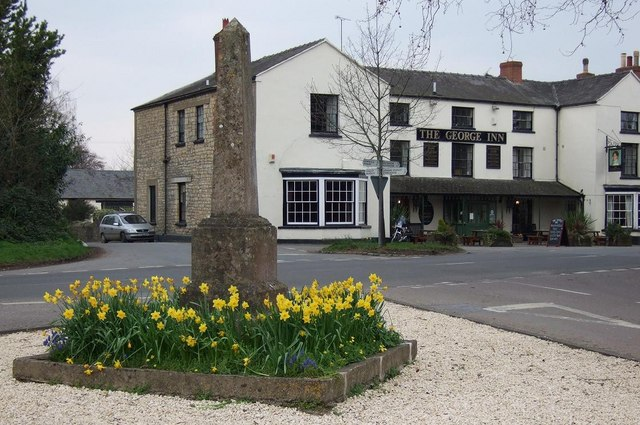
- Village centre

- Location within Gloucestershire
- Population: 155
- OS grid reference: SO7803
- Civil parish: Frocester
- District: Stroud
- Shire county: Gloucestershire
- Region: South West
- Country: England
- Sovereign state: United Kingdom
- Post town: Stonehouse
- Postcode district: GL10
- Dialling code: 01453
- Police: Gloucestershire
- Fire: Gloucestershire
- Ambulance: South Western
- UK Parliament: Stroud

Frocester (/ˈfrɒstər/ FROS-tər) is a village and civil parish in Stroud District, Gloucestershire, England. It lies below the Cotswold escarpment, 10 miles south of Gloucester and 4 miles west of Stroud. In the 2001 census the parish had a population of 194, decreasing to 155 at the 2011 Census.

Frocester was the site of a Roman settlement, on a Roman road which ran from Cirencester to Arlingham. The remains of a Roman villa have been excavated in the grounds of Frocester Court, and another near the remains of St Peter’s Church. The name of the village, first recorded in the Domesday Book of 1086 as Frowecestre, means "Roman town on the Frome", although the River Frome is just beyond the present northern boundary of the parish.

In 1726 the line of the Roman road became a turnpike road, and formed part of the coaching route between Gloucester and Bath. Use of the road declined in the 19th century, and it is now a minor road.

Between 1844 and 1961, Frocester had a railway station on the Bristol and Gloucester Railway, later the Midland Railway.

For the past 33 years, Frocester has been the site of the Frocester Beer Festival, organised by the Dursley Lions as a fund-raising event. Usually over 100 beers, from all over the British Isles, are offered at this popular event.

== Frocester Court ==
Frocester Court is a Grade II* listed building within the village. Once much larger, it was vastly reduced in size in the mid 19th century. The Victorian rebuilding of the house and its precincts hid many medieval features which remain in situ. Parts of the house predate the Reformation, while other parts date from the 15th century.

The grounds have a late medieval dovecote and a Grade I listed late 13th-century estate barn.

In the mid-1800s the estate was owned by John Altham Graham-Clarke, who was keen on plants. An unusual contorted variety of hazel was discovered growing in a hedge on the estate in 1863, and distributed from there to other estates by their gardeners. This contorted hazel is still popular in UK gardens.
