= Stonehouse (Bristol Road) railway station =

Disused railway station in England

Coordinates: 51.7470°N 2.2932°W

Stonehouse (Bristol Road)
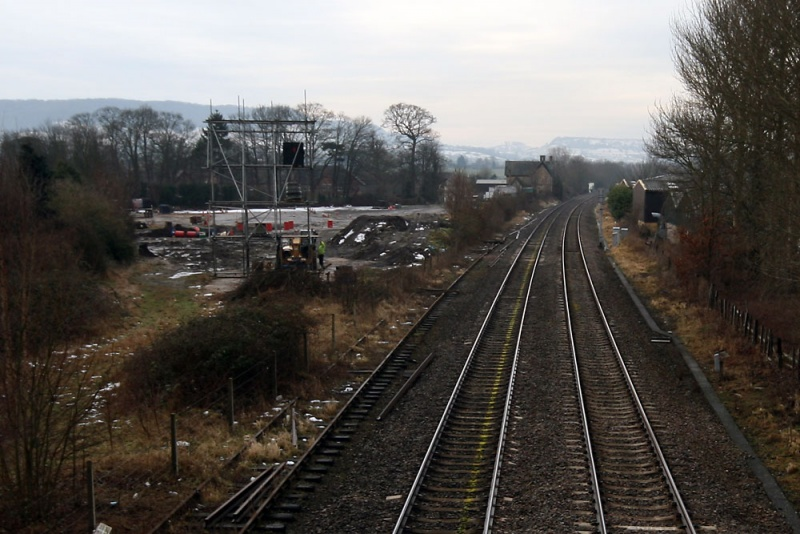
- The site of Stonehouse (Bristol Road) station as viewed from the north. The surviving Station Master's house can be seen in the distance.

General information
- Location: Stonehouse, Stroud; England
- Grid reference: SO798054
- Platforms: 3

Other information
- Status: Disused

History
- Original company: Bristol and Gloucester Railway
- Pre-grouping: Midland Railway
- Post-grouping: London, Midland and Scottish Railway

Key dates
- 8 July 1844: Opened as Stonehouse
- 17 September 1951: Renamed Stonehouse (Bristol Road)
- 4 January 1965: Closed to Passengers
- 3 January 1966: Closed to Goods
Location

Stonehouse (Bristol Road) railway station, also known as Stroudwater station after the nearby canal, was a station in Stonehouse, England, on the Bristol and Gloucester Railway between Haresfield and Frocester.

== History ==
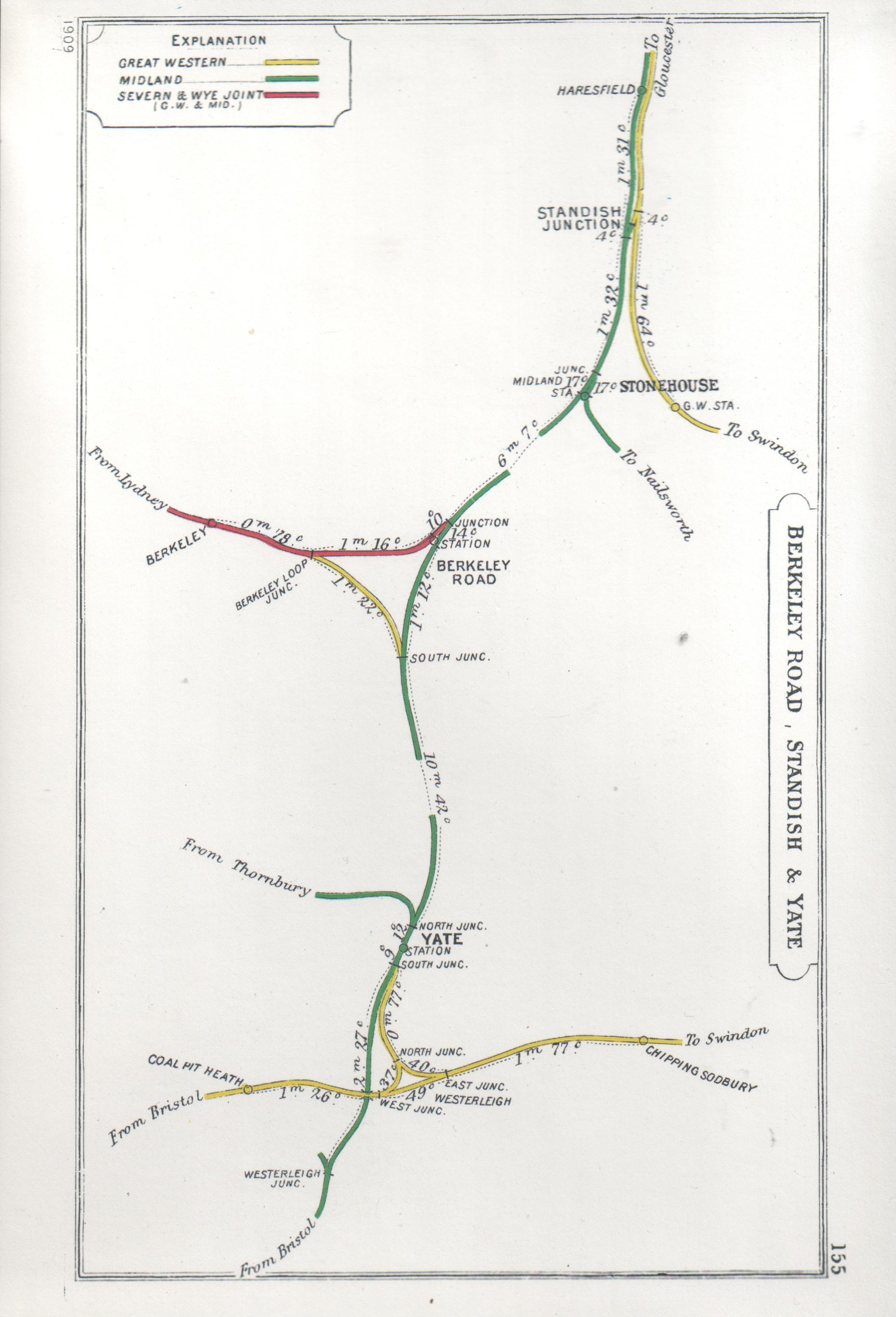
A 1909 Railway Clearing House map of railways in the vicinity of Stonehouse, shown here as MIDLAND STA.

The station was called, first and unofficially, Eastington Road and then, officially, Bristol Road to distinguish it from a second station, Stonehouse (Burdett Road), which was on the Cheltenham and Great Western Union Railway, now the Golden Valley Line, between Gloucester and Swindon. Its proximity to the older Stroudwater Navigation, opened in 1779, led to this name also coming into local usage.

Bristol Road station was the junction for the Stonehouse and Nailsworth Railway's branch line to Nailsworth, which later had a small branch line of its own to Stroud. Unusually, the junction was to the north of Stonehouse (Bristol Road) station, and the branch line platform was a separate affair to the east of the main line station and connected by a covered pathway. The Nailsworth/Stroud branch lost its passenger services in 1947 as an economy measure, with official closure in 1949, though goods services remained until 1966.

Services to and from the Bristol Road station on the main line closed to passengers under the Beeching Axe in 1965 and to goods traffic the following year. The redundant goods yard became the Stonehouse Coal Concentration Depot from 7 October 1966. It closed in 1989.

== Reopening plans ==
In July 2017, plans were proposed to reopen the station, which would provide a fast and direct link to Bristol. In September 2020, Stroud District Council announced that they had backed plans to reopen the railway station. In October 2021, the UK government's "Restoring Your Railway" fund provided £50,000 towards feasibility studies. A strategic outline business case (SOBC) was finalised in September 2022, concluding strongly in support of the reopening, but the Restoring Your Railway fund was discontinued in July 2024 before the project could continue. However, the plans continue to be supported by local councils and regional rail development partnerships, albeit at relatively low priority.

== Services ==
Preceding station	Disused railways	Following station
Frocester; Station closed	Bristol and Gloucester Railway; Midland Railway	Haresfield; Station closed
Terminus	Stonehouse and Nailsworth Railway; Midland Railway	Ryeford; Line and station closed
