= New Avon (coachbuilder) =

British coachbuilder

New Avon was a British vehicle coachbuilder. The company, based in Warwick, was started when a Ben Tilton and a Captain Philips trading as Avon Coachworks went into business in 1919 to make bodywork for cars. Following a change of ownership and financial reconstruction it became New Avon in 1922.

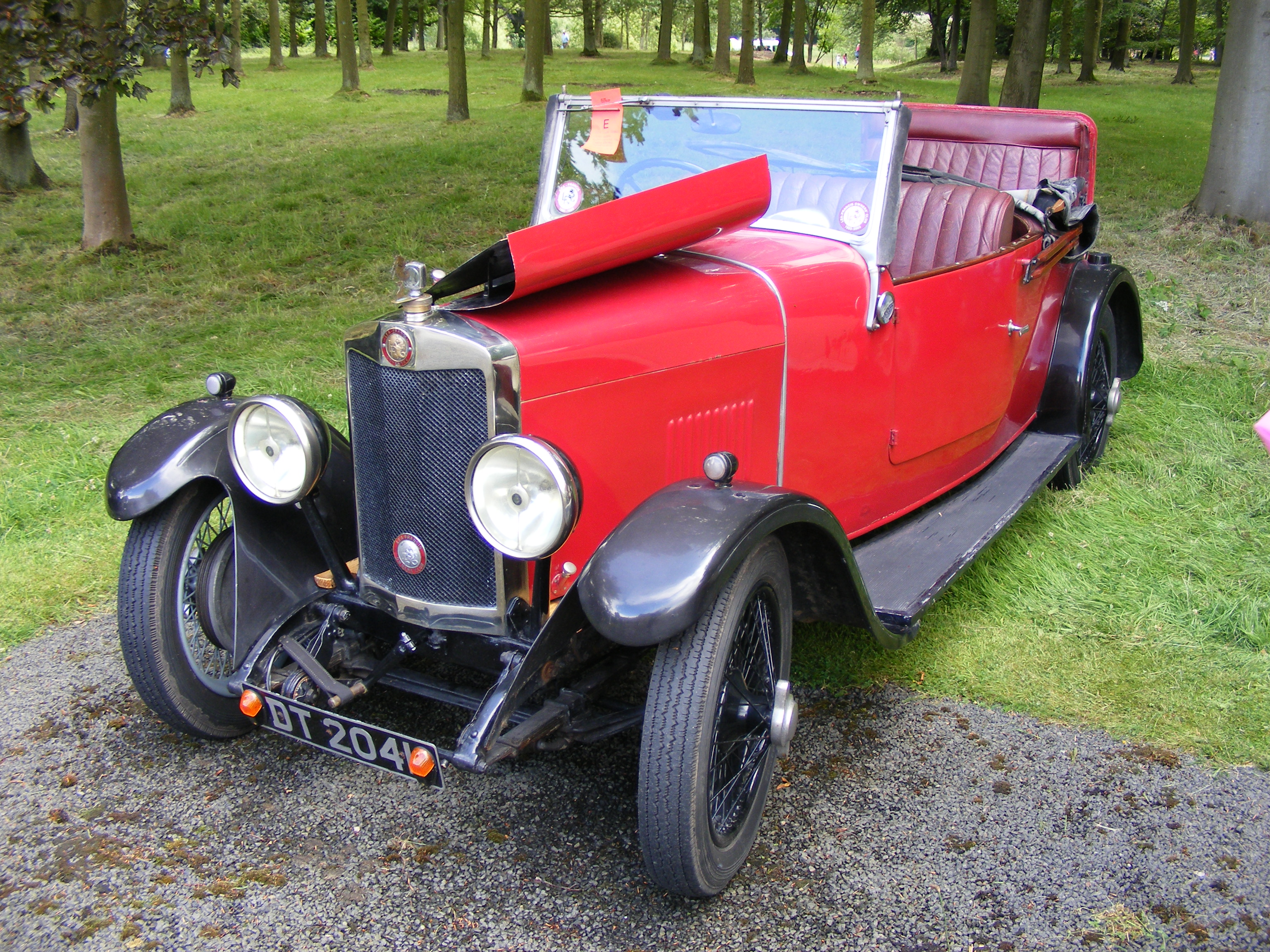
1929 Lea Francis O-type

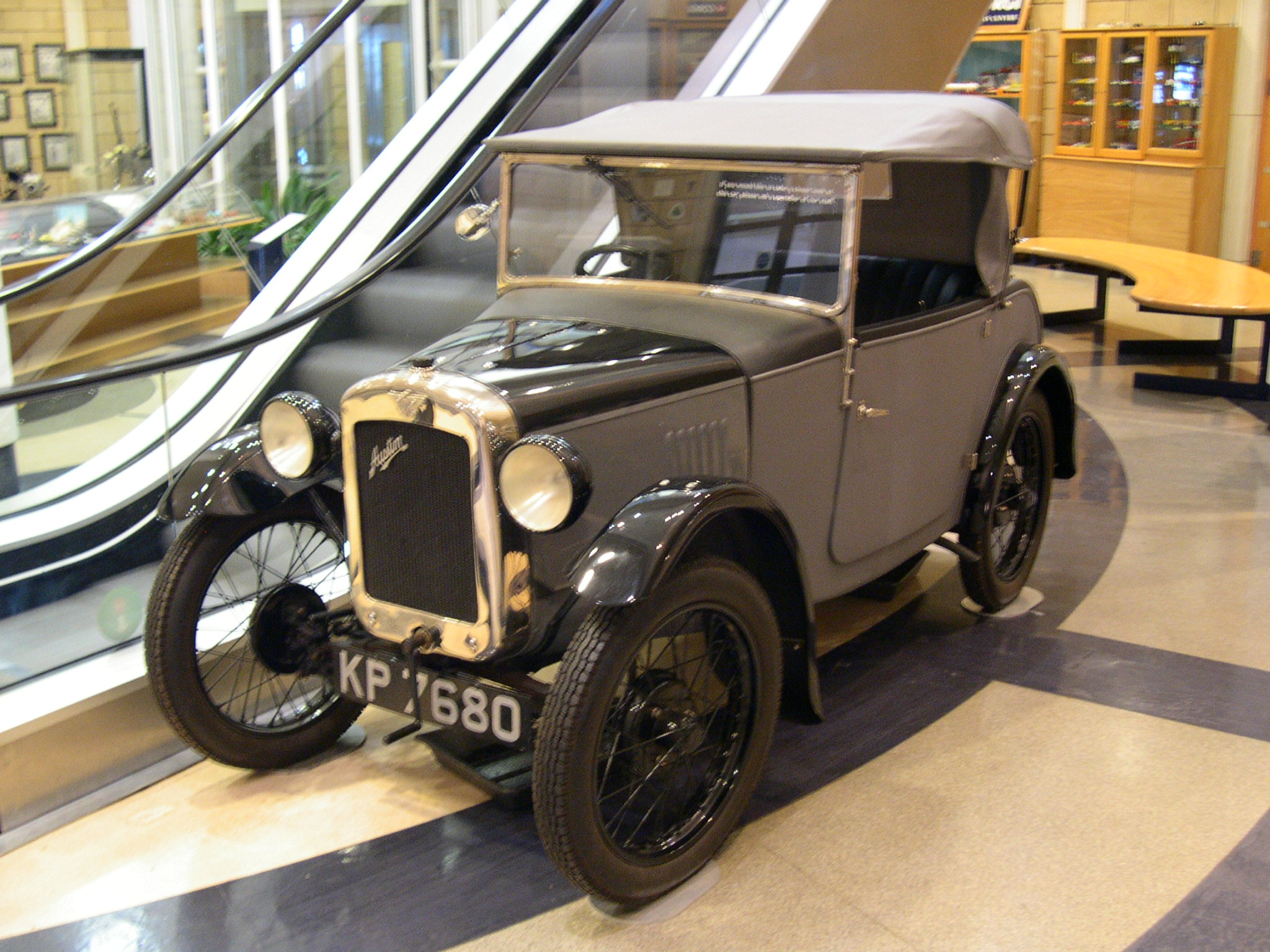
1928 Austin Seven sportsman's two seater

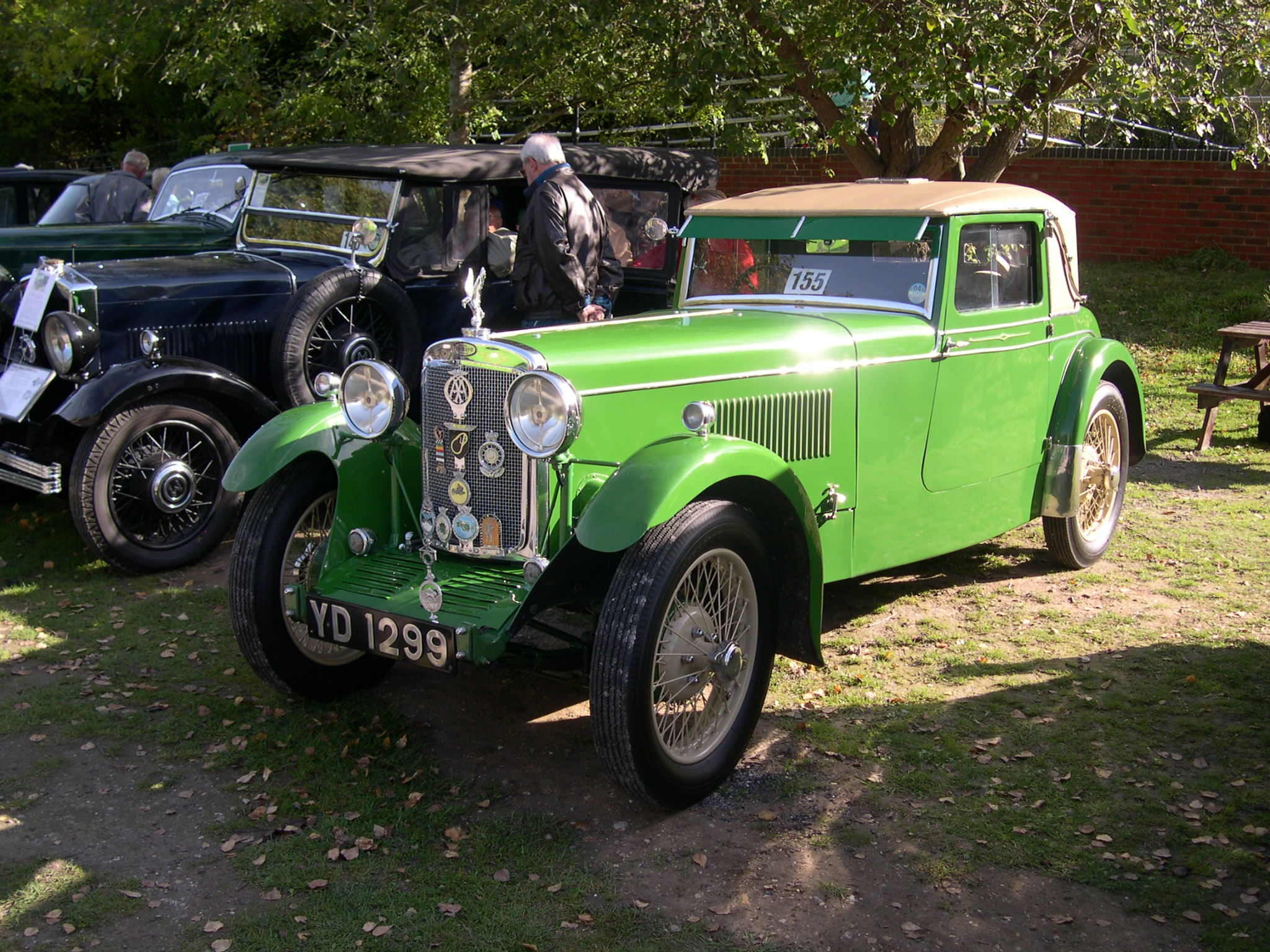
1930 Standard Sixteen Swan coupé

For the first few years their main customer was Lea-Francis but they also made coachwork for Hampton cars. In 1927 they produced an open two seat body for the Austin 7, followed in 1928 by a fixed head coupé, which went by the name of Swan, and then in 1929 a "sportsman's two seater" appeared. The Swan was the work of Alan Jensen, who had joined the company and would with his brother create Jensen Brothers, which later became Jensen Motors. Alan had come to the attention of New Avon when at the encouragement of Alfred Herbert Wilde (1891-1930), chief engineer of the Standard Motor Company, the brothers brought a new design for a body on a Standard 9 chassis which they wanted New Avon to put into production. This work came just in time as the Lea-Francis work stopped in 1931 when that company went into receivership.

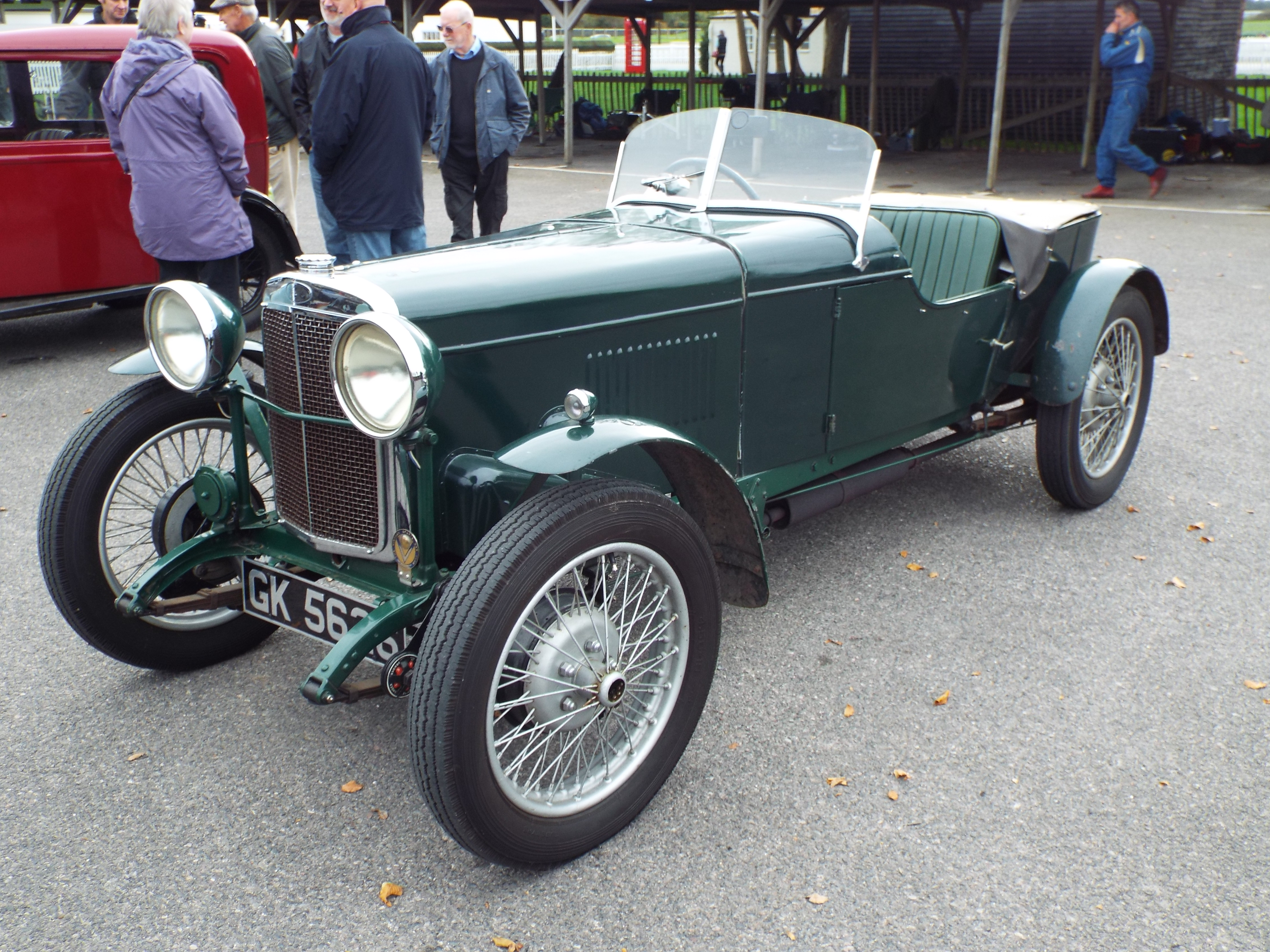
1931 Standard Big Nine Special two-seater Sports

For most of the 1930s work on Standard chassis dominated the output with Swan coupés and Wayfarer saloons but in 1930 they also exhibited a coupé body on a Wolseley Hornet and took their own stand at the 1931 London Motor Show. Alan Jensen left the company in 1930 and was replaced by Charles F. Beauvais, who had started the Bow-V-Car light car company. Beauvais produced more designs for Standard as well as work for Austin, Lanchester and Crossley Motors, which he would go on to join in 1933 as chief designer. He was replaced at New Avon by Arthur Meredith who had been working as foreman of the experimental bodyshop. Production peaked in 1933-35 with 30-40 cars a week being made by a workforce of around 80 in the three storey building in Wharf Street.

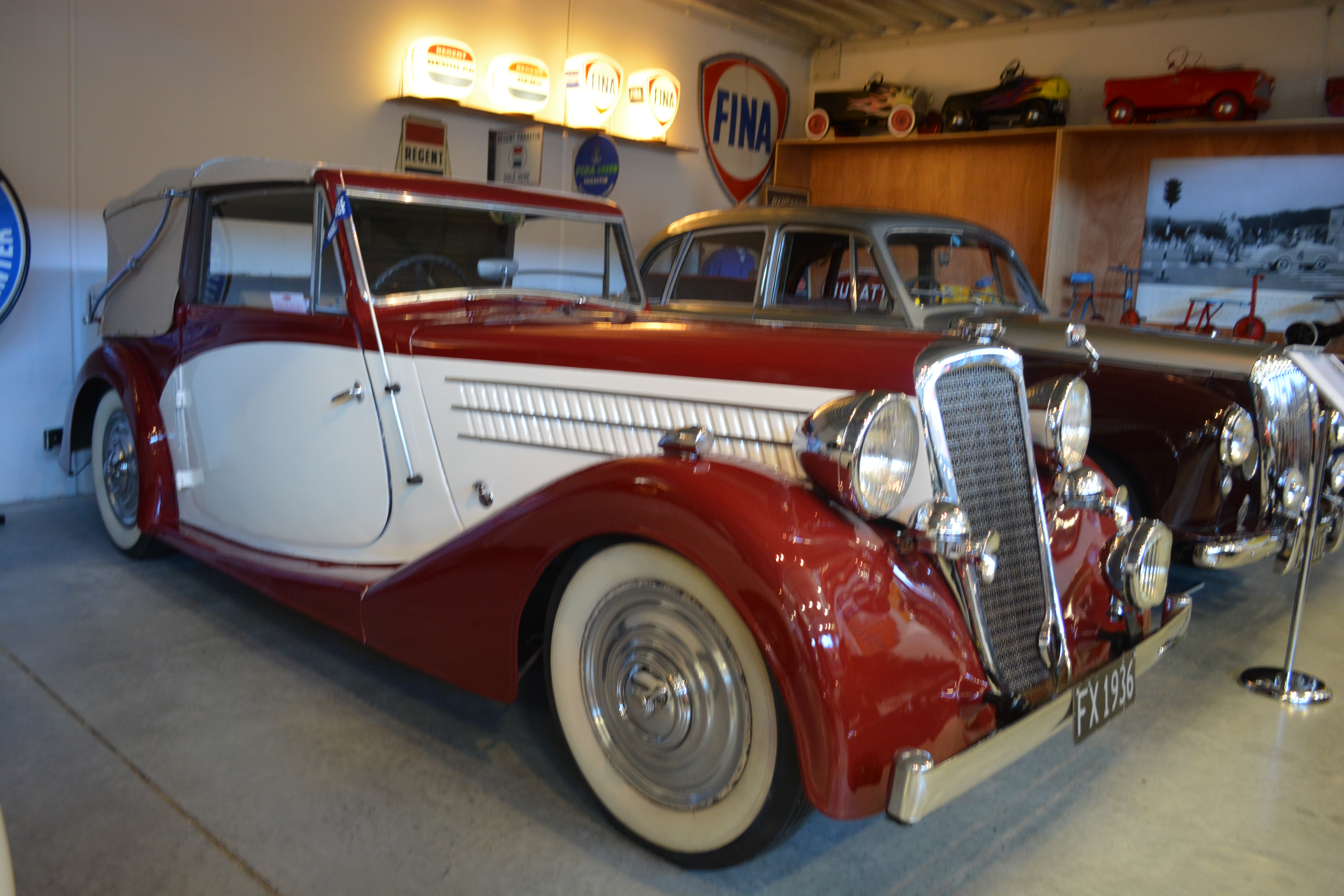
1936 Standard Sixteen Wayfarer drophead coupé

In 1935 the company was bought by John Maudslay, son of the founder of Standard, Reginald Maudslay, and became part of the Maudslay Motor Group. A showroom in London's Mayfair was opened and at the London Olympia Show five cars were exhibited. A move was made to new premises at Ladbroke House in Millers road.

In late 1937 there was a downturn in the company fortunes and New Avon was unable to pay their bill to Standard who foreclosed and forced bankruptcy. A new company, trading as Avon Bodies Ltd., took over the business moving to smaller premises at The Cape and managed to fit the existing stock of bodies onto Triumph Dolomite chassis. Lea-Francis was now back in business and the old ties were re-established with Avon, supplying Waymaker saloon bodies for their two-litre model.

During World War II Avon was occupied rebuilding aircraft and with peace tried to go back to car body making. That market had largely disappeared for good, but they were kept occupied by repair work and some conversions including hearses.

In 1973 Avon was sold to Graham Hudson who ran a large Midlands based car sales and repair organisation. In 1978 Ladbroke Avon Ltd incorporating Avon Special Products was formed. They made some special bodied Land Rovers and the Avon-Stevens XJC convertibles, designed by Anthony Stevens. In 1980 these were joined by the Stevens designed Jaguar XJ6 estate car which won the gold medal for coachbuilding at the 1980 Motor Show. Wanting to reach a larger market a conversion of the Triumph Acclaim was produced in 1981 followed by a turbocharged version.

The business, without the rights to use the Avon name, was finally sold in 1985.
