= Frocester railway station =

Former railway station in England

Coordinates: 51.7272°N 2.3183°W

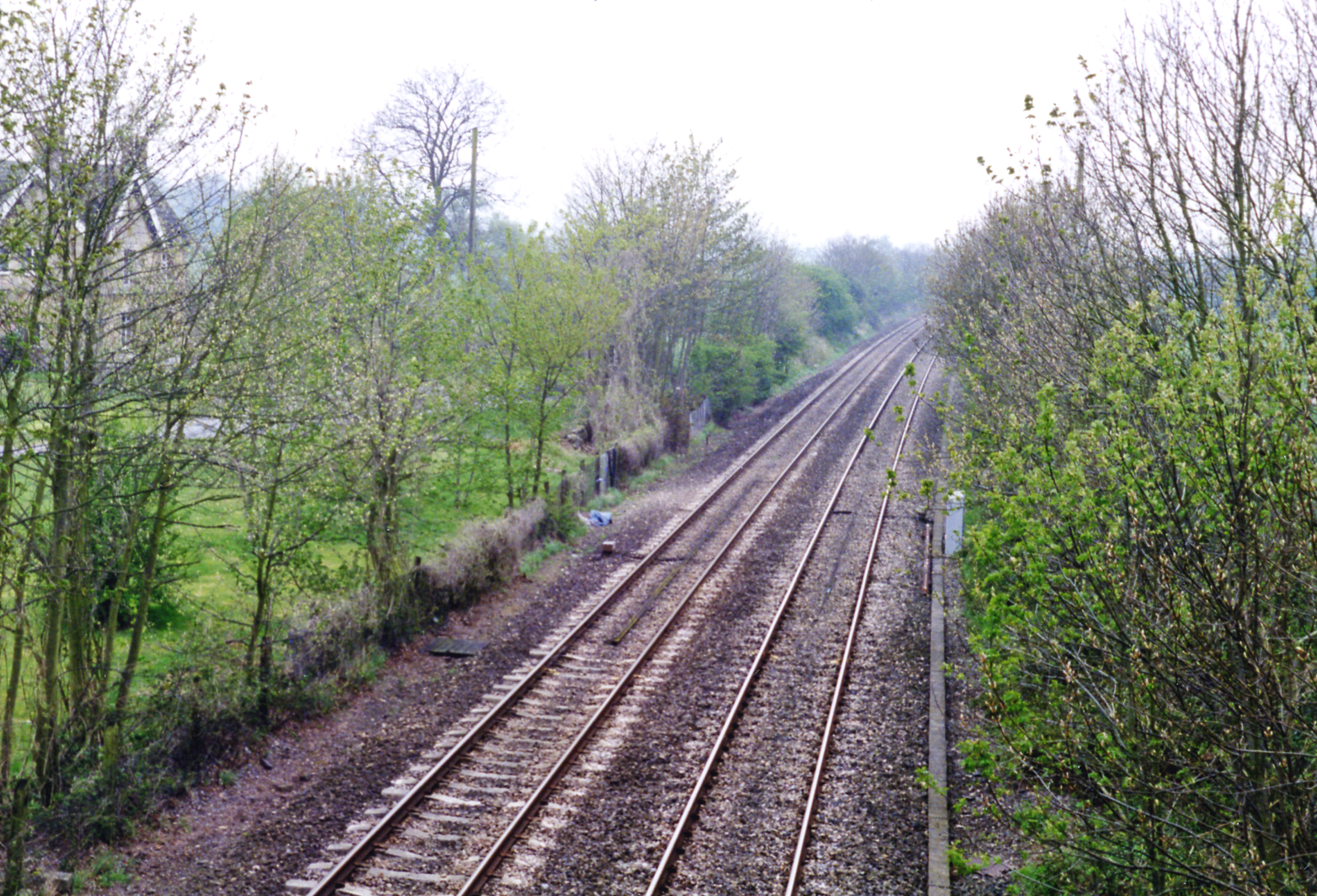
The site of the station in 1995

Frocester railway station served the village of Frocester in Gloucestershire, England. The station was on the Bristol and Gloucester Railway, originally a broad gauge line overseen by Isambard Kingdom Brunel, but later taken over by the Midland Railway and converted to standard gauge.

Frocester was a small station designed by Brunel, with short platforms, a small signalbox and a large stone goods shed. It opened with the railway in 1844 and remained virtually unchanged throughout its life, being the least used station on the Bristol to Gloucester line.

Passenger and goods services were withdrawn from Frocester on 11 December 1961, four years before other local stations on the line lost their services. The station buildings were demolished and the signalbox also closed. The station-master's house remains in residential use.

== Services ==
Preceding station	Disused railways	Following station
Coaley Junction; Station resited and reopened as Cam and Dursley	Bristol and Gloucester Railway; Midland Railway	Stonehouse (Bristol Road); Station closed
