= All Saints Church, Selsley =

All Saints' Church, Selsley
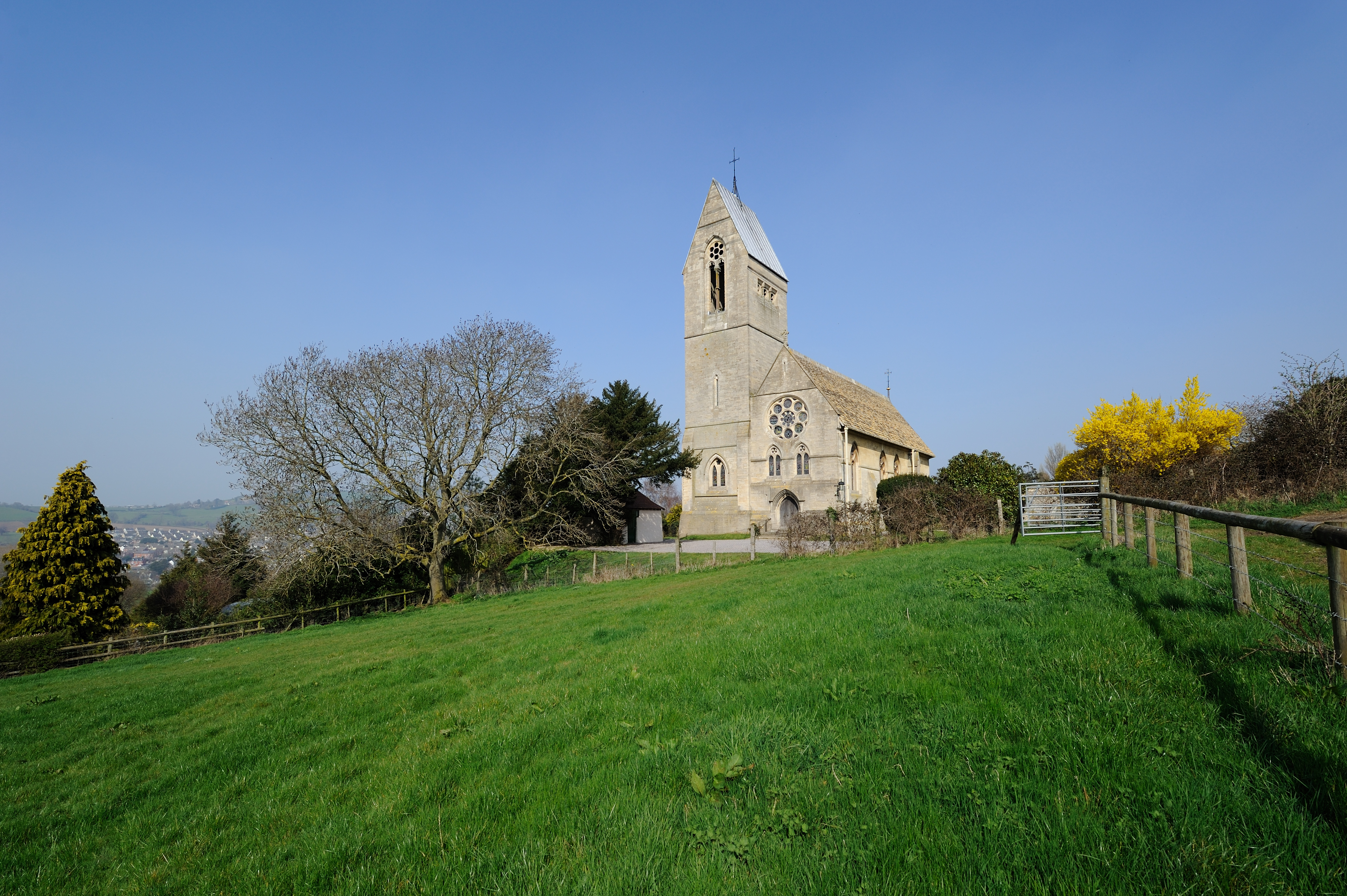
- All Saints' Church, Selsley
- 51.7327°N 2.2488°W
- Denomination: Church of England
- Churchmanship: Broad Church
- Website: allsaintsselsley.org.uk

History
- Dedication: All Saints

Administration
- Province: Canterbury
- Diocese: Gloucester
- Parish: Selsley

All Saints Church is the parish church for Selsley in Gloucestershire.

== Background ==
It is a celebrated early work by the important church architect G F Bodley, incorporating notable stained glass by William Morris and his company Morris & Co.

Bodley was given the commission by Samuel Marling, patriarch of the mill-owning family, who lived in the adjacent Stanley Park House.

The church has a distinctive 'saddleback' tower, derived from French Gothic architecture, which was a significant influence on Bodley's early style. Construction took place in 1861–62. Local labour and contractors were used: Harrison of King's Stanley were the main contractors; stone carvings were undertaken by Joshua Wall; woodwork by William English and ironwork by T.J. Chew. Another source of inspiration for the tower can be found in the parish church of Marling, South Tyrol near the spa city Meran, where Samuel Marling stayed in the 1860s.

Bodley designed the pews and choir-stalls using poppy-heads and fleur de lys as key motifs, and the font, the inlaid marble pulpit, communion rails and door iron work all show the attention to design that Bodley paid to all aspects of the church.

Equally spectacular is the stained glass. Bodley was a friend of William Morris and at Selsley he gave Morris & Co their first commission for ecclesiastical stained glass. Philip Webb provided the scheme for the whole church and the detail of the Creation window at the west end. Edward Burne-Jones, Dante Gabriel Rossetti, Ford Madox Brown and Campfield were all involved.

The church is rated with 3 stars in Simon Jenkins' England's Thousand Best Churches.

== Organ ==
The church has a pipe organ by Nicholson dating from 1862. A specification of the organ can be found on the National Pipe Organ Register.

== Churchyard ==
The churchyard contains war graves of a soldier of World War I and another of World War II.
