= King's Stanley =

Village in Gloucestershire, England

Coordinates: 51.73259°N 2.27362°W

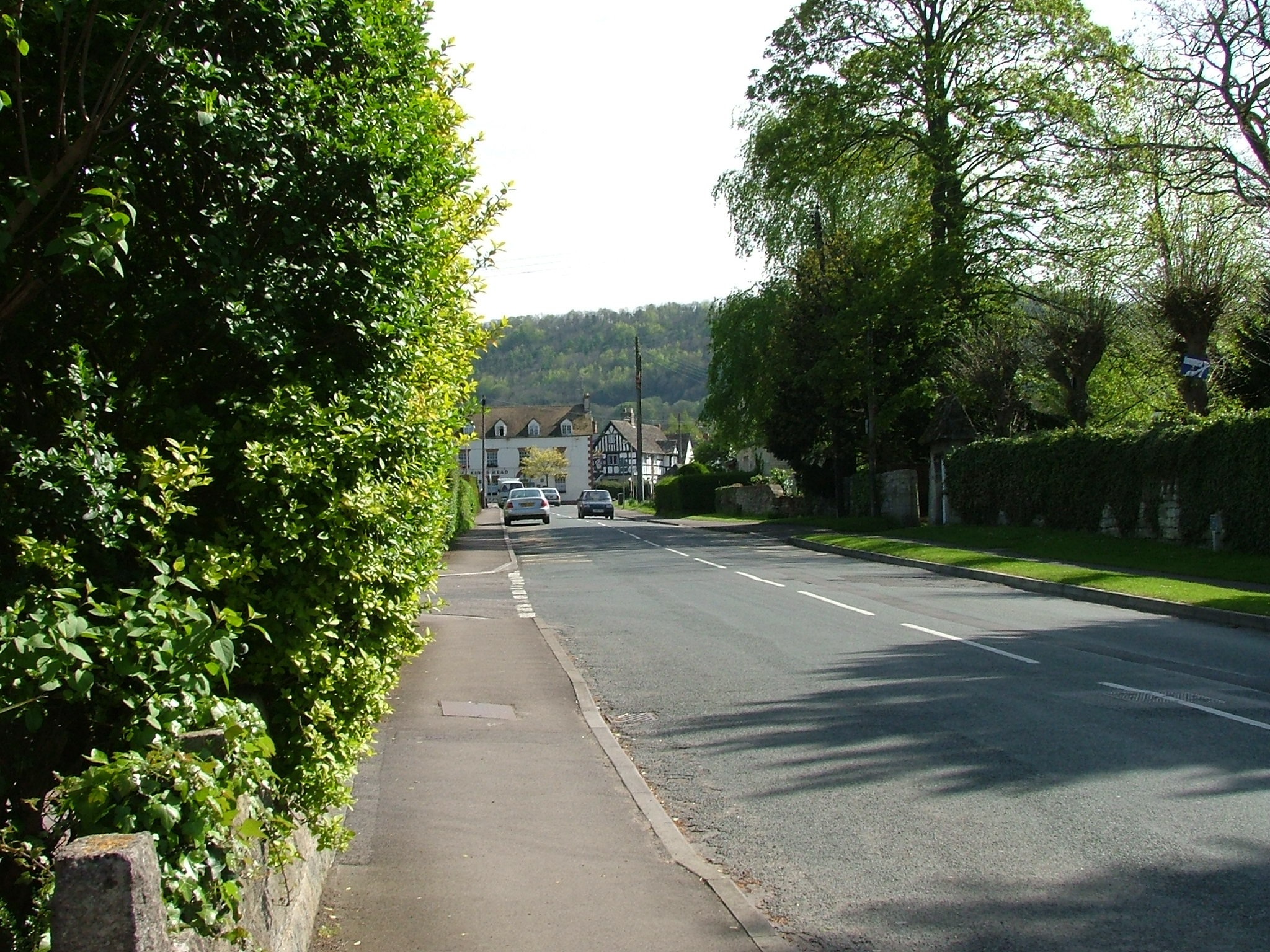
- Church Street, the main road through Kings Stanley, leading to the King's Head pub

- Location within Gloucestershire
- Population: 2,359 (2011)
- OS grid reference: SO812038
- Civil parish: King's Stanley
- District: Stroud
- Shire county: Gloucestershire
- Region: South West
- Country: England
- Sovereign state: United Kingdom
- Post town: Stonehouse
- Postcode district: GL10
- Dialling code: 01453
- Police: Gloucestershire
- Fire: Gloucestershire
- Ambulance: South Western
- UK Parliament: Stroud

King's Stanley is a civil parish and village in Gloucestershire, England, to the south of Stonehouse and southwest of the town of Stroud.

== Geography ==
The village is part of what is known locally as 'The Stanleys', along with its western neighbours Leonard Stanley and Stanley Downton. The parish includes the village of Middleyard and the smaller settlements of Selsley West and Selsley, all three lying east of King's Stanley along the minor road towards Stroud.

The settlements are on the south side of the valley of the River Frome. In the south of the parish the land rises steeply, and the high plateau south of Selsley is known as Selsley Common.

== History ==
In the Domesday Book of 1086, an estate called Stantone is recorded as held by Turstin FitzRolf. The name "Stanley" derives from the Saxon words for "stone" and "clearing", with the likely etymological source of the name being the use of stone within construction in the village. The prefix "King's" was added to the name by the year 1236, due to the prior ownership of the locale by the crown in the period 1160-1188, and to distinguish from the neighbouring Leonard Stanley.

The Stanley Mills woollen mill in the north of the parish, on the Frome opposite Ryeford, was built in the early 19th century. Its principal building is Grade I listed.

== Amenities ==
Marling Close, which contains the local playing fields on which the cricket and football teams play, was donated to the village by local magnates The Marlings who also helped found Marling School, and is now in the care of the Marling Trust. The village is home to the oldest Baptist Church in Gloucestershire that started meeting in 1640.

The 12th-century parish church of St George at King's Stanley is a Grade I listed building. The 19th-century All Saints Church at Selsley has stained glass by Morris & Co. and is also Grade I listed.

King's Stanley is home to a C of E Primary School, established by amalgamating the Infant and Junior Schools on the site of the old Junior School. The Primary School was inspected by Ofsted in October 2009, and judged to be "Outstanding". In 2013, the school was rated "Inadequate". In 2024 it was rated "Good".

== Notable people ==
- Anthony Keck, 18th-century architect who had his workshops at King's Stanley throughout his life and is buried in St. George's in the village.
- Sir Charles Murray Marling (1862–1933), diplomat and ambassador, was born at King's Stanley.
- Damien Kay, lead singer of The Outcast Band.
