= Stroud (Midland) railway station =

Former railway station in England

Stroud

General information
- Location: Stroud, Stroud; England
- Coordinates: 51.7428°N 2.2207°W
- Grid reference: SO848049
- Platforms: 1

Other information
- Status: Disused

History
- Original company: Midland Railway
- Pre-grouping: Midland Railway
- Post-grouping: London, Midland and Scottish Railway

Key dates
- 1 July 1886: Opened
- 1 January 1917: Closed
- 29 January 1917: Reopened
- 16 June 1947: Last passenger train
- 8 June 1949: Official closure for passengers
- 1966: closed for goods
Location

Stroud railway station (unofficially known as Stroud Wallbridge) served the town of Stroud, in Gloucestershire, England. The station was on a short 1 1/4-mile (2.0 km) branch from Dudbridge on the Stonehouse and Nailsworth Railway, part of the Midland Railway. It was not connected to the earlier and still used Stroud railway station on the Great Western Railway.

Dudbridge had opened as "Dudbridge for Stroud" with the Stonehouse and Nailsworth Railway in 1867. The railway was quickly taken over by the Midland, whose main line between Bristol and Gloucester it joined at Stonehouse. In 1885, the Midland Railway built a short branch line from Dudbridge to a new station at Stroud. The new line opened for goods traffic in 1885 and for passengers on 1 July 1886.

The station at Stroud was perched on a high embankment above the Thames and Severn Canal. The building was wooden and was described at the opening to passenger traffic as "temporary", though it lasted throughout the station's life and beyond. Goods traffic was always more important than passenger traffic at the station, and there was a large goods yard to the east of the passenger platforms.

The station was always officially known simply as "Stroud", but to distinguish it from the nearby GWR station, various publications referred to it as either "Stroud Wallbridge" or "Stroud Cheapside"; the latter name is used in the April 1910 edition of Bradshaw's Railway Guide. That 1910 timetable shows the journey between Dudbridge and Stroud taking an average of five minutes, with fewer than 10 trains a day, a few of them directly running to or from Stonehouse. The station closed temporarily on 1 January 1917, reopening four weeks later on 29 January.

The Stonehouse and Nailsworth Railway, along with the rest of the Midland Railway, became part of the London Midland and Scottish Railway at the 1923 Grouping. Passenger services were suspended on the line as an economy measure to save fuel in June 1947, and were officially withdrawn from 8 June 1949. The station remained open for goods traffic until 1966, though much of the freight had transferred to the former Great Western station. The station buildings have now been demolished and are covered by the town's ring road.

== Services ==
Preceding station	Disused railways	Following station
Dudbridge; Line and station closed	Midland Railway; Stonehouse and Nailsworth Railway	Terminus
