= The Outcast Band =

UK musical group

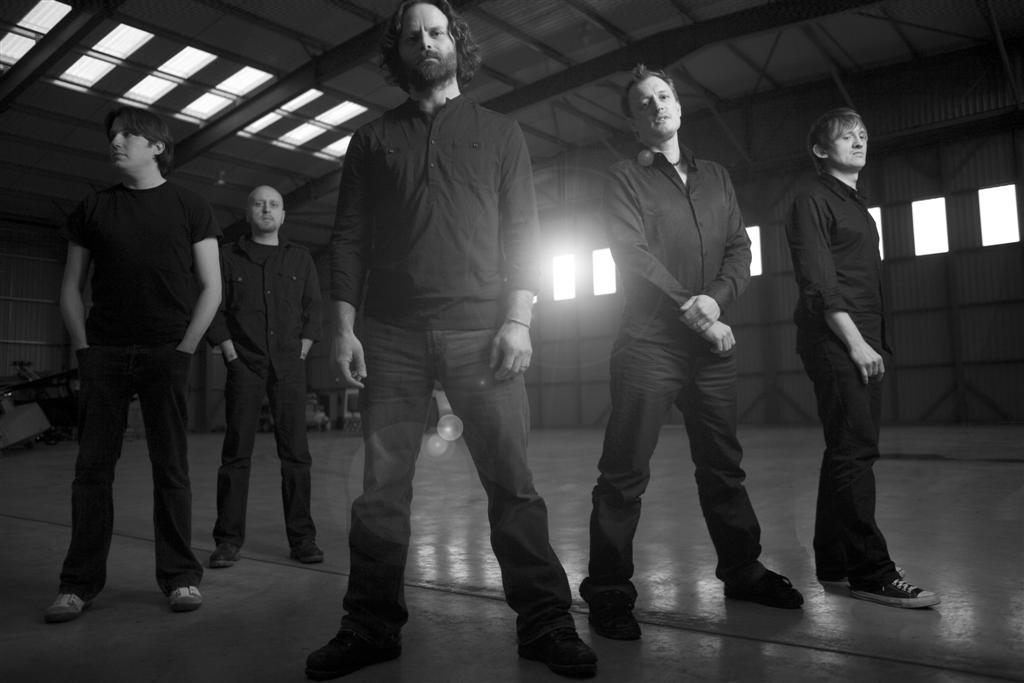

Background information
- Origin: Stroud, Gloucestershire, England
- Genres: Alternative rock, folk rock
- Years active: 1991–1996; 2008–present
- Label: Thirsty Dog Records
- Members: Damien Kay; Paul Godfrey; Tom Price; John Forrester; Matt White; Helen Leask
- Past members: Dave Browne; Miffy Davies; Phil Mills; Ryan Daniel; Mike Agate; Mark Edwards; Jake Gosling; George Whitfield; Dominic Coles
- Website: outcastband.co.uk

The Outcast Band are a folk-rock band from Stroud, Gloucestershire. The band have played over 500 shows to audiences from London to Berlin, at festivals including Glastonbury, Guilfest, Wychwood, Trowbridge, The Acoustic Festival of Britain, and Heineken Big Tops, as well as a 52 date UK university tour and a number of European festivals.

The band toured extensively in the 1990s, including on the festival circuit, and have been reported as one of the biggest bands on local scenes at that time. Following a break in 1996, they reformed in 2008 with a new lineup. The band plays regularly in their hometown of Stroud, and are known to pull large crowds when headlining the Fringe Festival. The band are represented by Eden Music Management.

== The Longest Mile ==
In December 2009, the band met with record producer Phil Tennant, who is known for producing albums for artists such as The Levellers, The Waterboys, and The Saw Doctors, and for discovering Pixie Lott. After listening to demo tracks, Tennant agreed to produce their next album. Tennant and the band recorded the album, The Longest Mile, at Rockfield Studios in Wales with engineer, Adam Whittaker.

The album was released in November 2010, after reported high anticipation with it reaching #2 on the Amazon pre-order chart. The first single from the album was "Orphans".

The Longest Mile has been reviewed as "an ambitious record that creates a dark and brooding atmosphere, contrasted by lighter and sweeter moments. Featuring distinctive vocals, raw folk instrumentals, and fresh, poetic lyrics". In the review by Paul Kerr for Maverick Magazine, he stated that The Longest Mile was "an album to be listened to with the seatbelt strapped on".

== Personnel ==
- Damien Kay – vocals, guitar, mandolin
- Paul Godfrey – violin, mandolin
- Tom Price - guitar, mandolin
- John Forrester - bass guitar, vocals
- Matt White - drums
- Helen Leask - Accordion, Piano, Hammond

== Discography ==
=== Albums ===
- 10 Songs (demo, 1992 - Sticky Songs)
- The Devil's Road (1993 - Art & Soul OUTCD002)
- The Longest Mile (2010 - Thirsty Dog Records)
- Anchors, Mermaids & Sails (2026 - Thirsty Dog Records)

=== Singles and EPs ===
- "Face The Rain" (1995 - Art & Soul OUTCD004)
- "Orphans" (2010)
