= Hampton (car) =

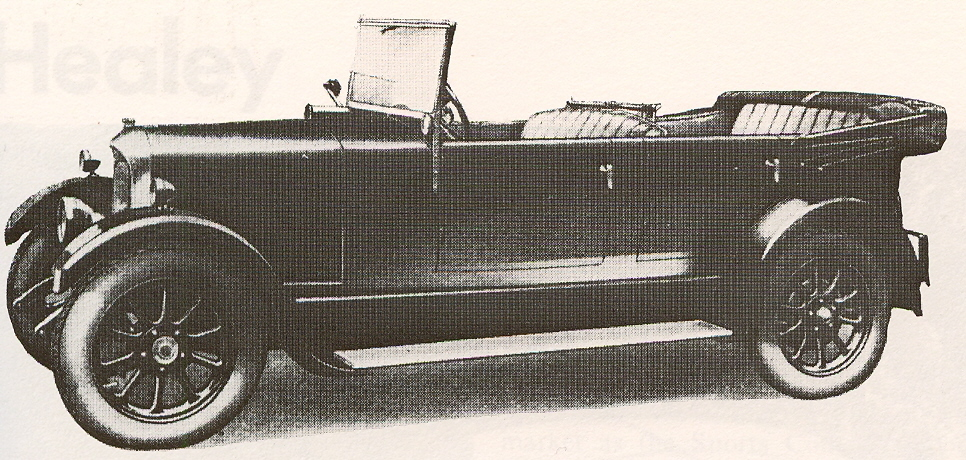
A Hampton auto, c. 1928

The Hampton was a British car made by the Hampton Engineering Company, which was based in Kings Norton, Birmingham, from 1912 to 1918 and at Dudbridge in Stroud, Gloucestershire, from 1918 to 1933.

== Early history ==
The company was founded by William Paddon who lived in Hampton-in-Arden, Warwickshire, where he sold cars and offered to manufacture light cars and motorcycles. In 1912 the Crowdy car company of Birmingham failed and the remains of that company were merged with Hampton Engineering and production moved to Kings Norton. The Crowdy 12/14 was fitted with a larger 1726 cc engine to become the Hampton 12/16. A belt driven cyclecar, apparently designed by Paddon, the Hampton 8 with 968 cc V-twin-cylinder air-cooled engine joined the range in 1913 followed in 1914 by the Hampton 10, a 1244 cc water-cooled version with shaft drive.

Production stopped with the outbreak of World War I, and the company went into receivership in 1915.

== Post war ==
In 1919 the company was re-established as a joint venture between William Paddon and Charles Apperley of the Stroud Metal and Plating Company and production was transferred to Dudbridge, Stroud. The first post war car was the Hampton 11.9 with either a 1496 cc or 1795 cc Dorman four-cylinder engine but only a few were made before the money ran out and the company was bought by a major shareholder John Daniel and re-registered as Hampton Engineering Co (1920) Ltd. William Paddon left to join the Autocrat car company of Birmingham.

William Millward who had been with Charron-Laycock joined as Works manager and designer in 1923 and John Leno, son of music hall star Dan Leno became sales manager. In spite of sales of around 300 cars a year, Hampton failed again in 1924 but was reformed by Millward and Leno as the Stroud Motor Manufacturing Co. Ltd. A new, larger, model the Hampton 14, still with a 1496 cc engine, but now from Henry Meadows, was announced.

In 1925 a receiver was appointed again, but Hampton bounced back as Hampton Cars (London) Ltd with finance from businessman John Hatton-Hall.

The company moved to smaller premises at Selsley Hill and introduced a more up-market three-litre car with Meadows six-cylinder engine alongside the old 14 which was now called the 12/40 or with smaller 1247 cc engine, the Nine. This did not help finances and the receiver was in again in 1930.

Hampton rose again now registered as the Safety Suspension Car Co. Fifty Straight 8 2496 cc engines and 100 chassis were ordered from Rohr of Germany to make the Empire Sportsman model. The spare 50 chassis were to be fitted with Continental 2414 cc six-cylinder engines. One or two at most were made before the company failed for the last time and closed in 1933.

During its history, Hampton made about 1100 cars. Five cars are thought to survive.

== Hampton Cars ==
=== Hampton 12/16 ===
Hampton 12/16

Overview
- Manufacturer: Hampton Engineering Company
- Production: 1912–1915

Body and chassis
- Body style: open tourer

Powertrain
- Engine: four-cylinder 1726 cc

Dimensions
- Wheelbase: 108 inches (2743 mm)
- Length: 156 inches (3962 mm)

The 12/16 was a design obtained from the failed Crowdy car company fitted with a new side-valve engine. The company brochure shows an open tourer model priced at GBP295.

=== Hampton 8 ===
Hampton 8

Overview
- Manufacturer: Hampton Engineering Company
- Production: 1913–1914
- Designer: William Paddon

Body and chassis
- Class: Cyclecar
- Body style: open

Powertrain
- Engine: two-cylinder 968 cc air-cooled

The Hampton 8 was a lightweight Cyclecar with two-cylinder engine bought in from Precision. The car had belt drive to the ear wheels.

=== Hampton 10 ===
Hampton 10
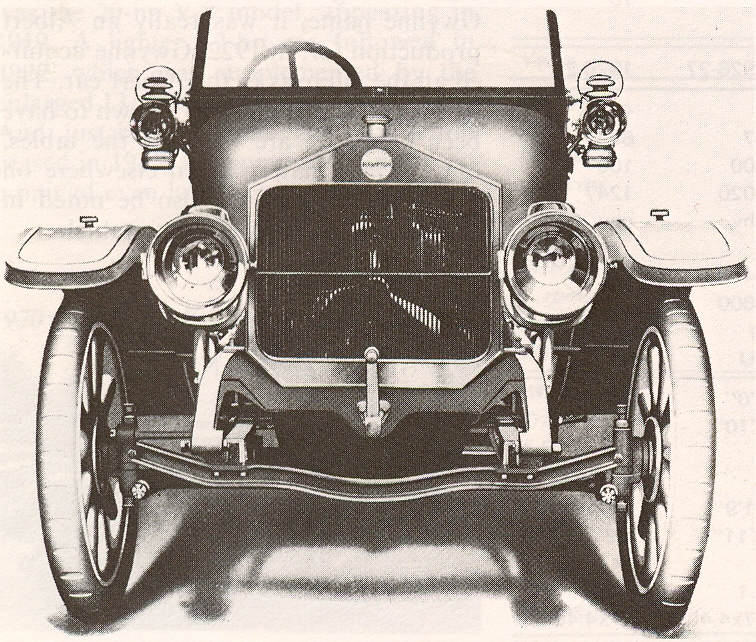

Overview
- Manufacturer: Hampton Engineering Company
- Production: 1914
- Designer: William Paddon

Body and chassis
- Class: Light Car

Powertrain
- Engine: four-cylinder 1244 cc water-cooled

The Hampton 10 was offered for one year only and had a four-cylinder engine from either Ballot or Chapuis-Dornier.

=== Hampton 10/16 ===
Hampton 10/16

Overview
- Manufacturer: Hampton Engineering Company
- Production: 1919–1922 approx 350 made
- Designer: William Paddon

Powertrain
- Engine: four-cylinder 1496 or 1795 cc water-cooled
- Transmission: three-speed

Dimensions
- Wheelbase: 108 inches (2743 mm)
- Length: 138 or 150 inches (3505 or 3810 mm)

This model had a variety of names, the 9.8, 10/16, 11.9 and 11/35. The 10/16 had a 1496 cc and the 11.9 and 11/35 a 1795 cc four-cylinder engine both bought in from Dorman. Although both models shared the same chassis the larger-engined car was longer overall by 12 inches (3050 mm).

The standard body built by Hampton was an open two-seater available in dark biscuit or lavender and priced at GBP520. The suspension used semi-elliptic leaf springs at the front and three-quarter elliptic at the rear.

Several of the cars were used in motor sport competition.

=== Hampton 14 ===
Hampton 14

Overview
- Manufacturer: Hampton Engineering Company (1920); Stroud Motor Manufacturing Co (from 1924)
- Production: 1923–1929 approx 500 made including 9/21 model

Powertrain
- Engine: four-cylinder 1496 cc water-cooled
- Transmission: three-speed

Dimensions
- Wheelbase: 108 inches (2743 mm)
- Length: 138 or 150 inches (3505 or 3810 mm)

The 14 was a larger-engined and longer version of the 9/21 with the engine now made by Henry Meadows, but probably to the Dorman design used previously. The gearbox now had four speeds. The suspension used half-elliptic springs on both axles.

A tourer cost GBP500 in 1923 but the price fell over the years to GBP315. A supercharger was possibly an option on some of the late cars, showing Hampton still had sporting interests.

=== Hampton nine ===
Hampton Nine

Overview
- Manufacturer: Hampton Engineering Company (1920); Stroud Motor Manufacturing Co (from 1924)
- Production: 1923–1931 approx 500 made including 14 model

Powertrain
- Engine: four-cylinder 1247 cc water-cooled
- Transmission: four-speed

Dimensions
- Wheelbase: 96 inches (2438 mm)
- Length: 138 inches (3505 mm)

The Nine, also called the Junior, T10, 9/21 or 10 was a smaller version of the 14 with a shorter chassis.

=== Hampton 20 ===
Hampton 20

Overview
- Manufacturer: Hampton Cars (London) Ltd
- Production: 1929–1933

Powertrain
- Engine: six-cylinder 2414 cc water-cooled
- Transmission: four-speed

Dimensions
- Wheelbase: 120 inches (3048 mm)
- Length: 162 inches (4115 mm)

The 20 was the first of a new range of larger cars with a Meadows engine and twin Zenith carburettors. It was also available with a German Röhr eighth cylinder engine of 2262 cc as the 8/18 model.

Tourer and saloon bodies were available from GBP450.

Few cars, probably less than 100 were made.

=== Hampton 3-litre ===
Hampton 3-litre

Overview
- Manufacturer: Safety Suspension Car Company
- Production: 1929–1931

Powertrain
- Engine: six-cylinder 2931 cc water-cooled
- Transmission: four-speed

This model was possibly a rebranding of the 20 with larger Meadows engine.

=== Hampton Eight/Empire Sportsman ===
Hampton Eight or Empire Sportsman

Overview
- Manufacturer: Safety Suspension Car Company
- Production: 1930–1933

Powertrain
- Engine: eight-cylinder 2496 cc or six-cylinder 2414 cc water-cooled
- Transmission: four-speed

Dimensions
- Wheelbase: 130 inches (3302 mm)
- Length: 168 inches (4267 mm)
- Width: 72 inches (1828 mm)

The final model used a Röhr chassis with independent suspension all round. At the front a transverse leaf spring was used. Servo brakes were fitted. The eight-cylinder engine was also by Röhr, but the six was probably a Continental unit.

Although 50 of the eight-cylinder engine were ordered, it is thought that very few cars were made.

== See also ==
- List of car manufacturers of the United Kingdom
