= Bow-V-Car =

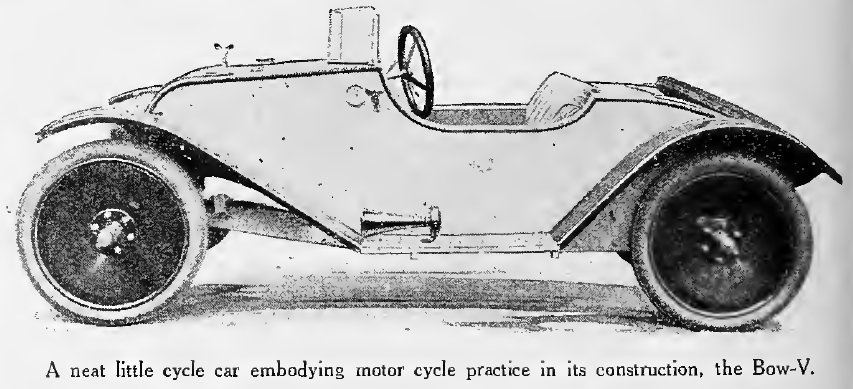
- The Bow-V car from Motor Cycle magazine 1922

Overview
- Manufacturer: Plycar Company
- Production: 1922–1923
- Assembly: Upper Norwood, London, UK
- Designer: Charles Frederick Beauvais

Body and chassis
- Class: Cyclecar
- Body style: Two seat open tourer
- Layout: Rear-engine, rear-wheel-drive layout

Powertrain
- Engine: Precision air-cooled V-twin engine, kick start
- Transmission: Jardine four speed gearbox

Dimensions
- Wheelbase: 2,133.6 mm (84 in)
- Width: 1,295.4 mm (51 in)

The Bow-V-Car was an English cyclecar manufactured from 1922 to 1923 by the Plycar Company of Church Road, Upper Norwood, London. The car was designed by Charles Frederick Beauvais who was later better known as a stylist working for coachbuilders New Avon Body Company.

It had an integral chassis/body made largely of plywood, with a tubular frame at the rear for the engine and transmission. The engine was a rear-mounted, air-cooled (fan-assisted), 10 hp vee-twin engine made by Precision and equipped with a Degory carburetor. Transmission was via a four speed Jardine gearbox. Final drive to the rear axle was by chain, the rear chain tension being adjusted by moving the axle in the frame. A lever offered a combined exhaust lifter and connection by rod to a "kick-starter". As regards the brake and clutch pedals the pivot point can be moved so as to adjust the leverage to suite the driver. The brakes (on two wheels) were of external contracting type.

Cantilever springs were supplied for the suspension with rubber buffers to further lessen road shocks. The engine and transmission were unsprung weight, Each car was provided with 5 of 650 by 65mm Lynton disc wheels. The wheelbase was 7 ft, the track 3 ft 5in, and the overall width 4 ft 3in. With two seat open body the car was advertised in 1922 at £180 (£200 with lighting set). Very few were made.

== See also ==
- List of car manufacturers of the United Kingdom
