= Selsley =

Village in Gloucestershire, England

Coordinates: 51.731°N 2.247°W

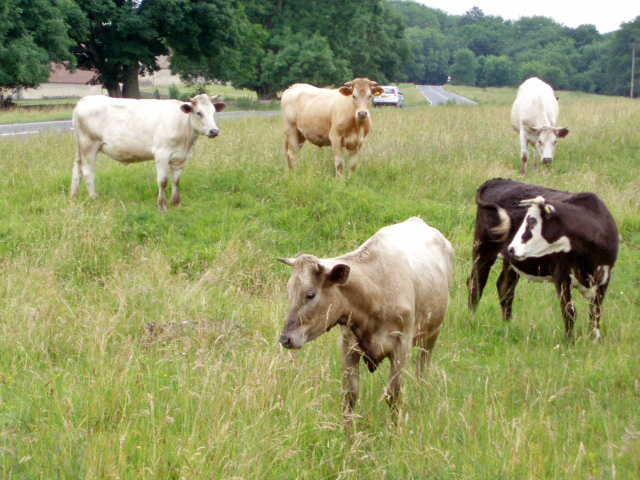
- Selsley Common

- Location within Gloucestershire
- Civil parish: King's Stanley
- District: Stroud
- Shire county: Gloucestershire
- Region: South West
- Country: England
- Sovereign state: United Kingdom
- Police: Gloucestershire
- Fire: Gloucestershire
- Ambulance: South Western

Selsley is a village within the civil parish of King's Stanley and district of Stroud, in Gloucestershire, England. It is composed of around 175 houses, scattered around the western and eastern edge of a Cotswold spur, located approximately 2 miles (3.2 km) south of Stroud.

== History and notable events ==
Selsley Common is an ancient place, but the name Selsley was only used for the settlement after the parish was created in 1863, with the village divided into Selsley West and Selsley. Previously Selsley West was a series of hamlets known as Stanley End, Picked (or Peaked) Elm and The Knapp, with The Knapp east of present day Middleyard, Stanley End closer to the modern Selsley village, and Picked Elm the houses near Peaked Elm Farm.

Stanley Park in Selsley was the destination of pioneering Oxford balloonist, James Sadler, on the first ever flight from Stroud on 19 October 1785. It was estimated that the flight was watched by forty thousand people.

Selsley made the news again when the Common was the site of a Chartist rally, attended by five thousand people, on Tuesday 21 May 1839.

== Houses ==
Stanley Park is an estate and grand house in Selsley dating from the time of Elizabeth I. The house was rebuilt in the mid-18th century and then further remodelled when it was bought by Samuel Marling in 1850. In 1952, the house and estate was sold by auction by the Marling family in 54 lots. Lot 1 was the so called 'Mansion House' which was by then already divided into flats. It is a grade two listed building. Now the Stanley Park postal address is limited to only those dozen or so households sited within the walls and accessed via a fine listed archway entrance

Elsewhere in the village, architecture indicates that most of the older housing dates from the 18th and 19th century, interspersed with 20th-century build.

== Ancient pathways and tracks ==
Running through the village is Water Lane - a prehistoric track that winds its way to North Woodchester and thence to South Woodchester and on to Bath. In parts, its banks tower ten feet overhead, cloaked by hedges of hawthorn, blackthorn, ash and beech. Spring water rushes along the two sides of the lane where the geology changes. It runs parallel to a track continuing from Bell Lane and going past a cottage down over the brook and onto the Villiers estate in Woodchester.

== Geography and geology ==
The western scarp face falls hundreds of feet to the flat Severn Valley. Beyond the Forest lie the Black Mountains and beyond these the Brecon Beacons. Also located on the scarp is a Bronze Age barrow.

== Church of All Saints ==
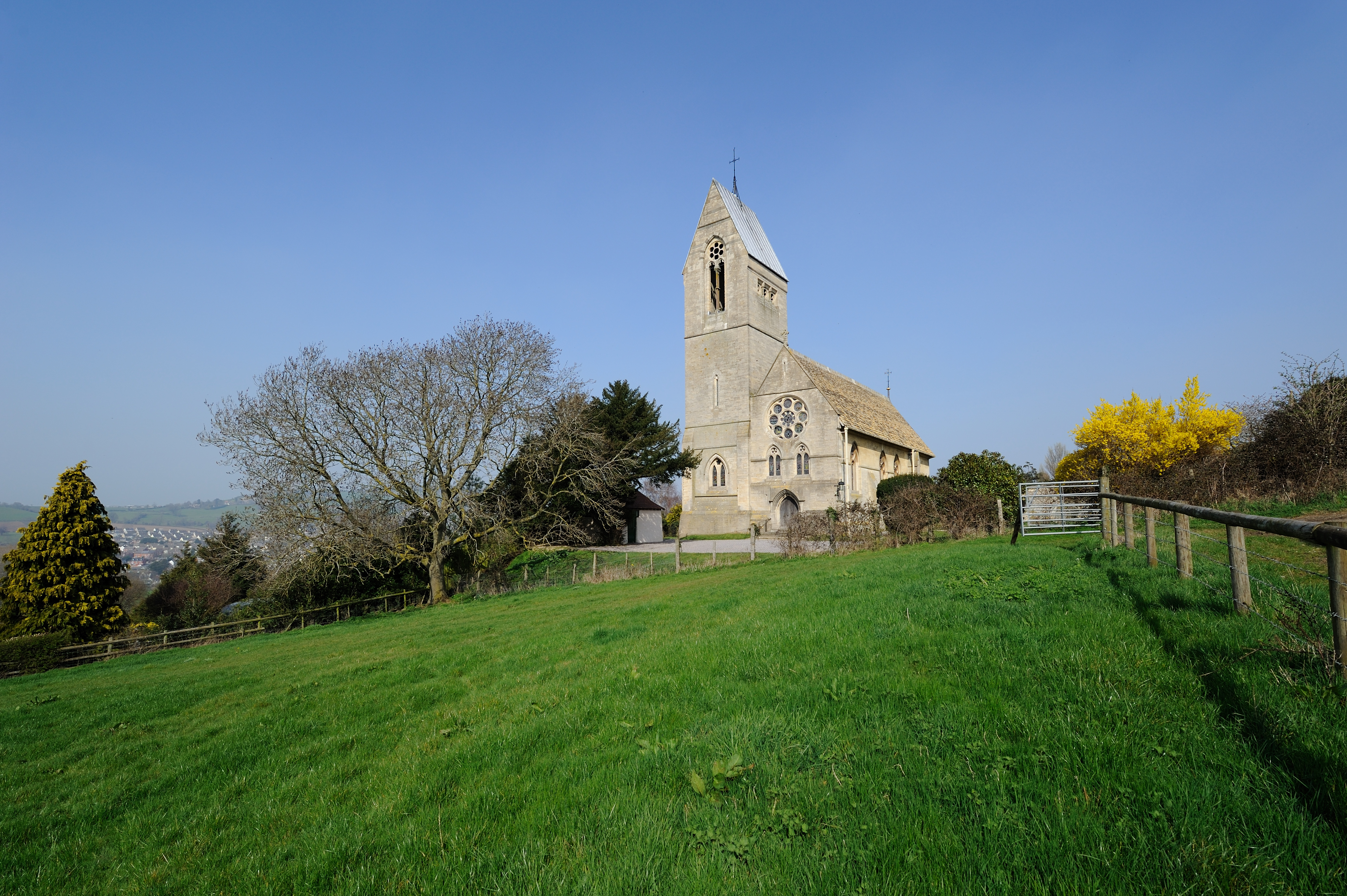
Selsley Church

Alongside the manor house lies Selsley Church, commissioned by the Marling family during the mid-19th century and modelled by Bodley in the French Gothic style. Its stained glass was one of the first commissions undertaken by William Morris and his partners Rossetti, Webb, Ford Madox Brown and Burne-Jones. The design of the church derives from the squire's name. The church is modelled on one seen in Marling in the disputed area of the Italian Tyrol.

One of the names on the village's War Memorial is Ernest Rigsby, who died in the First World War. He is also commemorated on a plaque inside the church. Corporal F.E. Rigsby was from the neighbouring village of Woodchester and is also remembered on the local war memorial there. His special recognition in Selsley comes from his engagement to the then vicar's daughter, Gabrielle West. The Selsley memorial refers to him by his second name, which was only used by his family and those close to him.

== Selsley Common ==
=== History ===
Despite attempts to enclose the common at Selsley, it has been vigorously defended over the years. The first recorded dispute was in the Saxon period, and the threat to enclose the common in the 19th century met with vocal public outrage. There is one area which did become enclosed, known locally as 'Dead Man's Acre'. The story goes that a man was told that he could have as much land of the common that he could enclose in one day. The effort though, proved too much, and killed him. The truth of this tale is dubious, as it bears similarities to works of fiction such as Leo Tolstoy's How Much Land Does a Man Need?

Dotted over the common are the long abandoned remains of quarries once used to supply stone for local building and walling. Lesser hollows are the remains of a medieval soldier's camp - so identified in 1942 by Captain H.S. Gracie. In addition, the grassed-over ways used by the quarry wagons can still be seen.

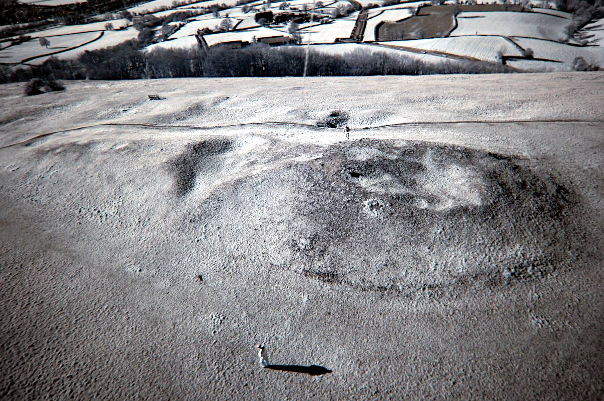
An oblique near infrared kite aerial photo of the long barrow on Selsley Common, The Toots. https://historicengland.org.uk/listing/the-list/list-entry/1002131

=== Site of Special Scientific Interest ===
Selsley Common
- Site of Special Scientific Interest
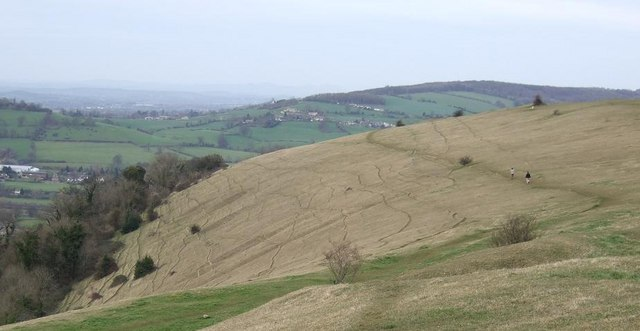
- Selsley Common
- Location of Selsley Common.
- Area of search: Gloucestershire
- Grid reference: SO829030
- Interest: Biological/Geological
- Area: 39.4 ha (97 acres)
- Notification date: 1966

Selsley Common (grid reference SO829030) is a 39.4-hectare (97-acre) biological and geological Site of Special Scientific Interest in Gloucestershire, notified in 1966. It is a large open expanse and a rich habitat for rare flora and fauna. During the summer, bird song mingles with the sound of cattle as commoners can, and still do, exercise grazing rights.

The common and village are in the Cotswold Area of Outstanding Natural Beauty and overlies the Jurassic limestone of the Cotswolds. It supports herb-rich calcareous grassland habitat. Leigh's Quarry, which is in the southern part of the SSSI, is of particular geological significance.

The site is listed in the 'Stroud District' Local Plan, adopted November 2005, Appendix 6 (online for download) as an SSSI and a Regionally Important Geological Site (RIGS).

==== Geology ====
The quarry provides one of the most extensive, and thus significant, cross-sections of the Middle Jurassic Inferior Oolite in the south of the Cotswolds. Oolite Marl, Upper Trigonia Grit and Clypeus Grit are in the succession. This is a site with a notable example of hardground, which is a thin layer of rough limestone formed during environmental changes.

==== Biology ====
The grassland is dominated by grasses such as upright brome, sheep's fescue, and there is little tor-grass. The latter makes the common different from others in the region. Herbs include rock-rose, common bird's-foot-trefoil, salad burnet and wild thyme. Orchids are in abundance including autumn lady's tresses, green-winged orchid and fragrant orchid, particularly in the quarry areas. There are scrub areas of hawthorn and there some trees such as ash.

The habitat supports a range of invertebrates including the mollusc Abida secale, and butterflies. The latter include small blue, grayling and Duke of Burgundy fritillary.
