= Stonehouse and Nailsworth Railway =

Former railway line in Gloucestershire, England

The Stonehouse and Nailsworth Railway was a short railway line in the county of Gloucestershire, England. It was promoted independently to connect the industrial town of Nailsworth to the main line railway network at Stonehouse. It opened in 1867, but was immediately in financial difficulty, due largely to debenture interest payments and other financial commitments from the construction.

The Midland Railway purchased the line in 1868. They later decided to build a short branch line from Dudbridge to Stroud, and that opened in 1885.

The passenger service was suspended in 1947 as a response to the post-war national fuel emergency, but the suspension was shortly made a permanent closure. The local goods service continued until 1966 from which time the line was completely closed.

== Proposals and construction ==
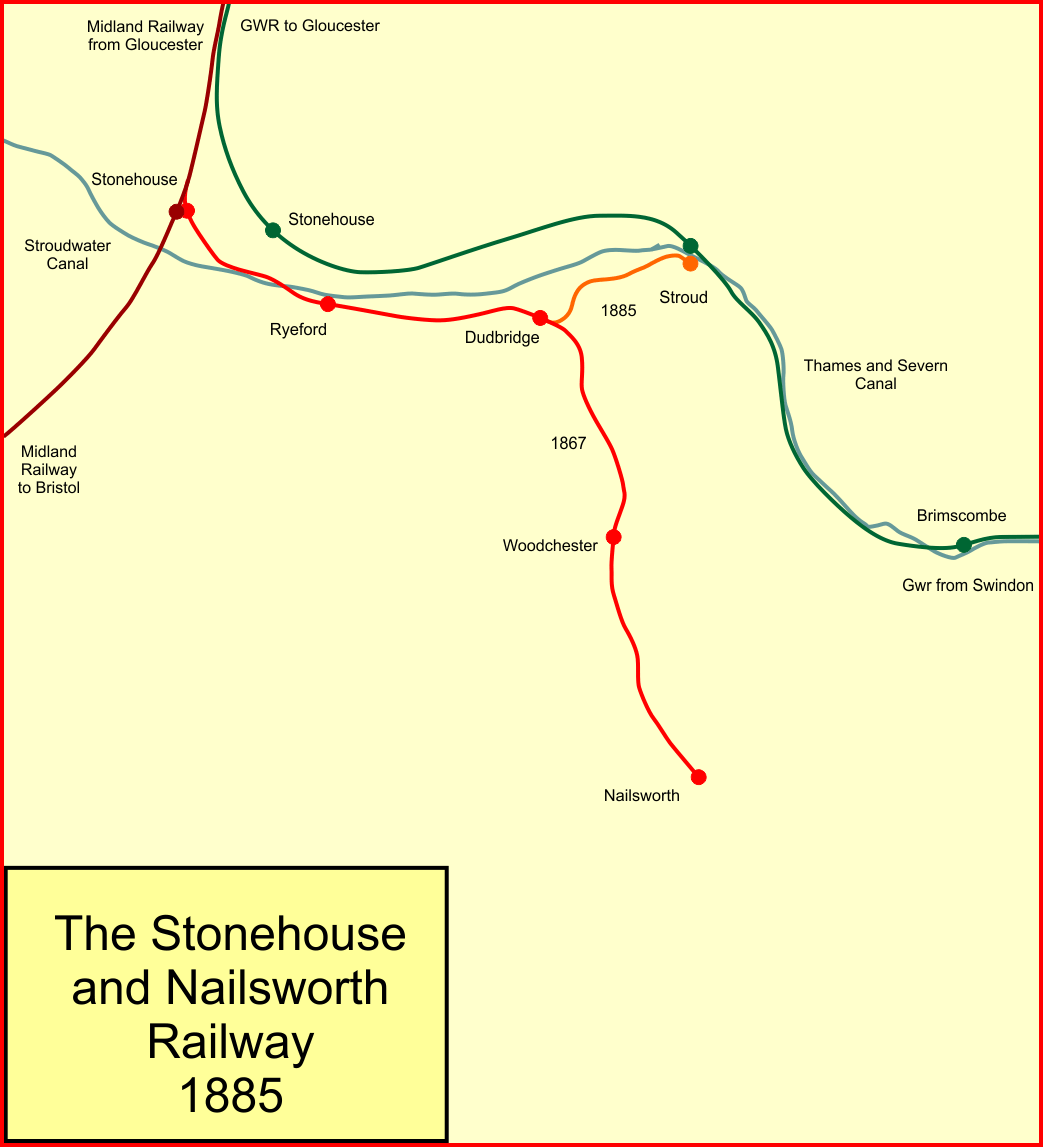
The Nailsworth and Stroud branches

The Stroudwater Navigation was opened in 1779, bringing cheap transportation to Stroud for imports, especially coal and agricultural requirements, and exports of the manufactures of the district. The Thames and Severn Canal followed in 1789, offering a direct connection to London.

The Bristol and Gloucester Railway opened its main line in 1844, passing to the west of Nailsworth and Stroud, and the Great Western Railway opened its line through Stroud in 1845, bringing further benefits. However it was observed that Nailsworth, being somewhat further from the line, suffered a disadvantage compared with its rival town of Stroud.

Stonehouse and Nailsworth Railway Act 1863
- Act of Parliament
- Parliament of the United Kingdom
- Long title: An Act for making a Railway from the Bristol and Birmingham Line of the Midland Railway at Stonehouse to Nailsworth in the County of Gloucester.
- Citation: 26 & 27 Vict. c. cxxxii

Dates
- Royal assent: 13 July 1863

Text of statute as originally enacted

Stonehouse and Nailsworth Railway Act 1865
- Act of Parliament
- Parliament of the United Kingdom
- Long title: An Act to authorize the Stonehouse and Nailsworth Railway Company to extend their Railway from Dudbridge to the Great Western Railway at Stroud; and for other Purposes relating to the same Company.
- Citation: 28 & 29 Vict. c. clxxvii

Dates
- Royal assent: 29 June 1865

Text of statute as originally enacted

In 1862 it was proposed to build a branch railway from Stonehouse on the former Bristol and Gloucester Railway line to Nailsworth. The B&GR had now passed into the possession of the Midland Railway. Sufficient support seemed to be forthcoming, and a parliamentary bill went to the 1863 session of Parliament. With little opposition, the bill was passed as the Stonehouse and Nailsworth Railway Act 1863 (26 & 27 Vict. c. cxxxii) on 13 July 1863. Authorised capital was £66,000.

A contract was let for the construction to Watson, Overend & Company, and the first sod was cut on 22 February 1864. The Stroud Journal, in reporting the first sod ceremony, asserted that "it is well understood to be the first step of an extension on through Tetbury, Malmesbury and Chippenham". The support for the line locally was indicated by the fact that the capital for the construction was soon raised, although a heavy commitment in debentures was taken.

Following an easy river valley course, the line was quickly completed, and the necessary Board of Trade inspection took place, in order to obtain permission for passenger operation. Colonel Yolland made the necessary visit in December 1866 but he declined to recommend opening to passengers, chiefly on the ground of there being only one turntable on the line. At the time the Board of Trade policy was to prohibit the running of tender engines tender-first, so requiring a turntable at each end of a line. There seems to have been some failure of communication, for an anguished remark was made that tank engine operation was intended, which seems to have resulted in belated approval.

== Opening ==
Accordingly the line opened for goods trains on 1 February 1867 and passenger trains started running on 4 February 1867.

The line was loss-making from the start; seeing little other means of escaping the difficulty, on 6 November 1867 the company asked the Midland Railway if they would take over the line, but the Midland Railway refused. As well as debenture interest of £450 in the first half year, the company was under pressure from landowners whose land had been taken, but who had not received the agreed purchase price. Moreover the Stroudwater Canal claimed £1,060: an intersection bridge to the west of Ryeford had been built without being compliant with requirements of the Stonehouse and Nailsworth Railway Act 1863, and the canal company was able to show that it had suffered loss. A receiver was appointed, and the Midland Railway fed in financial support in order to keep the Stonehouse and Nailsworth Railway Company going.

Absorption was the only way out of the situation, and the Midland Railway did not wish to see the line closed; meanwhile the shareholders of the Stonehouse and Nailsworth Railway Company had become more realistic in their expectations, and terms were agreed that 3% would be guaranteed to ordinary shareholders (whose holdings amounted to £40,940). The transfer of ownership was authorised on 17 June 1868. The Stroud and Nailsworth Railway Company was now a financial shell only, until it was dissolved, in 1886.

== Under the Midland Railway ==
The Stroud branch had been authorised in the original Stonehouse and Nailsworth Railway Act 1863, but had been considered a lower priority. Now there was pressure in Stroud to build it. Although they had a railway connection, the GWR line, they wished to have access to Nailsworth for their own manufactures. The original authorisation had expired, so the Midland in responding to the pressure, obtained a new act of Parliament, the Midland Railway (Additional Powers) Act 1880 (43 & 44 Vict. c. cxlvi) on 6 August 1880 for the purpose.

The lowest tender for the actual construction was £37,198 for 1 1/4 miles; the earthworks were formidable.

Colonel Rich of the Board of Trade carried out the inspection that was necessary for passenger operation in March 1886, and was satisfied. The line opened for goods operation on 16 November 1885, and passenger trains started running on 1 July 1886.

== Decline ==
Bus competition started to operate, under the company Jeffrey and Company of Nailsworth, from April 1908.

The line was closed to passenger trains on 16 June 1947 as a temporary measure in response to the post-war fuel emergency, but it never resumed, and the passenger operation was formally discontinued on 8 June 1949.

The line closed completely on 1 June 1966.

== Stations ==
The station at Bristol Road, Stonehouse was separated from the main line station there; the two sections were connected by a covered walkway. The intermediate stations were at Ryeford, Dudbridge and Woodchester, all except Woodchester had stone buildings on a large scale.

Dudbridge was originally advertised as "Dudbridge for Stroud", as Stroud was only 1 mile (1.6 km) or so away. In 1885 the Midland Railway opened its Stroud branch, to goods trains only at first; the Stroud station was sometimes known as Stroud Cheapside and Stroud Wallbridge. Passenger services began the following year, 1886, and connected to the main branch line services at Dudbridge.

== Current use ==
Much of the line, including the 3 miles (4.8 km) section from Dudbridge to Nailsworth, is now in use as a cycle path, a section of National Cycle Route 45 from Salisbury to Chester.

== Topography ==
=== Station list: Nailsworth line ===
- Stonehouse; main line station opened 8 July 1844; renamed Stonehouse Bristol Road from 1951; closed 4 January 1965; Nailsworth branch platforms opened 4 February 1867; closed 16 June 1947; also sometimes known as Stonehouse Eastington Road;
- Ryeford; opened 4 February 1867; closed 16 June 1947;
- Dudbridge; opened 4 February 1867; closed 16 June 1947;
- Woodchester; opened 1 July 1867; closed 16 June 1947;
- Nailsworth; opened 4 February 1867; closed 16 June 1947;

=== Stroud branch ===
- Dudbridge; above;
- Stroud; opened 1 July 1886; closed briefly during January 1917; closed 16 June 1947; sometimes known as Stroud Cheapside.
