= Stonehouse, Gloucestershire =

Town in Gloucestershire, England

Coordinates: 51.7478°N 2.2838°W

Stonehouse
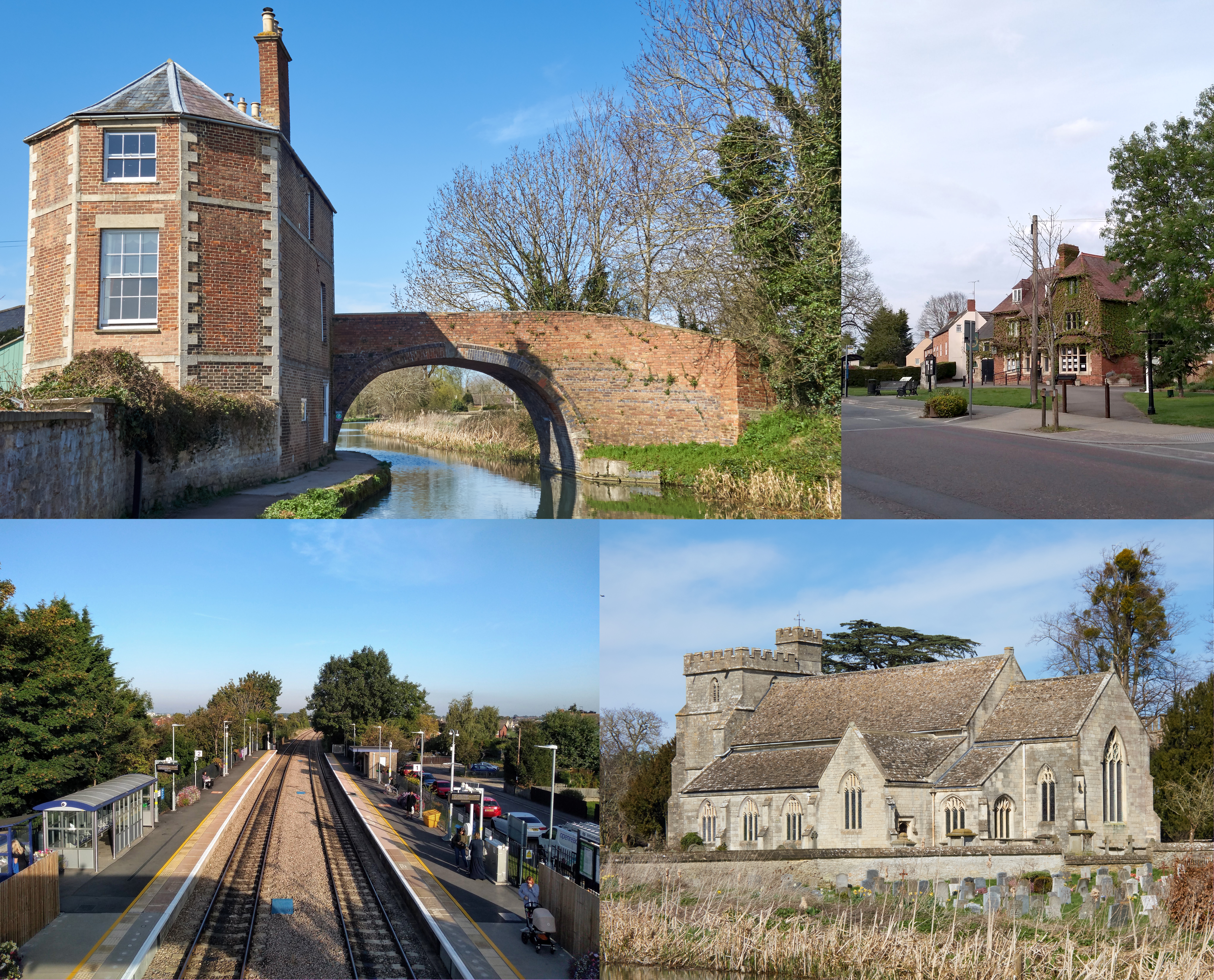
- Clockwise from top-left: Nutshell Bridge on the Stroudwater Navigation, town high street, Church of St Cyr, Stonehouse railway station

- Location within Gloucestershire
- Population: 7,591 (2021 Census)
- OS grid reference: SO805055
- Civil parish: Stonehouse
- District: Stroud
- Shire county: Gloucestershire
- Region: South West
- Country: England
- Sovereign state: United Kingdom
- Post town: STONEHOUSE
- Postcode district: GL10
- Dialling code: 01453
- Police: Gloucestershire
- Fire: Gloucestershire
- Ambulance: South Western
- UK Parliament: Stroud

Stonehouse is a town in the Stroud District of Gloucestershire in southwestern England.

The town centre is 2.5 miles east of the M5 motorway, junction 13. Stonehouse railway station has a regular train service to London.

The town is situated approximately 9 miles south of Gloucester city centre and 4 miles west of central Stroud, though following recent development it is partially contiguous with the Ebley district of Stroud. It includes the sub-villages of Bridgend (to the south) and Ryeford (to the east).

== History ==
=== Stonehouse Manor ===
Stonehouse appears in William the Conqueror's Domesday Book of 1086 under its Old English name “Stanhus” – so called, it is believed, because the manor house was built of stone rather than the usual wattle and daub. William de Ow, a cousin of William the Conqueror, owned the manor lands which included a vineyard, and two mills. The name may have evolved from Stanhus to Stonehouse : stān > stone + hūs > house, as an effect of the Great Vowel Shift at the end of the Middle Ages.

The original manor house was completely rebuilt in 1601. In 1906, Stonehouse Court was bought by Arthur Winterbotham who completely refurbished it to a design by architect Edwin Lutyens. and despite a fire in 1908, that destroyed the new interior of the house leaving only the outer shell and a few original features. Winterbotham had the house restored in a similar fashion. Mr Winterbotham died in 1936, leaving his widow Caroline living there until her death in 1974, when the house was sold and, after a period as business offices, eventually became an hotel in 1983 as Stonehouse Court Hotel. It is located next to St Cyr's Church near the Stroudwater Canal. Stonehouse Court is a listed grade 2 building.

Some of the town's oldest trees are in the grounds of Stonehouse Court.

=== Oldend Hall ===
Oldend Hall was occupied by the Beard family from 1661 to the late 18th century. The house was two-storied and largely stone-faced, its entrance front facing north. The half-H plan consists of a central block and two flanking wings extending southwards. The. west wing is structurally timber-framed and dates from the earlier 17th century. The only exposed framing was along the upper story of the west wall; elsewhere the wing has been stone-faced at various periods. The central block has been more drastically altered, but also formed part of the original timber-framed house; the presence of several re-used smoke-blackened timbers in the roof suggests that it may have contained a medieval open hall before it was remodelled. The house was much altered and enlarged c. 1700. The central block was extended eastwards to include a large chimney which stood against its former gable-end. The east wing, entirely of stone with two gables on the east was added and the north front of the older building was faced with stone ashlar to match it. Features of that period include several mullioned and transomed windows, a central dormer, and the central doorway with its semi-circular hood on shaped brackets. The only internal fitting to survive from the earlier house is a 16th-century door with linen-fold panels. Oldend Hall was demolished in 1977.

==== Notable dates ====
In 1327, one of the manor's masters, John Maltravers, was implicated in the murder of Edward II in Berkeley Castle, and fled abroad. He later found favour with Edward III and the Stonehouse manor was restored to him “by tenure de Marchacia (of the royal Marshalcy) by a rose per annum”. The rose was a symbol of loyalty to the Crown. This may have been the origin of the modern day emblem of Stonehouse – the Tudor rose.

1375–1558 The manor was owned by the Earls of Arundel. The Lord of the Manor did not necessarily live at the house; it would have often have been occupied by a steward or tenant. During this period the manor house was a working court, holding jurisdiction over the whole manor. This is when it became known as Stonehouse Court.

1558 The Court was sold to local clothiers William Fowler and William Sandford. The cloth industry was now becoming the major source of employment in the area.

1601 William Fowler's son Daniel rebuilt the manor house. The date stone over the door is thought to commemorate the new building.

1685 The Court was let to farmers with the owners living in grander places.

1730 The earliest surviving map of the manor lands. A copy of this can be seen in the hotel.

1779 The Stroudwater Canal opened, running through the manor lands.

1810 Court Farm was built.

1847 The Court was owned by the Marling family.

=== Industry ===
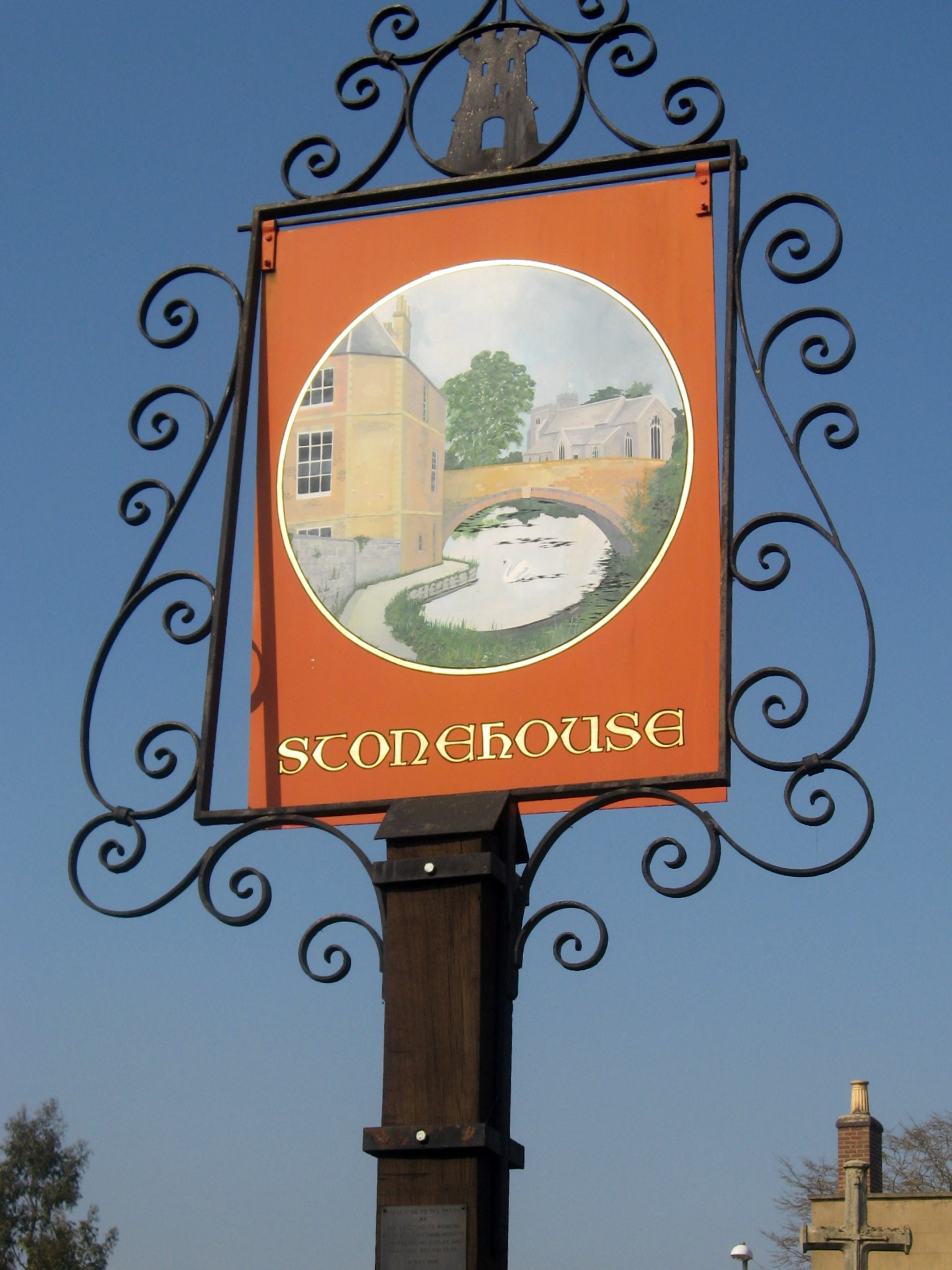
Stonehouse town sign

The woollen industry was important to Stonehouse people, first as producers of wool and later as experts in textiles. The small mills of the 17th and 18th century supported work at home for the growing population of the village, later changing to a factory system. As the textile industry declined, Stonehouse remained a thriving place as smaller businesses of every type took over.

Due to the availability of raw materials in Stonehouse, brickmaking began there in 1856 with evidence of possible prior brickmaking as early as 1839 or 1840 and of as many as thirteen brickmaking sites altogether. The largest and last to close of the brickmakers, Stonehouse Brick and Tile Company Ltd., was located where the Rosedale housing estate now stands. It was founded in 1891, and by 1895 employed a large number of people in making pottery, terra-cotta, and bricks. The company closed in 1968 and the 202-foot high chimney was demolished. Bricks and other materials made by the company were not only used locally (notably in the Stonehouse Post Office, now the Town Hall) and in other areas of Britain, but were also used as far away as Cape Town, Gibraltar, and Buenos Aires, with those used in Gibraltar transported there on the RMS Lusitania during her sea trials. Among the many buildings abroad built from Brick and Tile bricks is the English Clock Tower in Buenos Aires, Argentina, which celebrated its centenary in 2016. Stonehouse History Group sent a commemorative plaque which is now displayed in the Tower.

Stonehouse has a number of business and industrial parks, with the largest of these in Oldends Lane, located off the A419 in the west of the town and is home to the Severnside Dairy for Müller and other large companies including Schlumberger, Renishaw, Delphi Automotive, Lister Shearing and Dairy Partners.

In 2015 a new business park was built at the side of the A419 opposite the town's main industrial estate in Oldends Lane. In 2016 a new eco-business park and wood-based football stadium for Forest Green Rovers was mooted by local businessman Dale Vince, CEO of Ecotricity, to be constructed west of the town, close to the M5 junction. The formal planning application for the stadium was initially refused by Stroud Council in June 2019 but ultimately approved in December 2019.

== Amenities ==
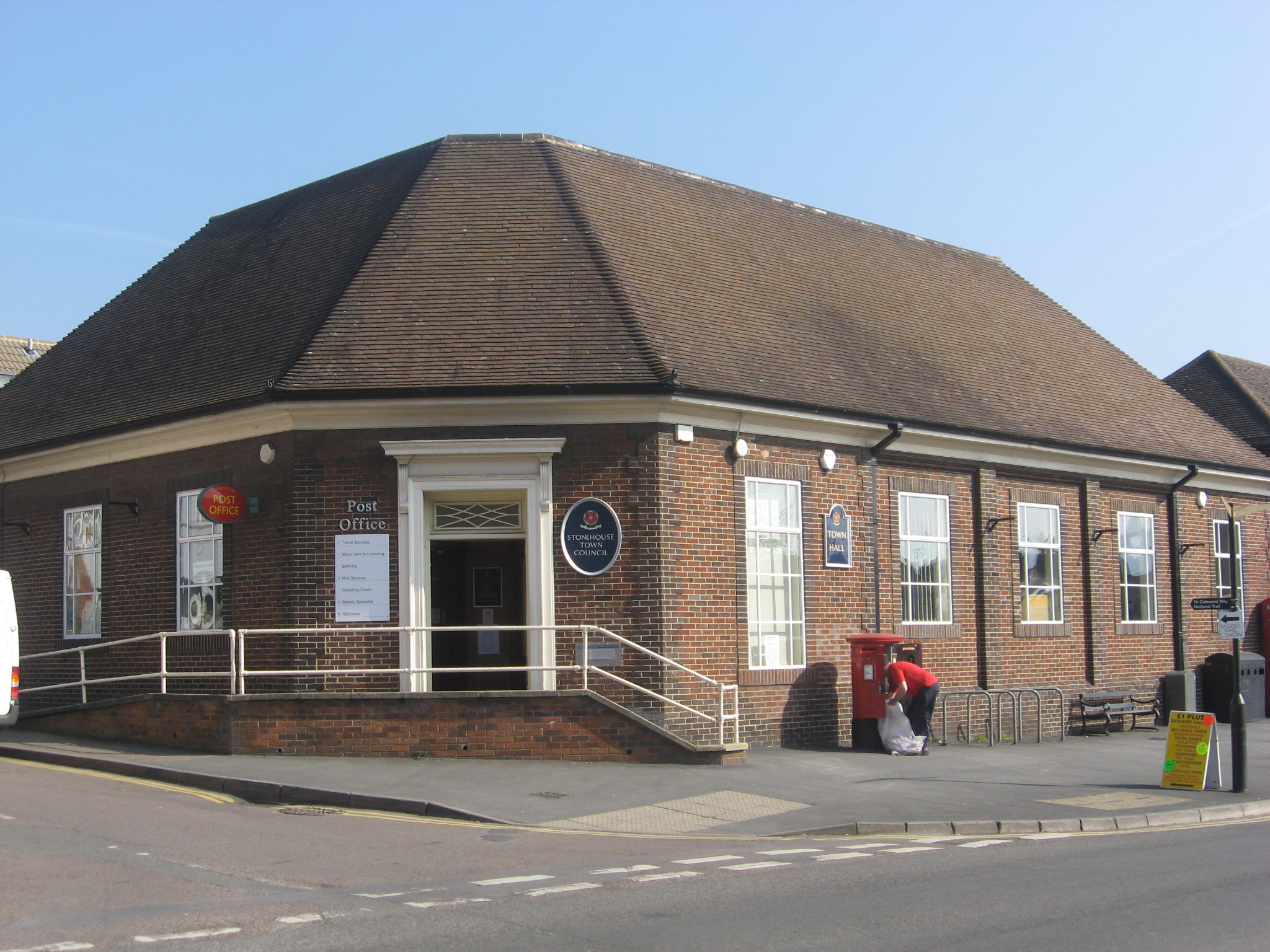
Town Hall

=== Canal ===
From the town, there are a number of footpaths and lanes leading to the nearby canal, Stroudwater Navigation, which passes through the west of the town. On the canal at the rear of Stonehouse Court is Ocean Bridge. This was an iron swing bridge where canal boats would turn. There used to be a repair yard there. The Cotswold Canals Trust are actively restoring the canal. Work is currently underway and plans to also relink it all the way to Saul Junction where it will meet the Gloucester & Sharpness Canal. To achieve this, a new railway bridge was constructed at the 'Ocean' during 2021, a new canal cutting to be constructed under the M5 and remodelling of the A38 roundabout near Fromebridge Mill also completed in 2021 so that boats will, effectively, pass under the roundabout. When all this work is finished, boats may be able to navigate from Saul Junction all the way to the centre of Stroud. Further work is needed to link this from Stroud to the Thames.

The Ocean is an ideal wildlife nesting location and a variety of ducks, swans, herons, kingfishers and moorhens can be seen.

=== Cotswold Way ===
The national trail, Cotswold Way, passes close to Stonehouse.

=== Sport ===
The football club, Stonehouse Town F.C., located at the north of the town, has four teams, with the top one currently playing in the Ulhsport Hellenic League Division 1.

=== Recreation grounds ===
The town has three public recreation grounds, these are Laburnham Playing Field, just west of the High Street, Meadow Road Park, east of the High Street and at Oldends Lane, in the north of the town next to Stonehouse Football Club.

=== Green spaces and nature reserve ===
On the town side of the A419 next to Court View, near the now derelict Stonehouse and Nailsworth Railway is a small nature reserve, fenced off from public access, that contained a colony of great crested newts. Over the years since the estate at Court View has been occupied, the five valleys project were responsible for the reserve and took an annual census of the number of newts. In recent years, the census has stopped and the area remains fenced off without any further count. A plaque at the reserve shows details of wildlife that can be seen there.

=== Pubs ===
In 1838 the whole parish (including Cainscross and Ebley and Westrip) had a total of 33 public houses and beerhouses and in 1891 there were 21 public houses. In the village of Stonehouse in 1901 there were about 14. In 2018 there are two – The Woolpack and The Globe which both date from the early 19th century. The Woolpack Inn is one of the oldest buildings in Stonehouse, developed from 16th-century cottages and barns. It catered for the wool traders and farmers whereas the Crown and Anchor in the middle of the town (now a doctors' surgery) was the main coaching inn where the Bath coach stopped. The Spa Inn on Oldends Lane was one of Stonehouse's oldest public houses, developing from 16th-century cottages. During the 19th century it was selling mineral water from its well and a pump room was added. Gradually the Spa business faded and it became a beerhouse. It was a successful pub during the 20th century, but was closed early in 2013 after a succession of landlords and then sold by the brewery Wadworths in 2014.

=== Media ===
==== Television ====
Local news and television programmes are provided by BBC West and BBC West Midlands on BBC One & ITV West Country and ITV Central on ITV1. Television signals are received from either the Mendip or Ridge Hill TV transmitters.

==== Radio ====
Local radio stations are BBC Radio Gloucestershire, Heart West and Greatest Hits Radio South West.

==== Newspapers ====
The town is served by the local newspaper, Stroud News & Journal.

=== Education ===
==== Primary schools ====
In the town there are two primary schools. Park Infant hosts pupils from reception through to year 2 (age 5 to 7) and has approximately 160 pupils. Park Junior school for pupils between years 3 and 6 (ages 7 to 10) and has approximately 200 pupils. Each school has two classes per year.

==== Secondary schools ====
Maidenhill School, located in the north east of Stonehouse, is the town's comprehensive, 11–16 mixed secondary school. The school has a capacity for 785 pupils.

==== Independent schools ====
Wycliffe College is in the south of the town and spread over two campuses, its Preparatory School campus on Ebley Road, which includes a Nursery school, and large Senior campus close by. One of the school's boarding houses, Haywardsend, is one of the town's oldest buildings, an old Tudor farmhouse. Haywardsfield, an imposing three-story red brick building at the head of the school drive, is the school's oldest boarding house. In addition to trees on the grounds of Stonehouse Court, some of the town's oldest trees are within the college grounds however some of these have been removed in recent years due to disease or weakness considered a factor to pupil safety. Their loss has been off-set by the planting of many new trees throughout the campus.

=== Religious centres ===
The Parish church is St Cyr's Church, named after St Cyriac or St Cyril. The Church sits alongside the canal in the west of the town. St Cyr's Church is one of the oldest buildings in Stonehouse, the tower dating from the 14th century. George Whitefield, the Gloucester-born evangelist, preached here. In addition to its historic burial ground, it also has an active burial ground alongside the canal. Other churches include Stonehouse Methodist Church, St Joseph's Catholic, Stonehouse Baptist Church (meeting at Maidenhill School) and the Bethel Church. Stonehouse Live is a network of Christians bringing all the Churches together in Stonehouse. A Wesleyan chapel was built in 1911 in the grounds of Wycliffe College; although built with money subscribed by those connected with the school and mainly used by the school, it was also the chapel of the local Methodist community. A tower and spire were added in 1921. The chapel was gutted by fire in 1939 and rebuilt in the late 1950s, with much of the stone came from the church at Frocester. Its tower is Grade II listed. The chapel holds popular annual Christmas Carol Services for the school and local community.

=== Governance ===
An electoral ward with the same name exists. The area and population are identical to that of the parish.

=== Police station ===
The nearest Police Station is in Stroud after the Stonehouse police station was closed in late 2011.

=== Transport ===
==== Road ====
Good road communication is provided, with the M5 situated within 2 miles of Stonehouse town centre, with the major industrial area located to the west of the town off the A419. The A419, in the west of the town, is the main artery route connecting both Stonehouse and the Stroud area to the nearby A38 and M5.

The B4008, High Street, is the main road through the town and also serves as a busy commuter route between Stroud and Gloucester, via Quedgeley. In 2011, Stonehouse High Street was made into a Community Shared Space, reopening in September 2011. There are many shops on the High Street, including a medium-sized supermarket. The town's Post Office closed in 2017 and is now incorporated in the supermarket, with the old Post Office now the library. The town now has a free car park just off the High Street and where public toilets are sited.

==== Bus ====
Bus services to Gloucester and Stroud are provided by Stagecoach, with other services to Cam, Dursley and the Stanleys. There are several bus stops throughout the town.

==== Rail ====
The town is served by Stonehouse railway station operated by Great Western Railway on the Golden Valley Line, with a service to London. The station has an east and west platform with a shelter on each, a pedestrian overhead bridge and a small pay-and-display car park. The station has a small ticket office only staffed during peak morning hours, with tickets otherwise purchased via a ticket machine. There is an ongoing campaign to reopen the closed Bristol Road railway station on the Birmingham-Bristol section of the Cross Country route, which would link Stonehouse directly to Bristol and the South West and improve connections to the Midlands. This was hindered by the cancellation of the UK government's "Restoring your Railway" fund in July 2024.

== Growth ==
Stonehouse development was partly due to good communications for transport, In 1779, the Stroudwater Navigation, (now part of the Thames and Severn Canal) was cut and relics of the canal can still be seen. Business increased further when the land was prepared for the opening of the Midland Railway Station in 1844, and the Great Western Railway Station a year later. The Stonehouse and Nailsworth Railway opened a branch to Nailsworth in 1867 and Stroud in 1885.

=== World War 2 ===
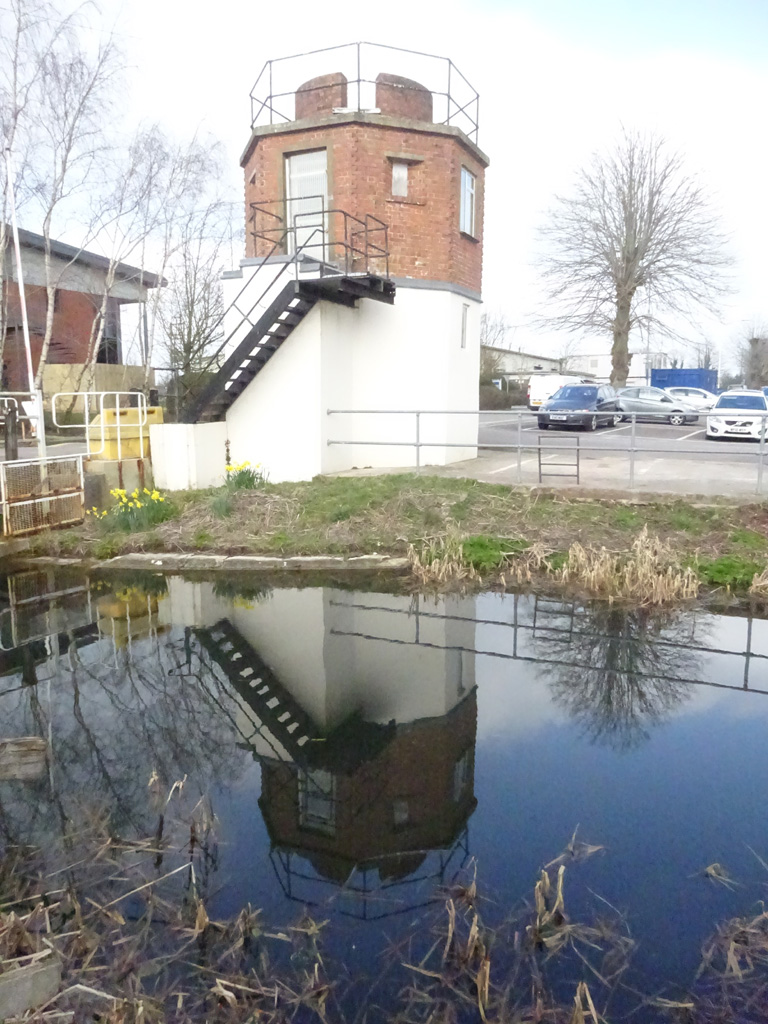
Pillbox

When the threat of war became clear in the late 1930s, the Cotswolds were seen as a suitable location for the dispersement of aerospace shadow factories, being a safe place away from German bombers range. Smiths were co-located to Bishops Cleeve and Stonehouse was chosen as a good place to build factories for the manufacturers Sperry's Gyroscope Company, who moved to Bond's Mill and Hoffmann's Bearings located to Oldends Lane. These two factories employed many people during the war and for a long time afterwards ensuring employment in the town for many years. The Gatehouse at Bonds Mill was originally constructed during World War II as a defensive pillbox. It is a rare example of a two-storey pillbox with a rooftop gun emplacement and is a Grade II listed building. It is now used as a visitor centre run by the Cotswold Canals Trust. Original air-raid shelters still exist nearby, being used as stores. There are the remains of a more conventional pillbox located on the railway at the canal crossing (2021) which may not survive the new bridge scheduled for Christmas 2021.

On 12 September 1940, a lone Dornier flew along the Stroud Valley and photographed the area. Detailed mapping of the Sperry factory was noted by German Intelligence, in preparation for a raid in February 1943, although this never occurred.

=== Post War ===
Rationalisation of the railways happened quickly after the Second World War, with passenger services being suspended on the Stroud and Nailsworth branch in 1947, and to freight in 1966, though special excursion trains for mill workers were provided for day outings (up to 1965). The Midland Railway station was closed in 1965. Burdett Road station, the last of two stations that Stonehouse possessed, was threatened with closure in 1972, but remains open. (The Midland line had a separate platform from the Bristol main line that users referred to as a third station.)

Stonehouse was connected to the national motorway network in 1971, when the M5 opened. In the late 20th century, Stonehouse saw substantial growth within industry; large multinationals such as ABB, International Intelligence and Intelligent Armour moving into the area.

Housing development in Stonehouse continued during the post-war period, with the Park Estate being built in the 1950s, Little Australia, Boakes Drive and continuing into the 21st century, with the small developments at Arrowsmith Drive and Court View, which is located opposite Stonehouse Court and built partially on the old Stroud and Nailsworth branch line in 2002. A small development adjacent to Arrowsmith Drive is being constructed in 2017, technically this is in the parish of Standish. In 2018, a small hamlet of 8 houses was built on the site of Stonehouse Youth Centre in Elm Road.

In 1986 an outbreak of meningitis in Stonehouse led to the founding of The Meningitis Trust. Now known as Meningitis Now and based in nearby Stroud, the charity has funded over £12 million of preventative research.
