= Rodborough =

Village in Gloucestershire, England

Coordinates: 51.744°N 2.215°W

- Location within Gloucestershire
- Population: 5,174 (2021 Census)
- OS grid reference: SO851051
- Civil parish: Rodborough
- District: Stroud
- Shire county: Gloucestershire
- Region: South West
- Country: England
- Sovereign state: United Kingdom
- Post town: STROUD
- Postcode district: GL5
- Dialling code: 01453
- Police: Gloucestershire
- Fire: Gloucestershire
- Ambulance: South Western
- UK Parliament: Stroud

Rodborough is a large village and civil parish in the district of Stroud, Gloucestershire, in South West England. It is directly south of the town of Stroud, north of the town of Nailsworth and north-west of the town of Minchinhampton. The parish includes the settlements of Bagpath (not to be confused with Bagpath in the Ozleworth valley), Butterrow, Kingscourt, Lightpill and Rooksmoor, and is adjacent to the Stroud suburb of Dudbridge. The population taken at the 2011 census was 5,334.

== Geography ==
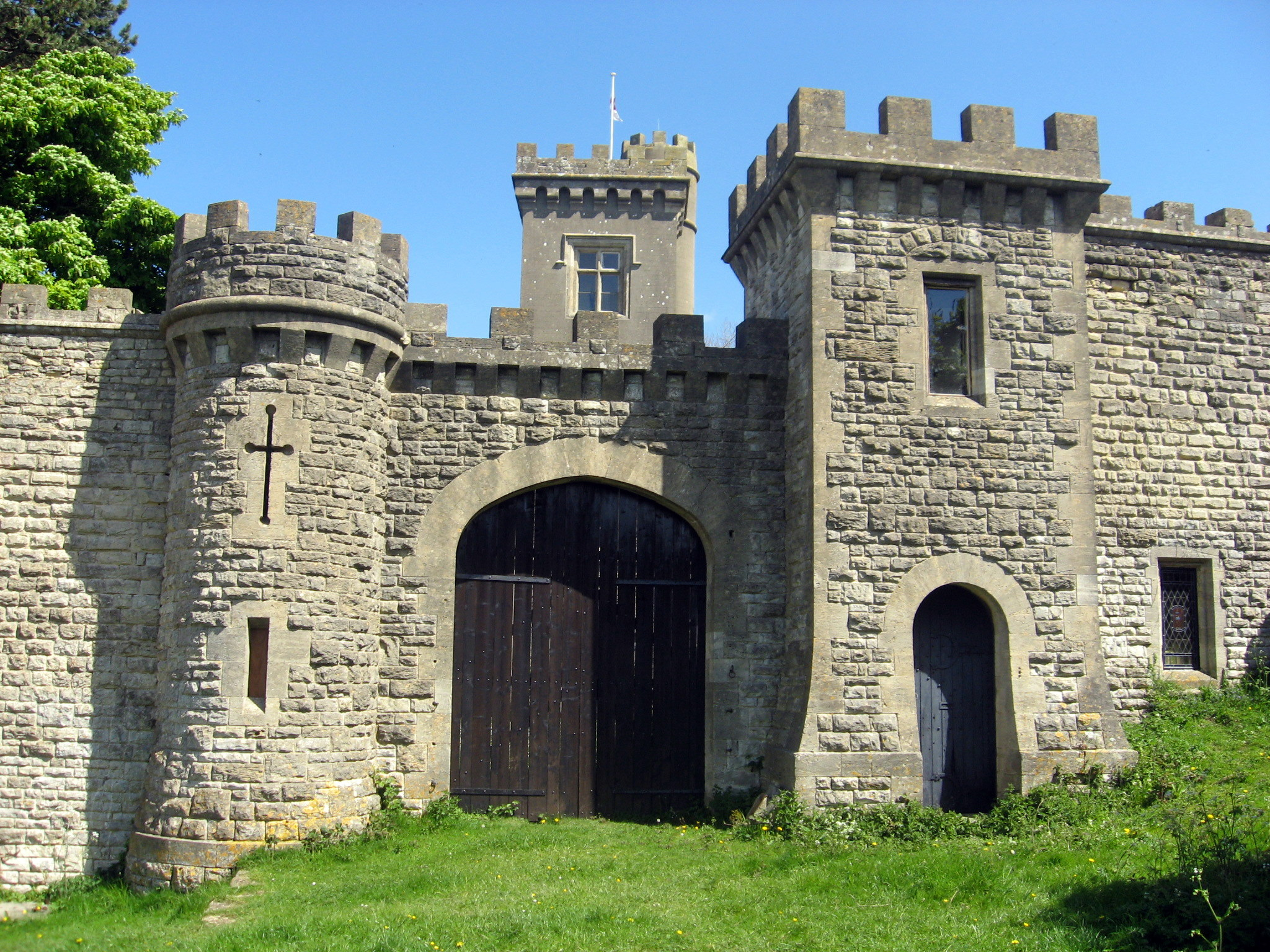
An entrance to Rodborough Fort

Built on a hill, Rodborough village is near Rodborough Common, a public recreation area popular with walkers. Most of the common land was donated to the National Trust in 1937 by Thomas Bainbrigge Fletcher (1878–1950), a naval officer and entomologist. On the common is Rodborough Fort, a folly built in 1761 that is now a private house.

== Amenities ==
Rodborough Common is a Site of Special Scientific Interest.

The parish has two primary schools, several public houses, a large hotel called The Bear of Rodborough Hotel and a community hall. It is home to the historic Winstones Ice Cream Factory. It has a large and active Christian community who attend the Church of England parish church of St. Mary Magdalene or Rodborough Tabernacle United Reformed Church, and its various clubs and societies include a football club, a Scout group and a mother and toddler network.

The local newspaper is the Stroud News & Journal and the parish council also produces a quarterly newsletter called The Commoner.

== Governance ==
Rodborough is served by Rodborough Parish Council, Stroud District Council and Gloucestershire County Council. Until 1974 much of the parish was part of the Stroud Urban District Council and today it forms part of the Stroud urban area, along with Stroud and Cainscross.

An electoral ward in the same name exists. All of this ward is within the civil parish and a reduced population therefore applies: at the 2011 Census it was 4,543.

== Notable people ==
Sir John Dean Paul, 1st Baronet (1775–1852), of Rodborough, was a landowner, banker, and painter.

The Gothic Revival architect Benjamin Bucknall was born in Rodborough in 1833. He designed the uncompleted Woodchester Mansion and a number of houses and Roman Catholic churches and convents, particularly in Gloucestershire and South Wales. In later life he worked in Algiers. The Reverend Wilbert Awdry, who wrote The Railway Series of children's books that inspired the TV series Thomas & Friends, moved to 30 Rodborough Avenue in 1965 and lived there until his death on 21 March 1997.
