= Emma Bridgewater (businesswoman) =

British designer and manufacturer (born 1961/62)

- Born: 1961 or 1962 (age 64–65); Cambridgeshire, England, UK
- Occupations: Designer and manufacturer
- Known for: Emma Bridgewater

Dame Emma Bridgewater DBE (born 1961/1962) is a British designer and the founder of Emma Bridgewater, a pottery and home goods manufacturer and retailer. She has been credited with reviving English spongeware production and the country's earthenware industry and with helping to revive the city of Stoke-on-Trent.

== Early life and education ==
Bridgewater was born in Cambridgeshire, the eldest of three siblings. Her parents, Charlotte and Adrian Bridgewater, separated when she was seven, and she moved to North Oxford with her mother and siblings. Her mother remarried, and Bridgewater has two half-siblings. Her siblings include Nell Gifford, co-founder and ringmistress of Giffords Circus. She attended Oxford High School. She graduated from the University of London with a degree in English Literature.

== Career ==
Bridgewater began designing pottery in 1985 from her flat in South London. She had been searching for an idea for a business, and when she was unable to find a cup and saucer she liked for a gift for her mother, she decided to start a pottery business. She created a spongeware design for a mug, jug, dish, and bowl in earthenware, found a model maker in Stoke-on-Trent to make molds, and had 100 of each design manufactured. She set up a kiln and taught herself to glaze and fire pottery. She sold her designs at a stall in Covent Garden market and trade shows, and created a leaflet with her designs that she distributed to shops. In her first year in business, she sold about £30,000. In 1991 she bought a small factory and opened her first retail store.

In 1996 she bought Eastwood Works in Hanley in Stoke-on-Trent, which as of 2023 produces all of the company's pottery. As of 2023 the business employs 500 and produces 40,000 pieces of pottery weekly.

House & Garden and Homes and Antiques credit Bridgewater with reviving the traditional craft of spongeware in England and in turn helping to revive Stoke-on-Trent. The Daily Telegraph said she "single-handedly revived the country’s earthenware industry". Staffordshire University awarded her an Honorary Doctorate for her work revitalizing the region and the Stoke-on-Trent pottery industry.

== Book ==
Bridgewater's memoir was first published in 2014 as Toast & Marmalade and Other Stories by Saltyard Books, Hodder & Stoughton, and republished in 2015 as Toast & Marmalade: Stories from the kitchen dresser, a memoir.

== Personal life ==
Bridgewater married Matthew Rice in 1987. The couple separated in 2018 and divorced. She and Rice have four children.

As of 2009 Bridgewater lived in Norfolk. She and Rice bought a property in Oxfordshire; after the separation, she moved back to Norfolk.

She was appointed CBE in 2013. In 2025 she was made a Dame.
