= Tweedy the Clown =

Scottish clown

Alan Digweed BEM
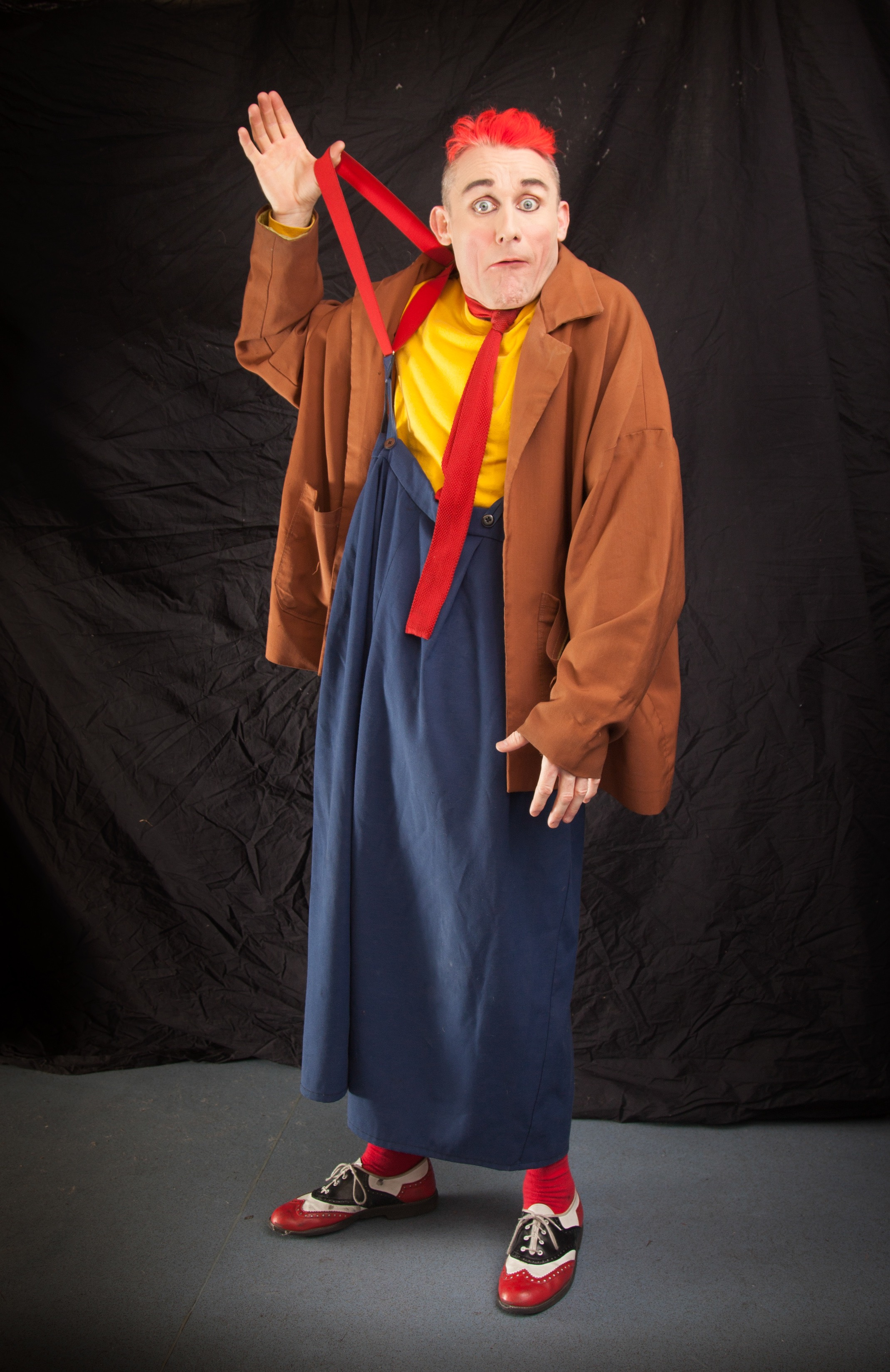
- Digweed as Tweedy the Clown, posing.
- Born: 28 December 1974 (age 51); Aberdeen, Aberdeenshire, Scotland
- Other name: Tweedy the Clown

Comedy career
- Medium: Circus, Pantomime
- Genre: Circus clown
- Website: https://tweedyclown.com/

Alan "Tweedy" Digweed BEM (born 28 December 1974), better known as Tweedy the Clown, is a Scottish performer and clown, known for his physical and slapstick style of comedy. He has performed in several shows around the world, and is most known for his work in Giffords Circus. He was awarded a British Empire Medal in the 2023 New Year Honours for his dedication to the arts.

== Early life ==
Digweed was born and raised in Aberdeen. Digweed's first job was as a cleaner in the secondary school that he had attended (and only just left).

== Career ==
=== Origins ===
Digweed's first professional performing role was in a 1992 pantomime, Jack and the Beanstalk, performed at the Haddo House Hall in Aberdeenshire. Following on from this, Digweed realised he wanted to be a clown, but that he "didn't know how". To learn the trade of being a clown, Digweed wanted to go to Fool Time, based in Bristol, however it went bust and closed down the year that he wanted to go. After discovering this, Digweed wrote a questionnaire to a series of circus clowns as "personal research" One of the questionnaires he received back was from Martin "Zippo" Burton, who said that the best way to learn was from other clowns, and invited Digweed to join him to do "publicity clowning" and learn on the job. This involved handing out leaflets on the street, as well as doing school and hospital shows.

In the first week of working at Zippos Circus, Burton got stuck in traffic on the way to a performance; leaving Digweed to step in and perform in the ring after he volunteered to do so. Martin watched the end of Digweed's performance, and offered Digweed a job in the ring at Zippos Circus as Burton's understudy. Digweed accepted, and would go on to work there for eight years. He was 19 at the time, and claims that this was the start of his career.

=== Circus Career ===
==== Zippos Circus: 1994-2002 ====
Digweed worked at Zippos Circus between 1994 and 2002, doing what he described as "very traditional clowning." It was here that the name "Tweedy" originated. In his early days at Zippos Circus, Digweed used the name "Weedy the Clown", a reference to his surname. However, he was informed there was already a Weedy, so he added a T to make Tweedy the Clown. He claims "this just felt right" while it also has a Scottish connection.

==== Gifford's Circus: 2004-2025 ====
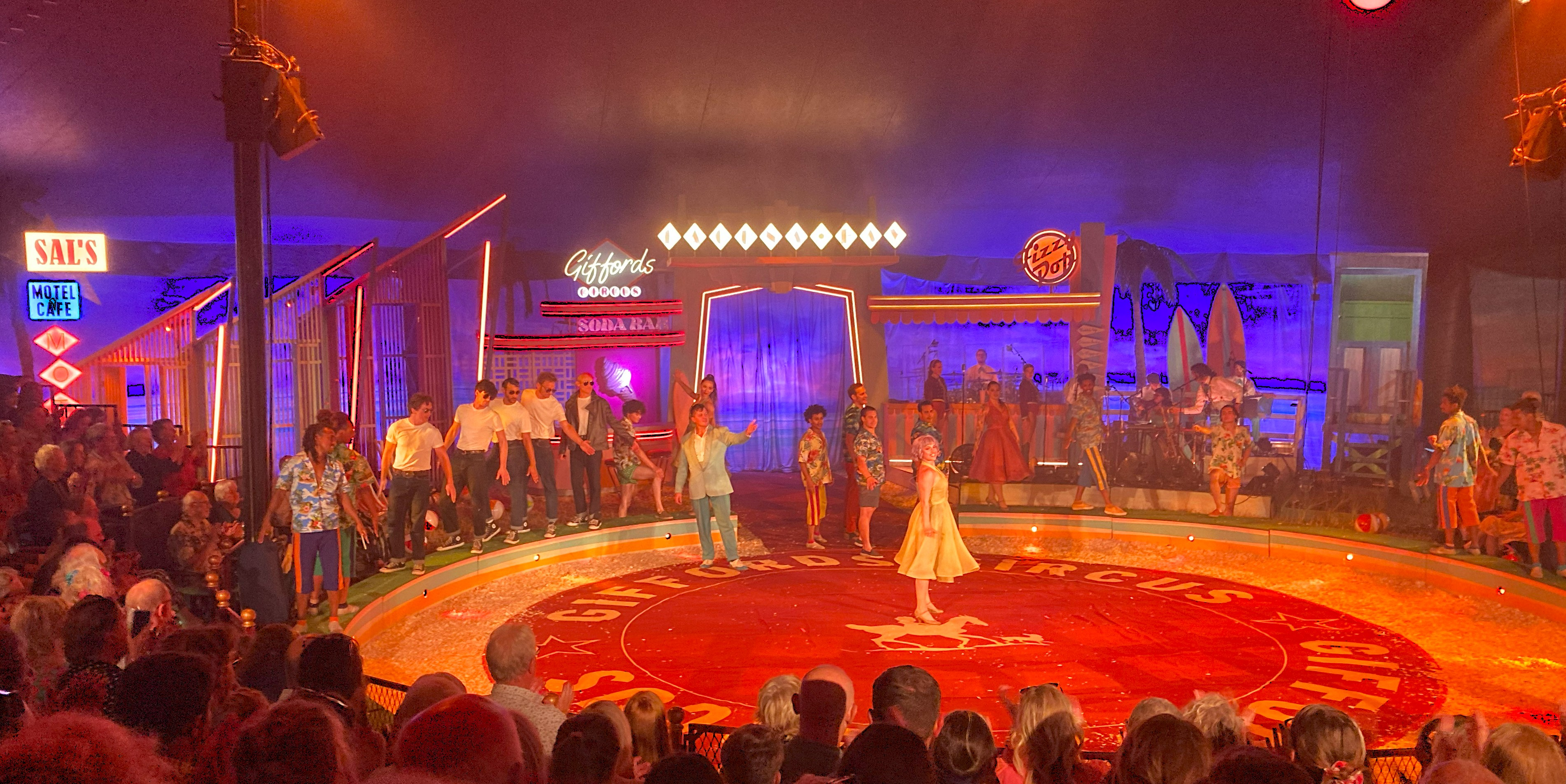
The ring of Giffords Circus in 2025. Digweed is not present in this photo.

In 1996, Digweed met Nell Gifford, where the two became friends. Nell, alongside her future husband Toti Gifford, went on to start Giffords Circus in 2000. Digweed first saw Giffords Circus in 2002, where he said that he "really liked it." Digweed had already signed elsewhere for work in 2003, but towards the end of the year he approached Nell to join Giffords Circus. Nell was interested in recruiting Digweed, however wanted him to lose his traditional clown appearance that he usually wore at the time. This suited Digweed, as he wished to lose the look anyway. Therefore, Digweed joined Giffords Circus in 2004, and has since toured with them 17 times, becoming a well-known face in the circus.

In 2024, Digweed took a one year break from Giffords Circus to perform in "Tweedy's Massive Circus" — a touring show done in collaboration with Underbelly, which took him to the 2024 Edinburgh Fringe, among other UK festivals.

=== Pantomime ===
Digweed, performing as Tweedy, is a regular face at the annual Pantomime at the Everyman Theatre, Cheltenham.

=== Television series: Tweedy's Lost & Found ===
During the COVID-19 pandemic of 2020, Digweed started a small television series titled "Tweedy's Lost & Found". Here, Tweedy would perform in his traditional clowning style, on stage alone. The episodes were live streamed from the Barn Theatre, Cirencester, and are now available on Youtube. There was one series and twelve episodes, each ranging from between 25-35 minutes long. Several of the episodes had celebrity cameos, where the celebrity would appear on an online call and talk to Tweedy. Some celebrities included were Helena Bonham Carter, Nick Knowles, and Holli Dempsey.

=== Current solo shows ===
In 2025, Digweed premiered his solo slow, "Tweedy's Massive Solo Show", receiving positive reviews from critics. In 2026, Digweed is touring around the southwest of England with his solo circus, "Tweedy's Massive Circus".

== Performance Style ==
=== Appearance ===
Digweed most commonly performs as Tweedy the Clown. Although labelled as a "clown", he does not follow the conventional clown appearance. He does not wear clown shoes, a red nose, or a large amount of make-up. Instead, he is renowned for his bright red hair and subtle eyeliner. The origin of his red hair comes from a performance in 1996 when doing a Christmas Show at a leisure centre in Gloucester. The following year, while performing a routine with a birthday cake, he accidentally set fire to his hair. The front tuff was all that remained, with the sides and back shaven. From here on, he kept the look.

=== Performances and skills ===
During performances, particularly when playing Tweedy, Digweed's character often comically fails at whatever task he is attempting, with things going wrong, tools/objects falling apart, or with Tweedy messing the task up.

While performing, Digweed uses regular, repeated comical traits of his character Tweedy throughout various shows. One example of this would be Tweedy's pet clothes iron, named Keef, who regularly appears alongside Tweedy on stage. Tweedy would drag Keef around with him on his "lead" and make him do tricks, impressing the audience. Digweed has a tattoo of Keef on his left hand. Another regular feature is Tweedy's phrase "Oh no! It's all dirty!" when dropping his hat on the floor. Often, he will wipe it on an audience member to clean it. Another phrase Tweedy's character uses is "calm down ladies", often at random, nonsensical moments.

Digweed also has many skills which he utilises on stage. These include playing instruments and juggling.

== Personal life ==
Digweed was born and brought up in Aberdeen. Digweed currently lives in Stroud, Gloucestershire, saying he likes it as "it's normal to be weird there."

Digweed is married to Sharon Digweed, who he met through the circus. Together, they have one daughter.
