= The Old Lodge (Minchinhampton) =

Historic building in Stroud, Gloucestershire

- Old Lodge Inn
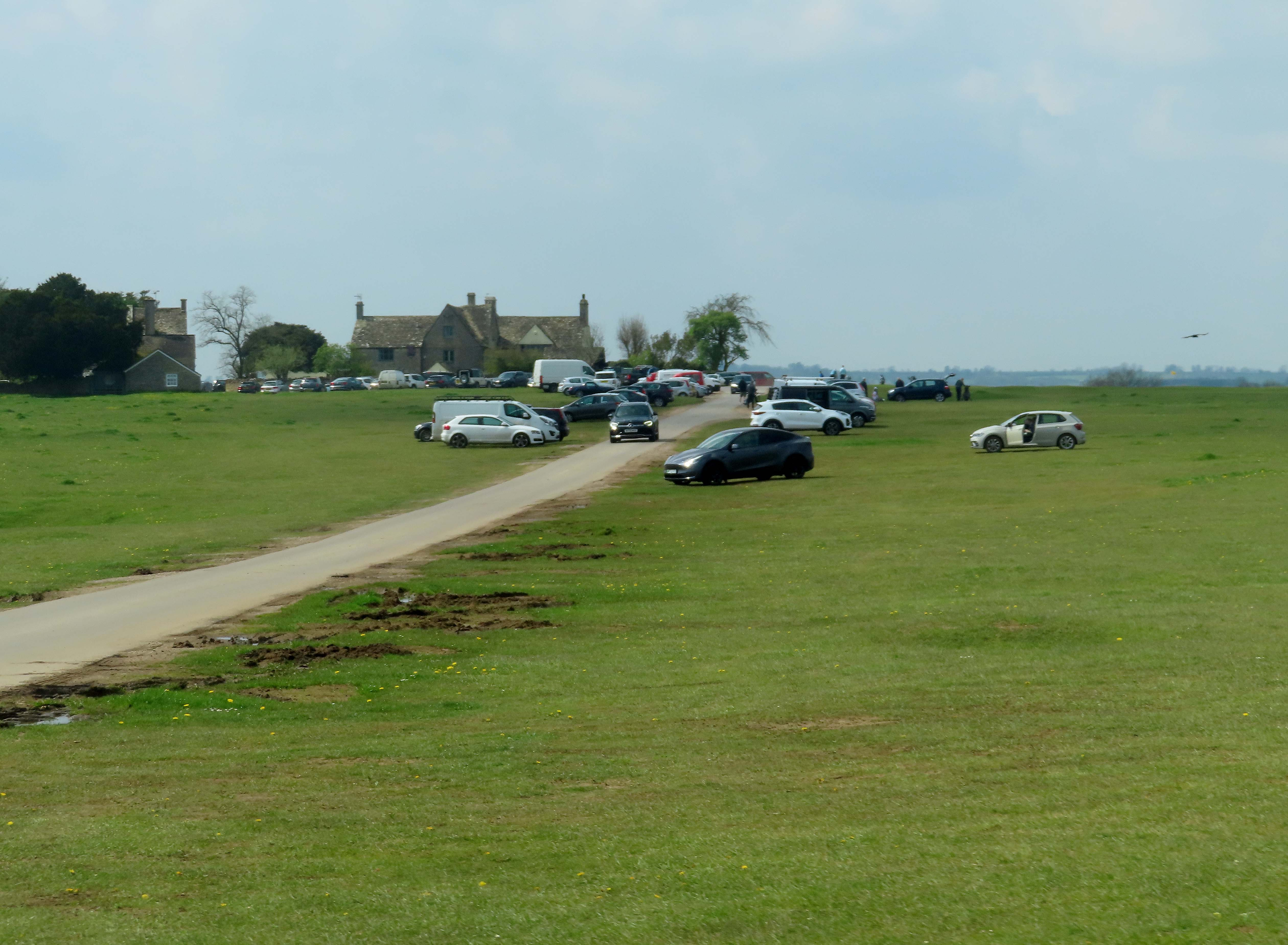
- The Old Lodge in 2023, looking west

- Location within Gloucestershire Location within England
- 51.7059°N 2.2131°W
- Location: Minchinhampton, Gloucestershire, England

History
- Built: c. 1680 (346 years ago)

Site notes
- Area: The Cotswolds

Listed Building – Grade II
- Designated: 11 May 1978
- Reference no.: 1091074

The Old Lodge (also known as Old Lodge Inn) is a Grade II listed building in Minchinhampton, Gloucestershire, England. It stands in the centre of Minchinhampton Common.

The building dates to the mid-to-late 17th century, originally built as a hunting lodge, and was enlarged around a century later when it became an inn. It is constructed of limestone rubble, with ashlar chimneys and a stone slate roof. It is two storeys with an attic; it was extended to the south. The original 17th-century frontage is on the northern side, obscured by a late-19th-century wing addition with an east-facing gable.

It became the clubhouse for the adjacent golf course in 1895. Minchinhampton Commons Golf Club had been formed six years earlier.

Some sources claim the building was originally the home of the Common's warrener, who oversaw artificial medieval rabbit warrens. Another states that Charles I played lawn bowls at the lodge when he was passing through in 1643, on his way to the siege of Gloucester. The bowling enclosure has been dated to 1788, however.

Until the foot-and-mouth epidemic of 2001, the Lodge was the venue for Marking Day, on which animals had their ears tagged before being allowed to graze on the common. Post-epidemic requirements are that animals are now marked at their home farm.
