= Arthur Parkinson =

British gardener (born 1992)

Arthur William Parkinson (born 1992) is a gardener, award-winning broadcaster, best-selling author, influencer, artist and florist.

== Early life and career ==
Parkinson was born in 1992. His parents split up when he was 11 and he developed an interest in plants with him crediting gardening to his grandmother Min’s vegetable garden.

Parkinson trained at the Royal Botanical Gardens, Kew before working for Sarah Raven at Perch Hill, East Sussex. He was the head gardener at the Emma Bridgewater factory garden.

Parkinson has published articles on gardening, hens and floristry. He is regarded as one of a growing group of young gardening influencers and has received national media coverage. Parkinson has published four books, which have appeared on the Sunday Times Bestseller List. His book The 'Flower Yard: Growing Flamboyant Flowers in Containers' was named as one of The Times top ten best gardening books of 2021.

Parkinson won the Garden Media Guild award for Best Radio Broadcast or Podcast for his "Grow, Cook, Eat, Arrange" podcast with Sarah Raven in 2021. He appeared in a 2019 episode of Gardener’s World. His chicken artwork has appeared in a range of products sold by Fortnum and Mason.

== Personal life ==
He lives in a cottage in the Cotswolds with his partner James Mackie, the interior designer.

As a child, he wrote to Deborah Cavendish, Duchess of Devonshire, with whom he bonded over a shared interest in hens.

== Books ==
- The Flower Yard: Growing Flamboyant Flowers in Containers
- The Flower Yard in Containers & Pots: Creating Paradise Season By Season
- The Pottery Gardener: Flowers and Hens at the Emma Bridgewater Factory
- The Flower Yard: Planting a paradise
- "Chicken boy: my life with hens"
- The Hen Party: a celebration
