= Jolly John Nash =

'Jolly' John Nash
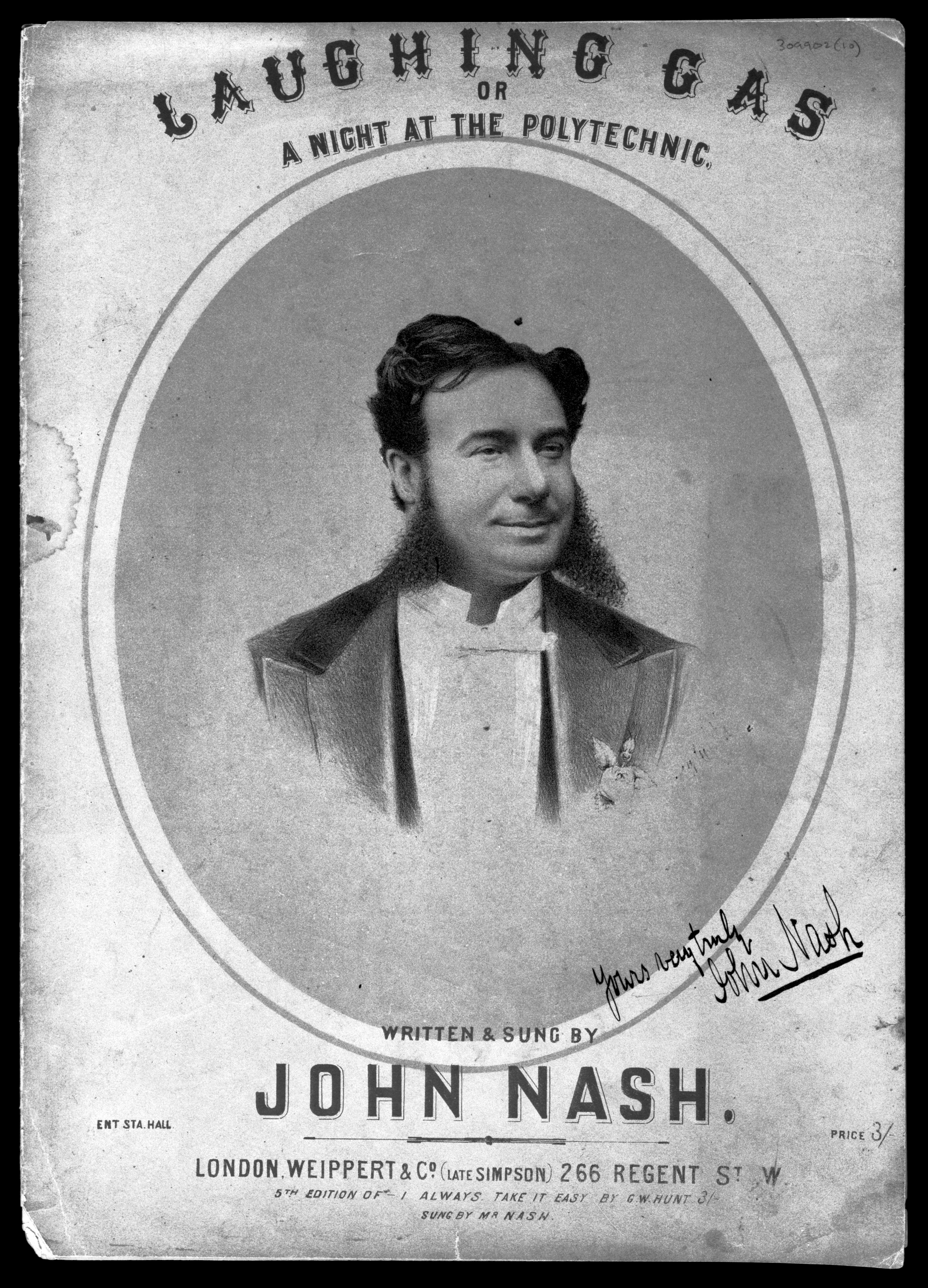
- Sheet music, c.1860s

Background information
- Born: John Nash; 7 March 1828; Minchinhampton, Gloucestershire, England
- Died: 13 October 1901 (aged 73) Fulham, London, England
- Genre: Music hall
- Occupations: Singer, comic entertainer
- Years active: 1864–1900

John Nash (7 March 1828 – 13 October 1901), often billed as 'Jolly' John Nash, was an English music hall singer and comedian who was noted for his "laughing songs".

== Biography ==
He was born in Minchinhampton, Gloucestershire, the son of Martha and James Nash, who was a cloth worker. He studied music in his youth, and learned cornet. In 1854 he married Lydney-born Margaret Brown in Gloucester, and a few years later he was co-owner of the small Oaken and Churchway Level Colliery near Parkend in the Forest of Dean. In early adulthood he was active in campaigns to start a Volunteer Force, and was a choir master and band master. He lived with his wife and children at York Lodge near Parkend, where he was described in the 1861 census as a coal master, fire brick maker, and coal and coke merchant.

His business failed and in 1864 he was described as bankrupt. By that time, he was already familiar with London music halls, and had met impresario Charles Morton, the "Father of the Halls" and proprietor of the Canterbury and Oxford Music Halls. Morton presented him on stage and, though Nash was initially afflicted by stage fright, he rapidly became successful.

His ebullient personality soon gained him the nickname "Jolly", and he was also billed as "The Laughing Blacksmith". He specialised in comic songs such as "The Nice Old Maids", "Sister Mary Walked Like That", "I Couldn't Help Laughing", "The Convivial Man", and his version of "Little Brown Jug". Music historian Peter Gammond said of Nash: "A large man who shook with mirth as he sang, he pioneered the laughing song which was copied by many later exponents; he was also an early practitioner of the funny walk".

He moved to London with his family, and became Chairman of the Strand Music Hall between 1866 and 1868. He toured widely and regularly with Arthur Lloyd, and in February 1868 the two performers became the first to be invited to sing before the Prince of Wales, later Edward VII. The performance, at an event hosted by Lord Carrington, pleased the audience. The Prince of Wales continued to be an admirer of Nash until on one occasion Nash slapped the prince on the back, and was ostracised thereafter for his impertinence. He was also known to Charles Dickens, who mentioned him as "Jolly John" in Household Words in 1865.

In 1874, Nash undertook his first tour of the United States, and was one of the first British music hall performers to do so. According to the New York Herald, within a few minutes of his first appearance he "convinced his audience that it was no vulgar music-hall performance, but a genuine, genial and artistic humourist..... His humour is so infectious that no sooner does he enter into one of his inimitable laughing songs, than the whole audience at once gives way, and a chorus of laughter is raised..". He toured the U.S. again in 1876, and returned in 1886 for an eighteen-month tour with his own company. He later said that "he had sung in every State, shaken hands with three Presidents, and lunched with two." In 1889, he toured in Australia, where he was described as "a world-renowned vocalist... a capital raconteur and an admirable executant on many musical instruments...". He regularly performed on concertina, as well as cornet.

In 1891 he published a book of stories and anecdotes, The Merriest Man Alive. He returned to perform in the Forest of Dean in 1893. He appeared in numerous shows to benefit his fellow performers, and became president of the Music Hall Sick Fund Provident Society. Fundraising events were also held for his own benefit, featuring such performers as George Robey, Herbert Campbell, Harry Randall, Dan Leno, Florrie Forde, and G. H. Chirgwin. Though in declining health, he made a final tour of the U. S. in 1900, though his style of performance was increasingly seen as outdated.

He died at his home in Fulham, London in 1901, aged 73, and was buried in Fulham Cemetery.
