= Sarah Raven =

British gardener

Sarah Clare Raven (born 3 February 1963) is an English gardener, cook and writer.

== Early life and education ==
Raven was born in Marylebone, the daughter of John Earle Raven (d. 1980), a classics don and Senior Tutor at King's College, Cambridge, and his wife Faith née Hugh Smith (Constance Faith Alethea Hugh Smith), a daughter of Owen Hugh Smith (1869–1958).

Raven graduated from the University of Edinburgh with a degree in history and then trained as a doctor at the University of London.

== Biography ==
=== Company ===
She runs a mail-order company, specialising in cutting plants. The gardener Christopher Lloyd, a near-neighbour at Great Dixter, described Raven in the mid-1990s as "really energetic and creative ... promot[ing] a more dynamic and showy style of gardening than has been fashionable for many years."

=== Publications ===
Raven's publications include The Cutting Garden, The Bold and Brilliant Garden, The Great Vegetable Plot, Sarah Raven's Garden Cookbook (U.S. title: In Season) which was named Cookery Book of the Year by the Guild of Food Writers in 2008. and A Year Full of Flowers which describes her garden at Perch Hill in Sussex. In 2011, she published a monumental book on Wild Flowers, with photographs by Jonathan Buckley, who has worked with her on most of her books. Sissinghurst: Vita Sackville-West and the Creation of a Garden was published in November 2014.

=== Broadcasting ===
A BBC2 television series called Bees, Butterflies and Blooms, which she presented, focusing on the national decline in pollinating insects and championing nectar-rich flowers as a way of saving them, was broadcast in February 2012. She presented an episode of Great British Garden Revival which aired on BBC Two in 2014.

== Personal life ==
She is married to writer Adam Nicolson, and has two daughters with him, plus three stepsons from his previous marriage. Her family's move to a small farm in Sussex was depicted in Nicolson's book Perch Hill: A New Life.

== Awards ==
- 2021: winner, Garden Media Guild award for Best Radio Broadcast or Podcast for her "Grow, Cook, Eat, Arrange" podcast with Arthur Parkinson

== Publications ==
- The Cutting Garden
- The Bold and Brilliant Garden
- The Great Vegetable Plot
- Sarah Raven's Garden Cookbook (U.S. title: In Season)
- A Year Full of Flowers
- Wild Flowers (2011) – with photographs by Jonathan Buckley
- Sissinghurst: Vita Sackville-West and the Creation of a Garden (2014)
