= Longstone of Minchinhampton =

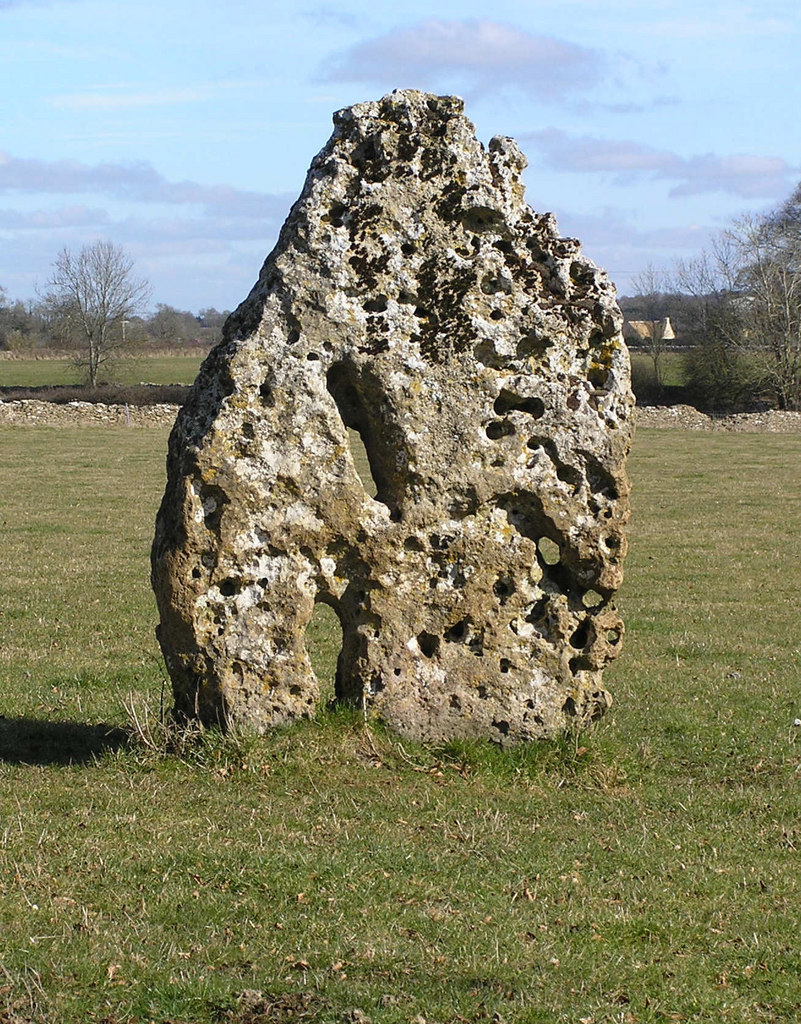

- Location within Gloucestershire
- 51.69727°N 2.16851°W
- Location: Minchinhampton, Gloucestershire, England

Site notes
- Architectural style: British pre-Roman Architecture

The Longstone of Minchinhampton (grid reference ST884998) is a standing stone on Minchinhampton Common, Minchinhampton in Gloucestershire, England. The stone is clearly visible in a field accessible via the southeast road out of the village. The stone is 7.5 feet (2.3 m) high, made of limestone and has natural holes in it. Tradition suggests that passing infants through one of the holes will cure them of illnesses such as measles or whooping cough.

== Geology ==
The Longstone is a large piece of oolitic limestone standing upright in a field, known as Longstone Field, 1 mile (1.6 km) east of the Minchinhampton village. It is 7.5 feet (2.3 m) high and 6 feet (1.8 m) wide, with natural holes through its 15 inches (380 mm) width. Nearby, 12 yards (11 m) to the south west, there is a fallen standing stone which has been built into a dry stone wall, and may have once formed a stone pair with the Longstone. The area has numerous barrows and near the Longstone ornaments, flint and arrowheads have all been found.

== Lore ==
Attempts to pull the Longstone out with oxen failed as "something" stopped it from being moved, so the stone remained in the field. The stone was believed to be able to cure infants of maladies such as measles and whooping cough, by passing the child through one of the natural holes. A myth amongst children at the beginning of the 20th century was that the Longstone would run around the field at the stroke of midnight.

The menhir is supposedly the burial site of one of the Danish leaders, after a battle at Woeful Danes' Bottom, nearby. Other tales suggest that the stone was in place for the battle, with soldiers shooting through the holes and that the nearby tumuli are the graves of the soldiers.
