= Neu-Lindsey Nature Reserve =

Nature reserve in Gloucestershire, England

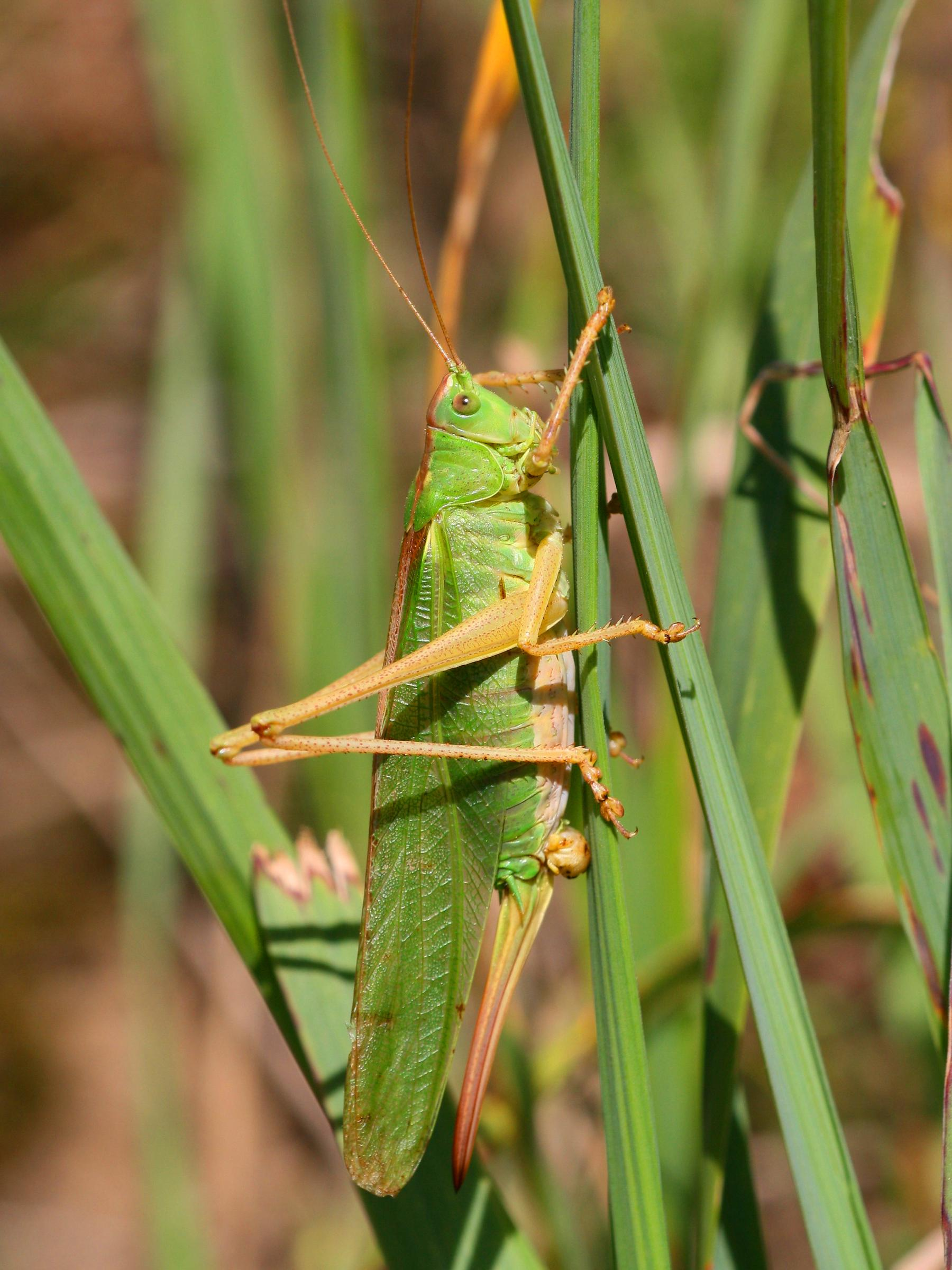
- Example - great green bush cricket (Tettigonia viridissima)

- Location within Gloucestershire
- Type: Gloucestershire Wildlife Trust nature reserve
- Location: south of St Chloe, adjoins Minchinhampton Common
- Coordinates: 51°42′41.64″N 2°13′30.04″W
- Area: 1 acre (0.40 ha)
- Created: 1986
- Operator: Gloucestershire Wildlife Trust
- Status: Open all year

Neu-Lindsey Nature Reserve (grid reference SO845014) is a 0.4-hectare (0.99-acre) nature reserve in Gloucestershire. The site is listed in the ‘Stroud District’ Local Plan, adopted November 2005, Appendix 6 (online for download) as a Key Wildlife Site (KWS).

The site is owned and managed by the Gloucestershire Wildlife Trust since 1986. It was donated by Mrs T Lindsey.

== Location and habitat ==
The reserve adjoins the western edge of Minchinhampton Common which is a Site of Special Scientific Interest. It lies south of St Chloe and is on a south-west facing slope which overlooks Woodchester. It is not part of the SSSI. It is on Inferior Oolitic limestone and Cotteswold Sand.

The boundaries of the reserve are a dry-stone wall on the east and fencing on the other sides. The reserve is considered to be an excellent example of unimproved grassland flora and fauna. The site has been managed as a traditional hay meadow for a long period of time.

== Flora ==
The range of plants is wide and includes bee orchid, horseshoe vetch and chalk milkwort. The site supports an abundant population of pyramidal orchids. Typical plants which flourish on the site are cowslip, salad burnet, common rock-rose, yellow-rattle, burnet-saxifrage, oxeye daisy, spring-sedge (Carex caryophyllea) and marjoram. Grasses include upright brome, quaking-grass, sweet vernal-grass, crested hair-grass, yellow oat-grass and sheep's fescue. Tor-grass is dominant but in small areas. Devil's-bit scabious is present on the lower slopes. Sainfoin has entered the site from surrounding fields.

There is a scrub line along the wall boundary which includes hawthorn, dog-rose, bramble, field maple, hazel, holly and traveller's joy. There are some mature ash, sycamore and horse-chestnut trees. The ground flora beneath the trees and scrub includes ivy, dog's mercury, bluebell, lesser celandine, hairy St John's-wort and cow parsley.

== Fauna ==
The reserve is known for the presence of the uncommon great green bush cricket, one of the largest insects in northern Europe. Glow worms are also present.

Butterflies recorded include common blue, small copper, ringlet and small heath. Large populations of butterflies are seen as a result of the wide range of flowers and grasses. The moth population is well documented (some 80 species or more) and includes drinker, poplar hawk moth and burnished brass.

Mammals recorded on the site are wood mouse, common shrew and field vole.

== Conservation ==
Traditional hay cutting regimes are carried out to ensure that the flowering sward is maintained. Scrub is kept under control to prevent invasion of the grassland.

== Publications ==
- Kelham, A, Sanderson, J, Doe, J, Edgeley-Smith, M, et al., 1979, 1990, 2002 editions, 'Nature Reserves of the Gloucestershire Trust for Nature Conservation/Gloucestershire Wildlife Trust'
- ‘Nature Reserve Guide – discover the wild Gloucestershire on your doorstep’ - 50th Anniversary, January 2011, Gloucestershire Wildlife Trust
