= Rodborough Common, Gloucestershire =

Biological and geological Site of Special Scientific Interest in the United Kingdom

Rodborough Common
- Site of Special Scientific Interest
- Location within Gloucestershire
- Location of Rodborough Common.
- Area of search: Gloucestershire
- Grid reference: SO851035
- Coordinates: 51.730465°N 2.216418°W
- Interest: Biological/Geological
- Area: 116.0 ha (287 acres)
- Notification date: 1954

Rodborough Common is a 116.0-hectare (287-acre) biological and geological Site of Special Scientific Interest in Rodborough, Gloucestershire, England, notified in 1954. The site is listed in the ‘Stroud District’ Local Plan, adopted November 2005, Appendix 6 (online for download) as an SSSI and a Regionally Important Geological Site (RIGS). The Common is also a Special Area of Conservation (SAC) under the EU Habitats Directive.

Rodborough Common is sited south of Stroud and has been owned and managed by the National Trust since 1937. It is north of Minchinhampton Common. It lies on Jurassic limestone and is on top of the Cotswold scarp. It is bounded on either side by the Nailsworth valley and the Frome valley. It is on a hill (a plateau area), and its margins are dissected by dry valleys. The sides of this plateau are steep.

Rodborough Common, like Minchinhampton Common, is notified for its biological and geological importance. The grassland is unimproved, herb-rich and calcareous. There is an important geological area for fossils for research purposes.

== Geology ==
There are old quarry workings which are near Rodborough Fort. These contain exposures of Inferior Oolite limestones of the Middle Jurassic Period. The fossils are numerous in the strata, and provide many species. Of particular interest are bivalve molluscs, and these were first defined from specimens collected on this site. The site is particularly significant as it is the only remaining one in the region. It is close to the southern edge of the Middle Inferior Oolite. This is cut out beneath the overlying Upper Trigonia Grit (across the common and to the south). In research terms this shows the effects of earth movements on the local succession.

== Biology ==
=== Flora ===
The grassland plateau supports tor-grass, upright brome, sheep's fescue and quaking grass. This area is relatively short as it is grazed and there is recreational use. The slopes support a higher sward and this is the area for insect life. Herbs recorded include chalk milkwort, clustered bellflower, kidney vetch and autumn gentian. There are several species of orchid which include frog orchid, bee orchid and musk orchid. The rare pasqueflower is recorded at this site.

Scrub is scattered over the Common and near the edges. This include hawthorn, bramble and there are various types of small trees. Juniper is present. Where there is broad-leaved woodland, this is mainly beech and ash.

=== Fauna ===
Invertebrates flourish on this site and butterflies recorded include the Duke of Burgundy and marsh fritillary. There are bugs, beetles and moths recorded. The snail Abida secale is present. In 2019 a project to reintroduce the endangered Large blue to the common was undertaken with an estimated 750 butterflies emerging in the summer of 2020.

== SSSI Source ==
- Natural England SSSI information on the citation
- Natural England SSSI information on the Rodborough Common units
