= Mary Deverell =

Mary Deverell (born 4 February 1731 near Minchinhampton, Gloucestershire, England, died early September 1805, Nailsworth, Gloucestershire), was a moral and religious essayist, born into the family of a clothier. Samuel Johnson and other London figures subscribed to her works. She raised objections to the social idea that "the female sphere is domestic."

== Career ==
=== Sermons ===
Mary Deverell was self-educated and probably not married. Having been prompted by a clergyman to write him a sermon he could preach, she produced a volume of them in 1774. Though she made repeated claims to humility, these reflect a combative feminism. One sermon on the story of Jesus and the woman taken in adultery (John 8:1–11; the woman faces trial while her lover does not) notes the "vile partiality" of the Pharisees "in favour of their own sex".

Deverell arrived in London about 1774. Her subscribers included aristocracy, Bristol clergy, and the Rector of Minchinhampton, who ordered twenty copies. She noted approval from clergy, but added that "the title of Sermons from a woman startles them! and [in their view sermonizing] must not be encouraged in our sex." She obtained permission from Charlotte, Princess Royal to dedicate a third edition to her.

=== "Summer reading" ===
Deverell's Miscellanies in Prose and Verse (1781) were presented as "a light kind of summer reading" for young people. It is learned, but ranges widely. Among the subscribers was Samuel Johnson. She comments on the unlikelihood of a poor person becoming a writer, describes her search for patrons, and imagines switching the roles of the sexes in a poem entitled "Epistle to a Divine, on the united merits of the Pen and the Needle". She rebels against the notion that "the female sphere is domestic, and the practice of our duty in that province should be our highest ambition," and sees a woman trapped in an unhappy marriage as "the legal slave of a despotic sovereign".

However, Deverell's work failed to impress Hannah More, another female religious writer of the period, who spoke of "a fit of poetical phrenzy... bursting with the inspiring God" in relation to Deverell's long poem in praise of female heroism, Theodora and Dydimus (1784). Deverell's 1792 play Mary, Queen of Scots was apparently never performed. It was criticized in The Critical Review for its poor verse: "The blank verse of this lady is a mere business of typography; the ear has nothing to do with it; to turn it into prose you need only print it differently." However, a modern critic notes its "strong dramatic grasp of the complex minds of Mary and Elizabeth I." A further book of essays, addressed to women, appeared in the same year.

== Later life and death ==
Thereafter Deverell disappeared from public view. She died at Nailsworth, Gloucestershire in 1805. Her burial took place at Minchinhampton on 12 September.
