= Minchinhampton Common =

Site of Special Scientific Interest in Gloucestershire

- Site of Special Scientific Interest
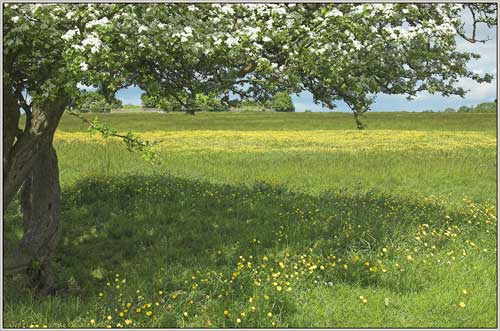
- Minchinhampton Common flowering

- Location within Gloucestershire
- Location of Minchinhampton Common.
- Area of search: Gloucestershire
- Grid reference: SO855010
- Coordinates: 51.707997°N 2.210522°W
- Interest: Biological/Geological
- Area: 182.7 ha (451 acres)
- Notification date: 1972

Minchinhampton Common (grid reference SO855010) is a 182.7-hectare (451-acre) biological and geological Site of Special Scientific Interest in Minchinhampton, Gloucestershire, England, notified in 1972.

The common has been owned and managed by the National Trust since 1913. It is one of the largest grassland commons in the Cotswold area. It is south of Rodborough Common SSSI. Both commons are on Jurassic limestone and are a central plateau with steep sides. They drop down to the Nailsworth Valley on the west side and the Frome Valley on the north side. The site designation includes the outlying areas of Iron Mills and Littleworth Commons. Neu-Lindsey Nature Reserve adjoins the western edge of Minchinhampton Common.

Minchinhampton Common is of both geological and biological importance. There are disused quarries near the centre which provide fossil evidence for research purposes. It is unimproved, herb-rich grassland. There are five units of assessment.

The limestone Longstone of Minchinhampton is supposedly the burial site of a Danish leader, and the area on the east side of the common known as Woefuldane Bottom has been suggested as a possible site of the Battle of Edington.

The Old Lodge, a former hunting lodge, stands at the centre of the common.

== History ==
There was a wood on the Common during the 1300s.

In 1739, Anglican preacher, George Whitefield delivered a sermon to 30,000 people. The Neolithic burial mound on the Common is known as Whitfield's Tump was named after him.

Those who own property within Minchinhampton Manor today, still have grazing rights on the Common, as was custom in the open-field system before enclosure.

== Geology ==
The quarries are one of the most important Bathonian (Middle Jurassic) research sites in the United Kingdom. The fossil Limestones provide examples of various marine species including bivalve and gastropod fauna including limpets and thick-shelled sea snails, coral, crustaceans, and reptiles. The site provides opportunities for significant further research on the local rock strata of the Minchinhampton and Burleigh limestones, and the relationship to the Bathonian successions to the east and south.

== Biology ==
=== Flora ===
The central plateau supports a short grassland sward (due to stock grazing) with longer vegetation on the steeper slopes. The grassland includes upright brome, tor-grass, sheep's fescue, quaking grass, and crested dog's-tail. Flowering herbs include common rock-rose, harebell, chalk milkwort, and field scabious. The area has a significant population of orchids, including the bee orchid, fragrant orchid, and frog orchid.

There are more neutral grasslands and herb species in areas of landslip on the margins of the site. There are wet areas which support marshy vegetation. There are also areas of scrub which is dominated by hawthorn, bramble, and dog rose. There is juniper on the site and a limited amount of broad-leaved woodland on the margins.

=== Fauna ===
The site is known for its variety of invertebrates and butterflies recorded are chalkhill blue, small blue, marsh fritillary and Duke of Burgundy fritillary. Moth records include cistus forester and juniper carpet.

The rare greater horseshoe bat is recorded as hibernating in the disused stone mines on the Nailsworth side.

=== Usage ===
There is a golf club and course. The grass is used to graze cattle in the warmer months, this is administered by the "hayward". Because of the cattle roaming free, there is a speed limit of 40 mph in the area. Part of the common was used to house a US military field hospital during WW2.

== Gallery ==
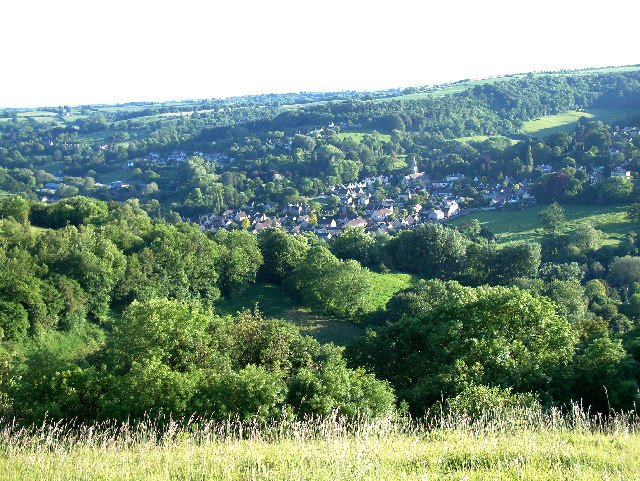
Looking west from Minchinhampton Common

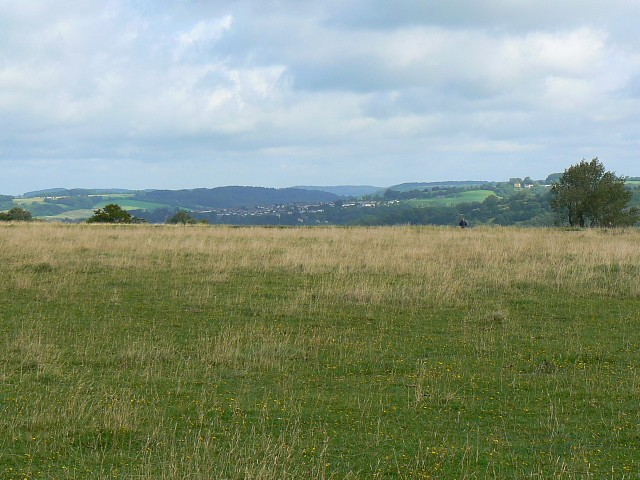
Minchinhampton Common

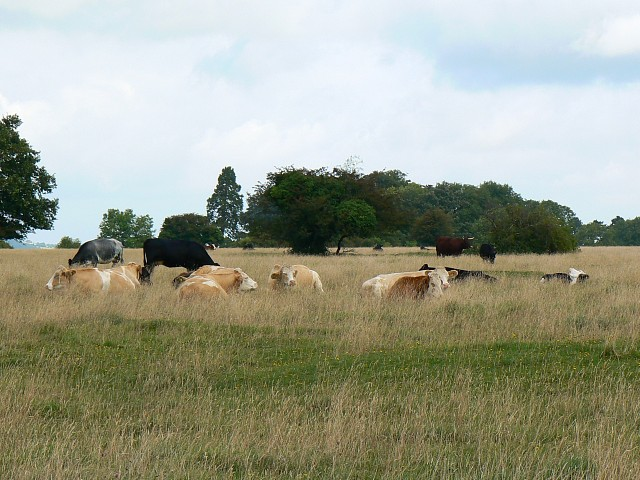
Cattle on Minchinhampton Common

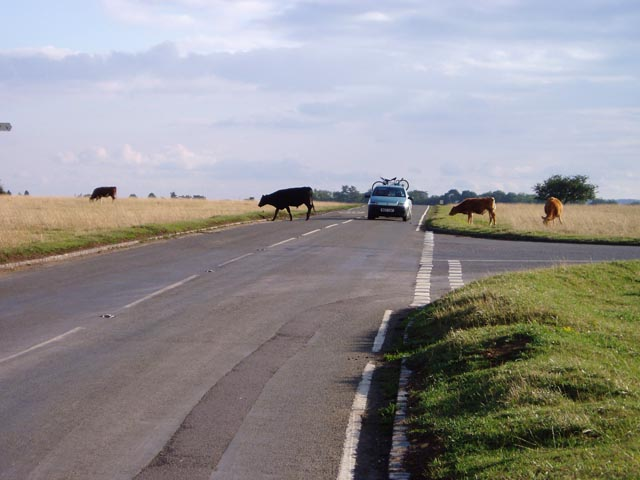
Road systems on Minchinhampton Common

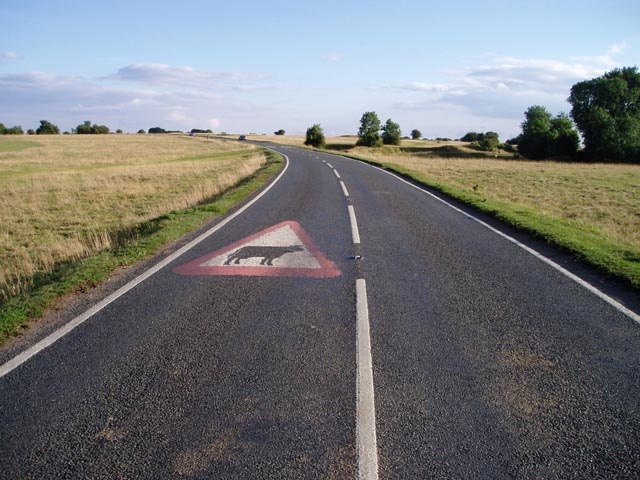
Road systems on Minchinhampton Common

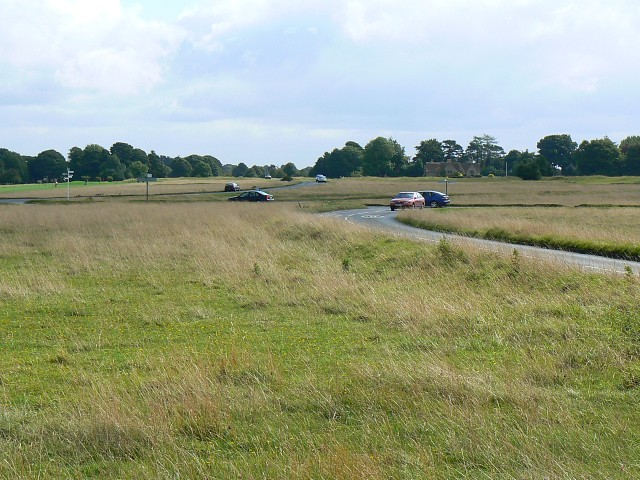
Road network on Minchinhampton Common

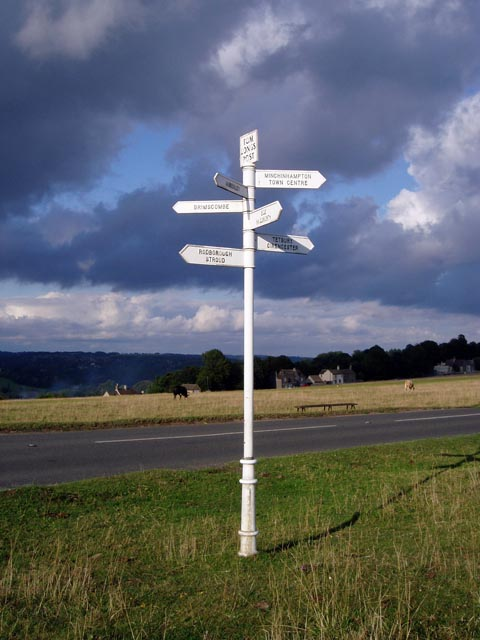
Directional post on Minchinhampton Common

== SSSI Source ==
- Natural England SSSI information on the citation
- Natural England SSSI information on the Minchinhampton units
