= Minchinhampton =

Town in Gloucestershire, England

Coordinates: 51°42′19″N 2°11′10″W

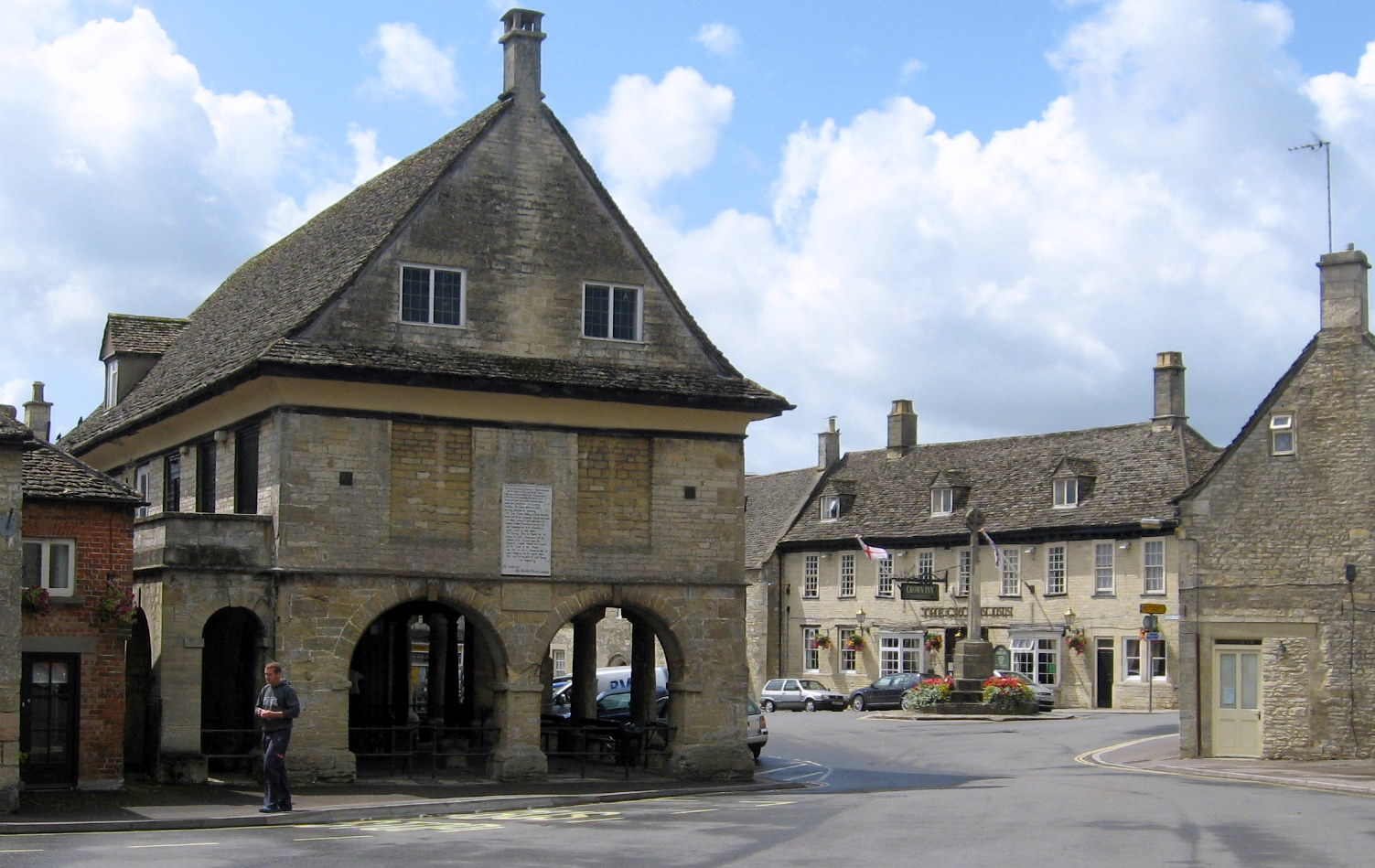
- Market Square

- Location within Gloucestershire
- Population: 4,519 (2021 Census)
- OS grid reference: SO871008
- Civil parish: Minchinhampton
- District: Stroud
- Shire county: Gloucestershire
- Region: South West
- Country: England
- Sovereign state: United Kingdom
- Post town: STROUD
- Postcode district: GL5, GL6
- Dialling code: 01453
- Police: Gloucestershire
- Fire: Gloucestershire
- Ambulance: South Western
- UK Parliament: Stroud & North Cotswolds

Minchinhampton is a Cotswolds market town and a civil parish in the Stroud District of Gloucestershire, South West England. The town is located on a hilltop, 4 miles (6.4 km) south-east of Stroud. Minchinhampton Common offers wide views over the Severn Estuary into Wales and further into the Cotswolds. It is an ancient town which was recorded in the Domesday Book.

== Toponymy ==
The place-name 'Minchinhampton' is first attested as Hantone in the Domesday Book of 1086. It appears as Minchenhamtone in the Assize Rolls of 1221. The name was originally the Old English Heatun, meaning "high town or settlement". The additional element is the Old English mynecen, meaning a nun, which is related to the modern word "monk". Minchinhampton at one time belonged to the nunnery in Caen in Normandy, France. Thus the name means "the nuns' high town or settlement". On a map of 1825 (published 1828) the town is labelled "Minching-Hampton" (see external links).

== Amenities and features ==
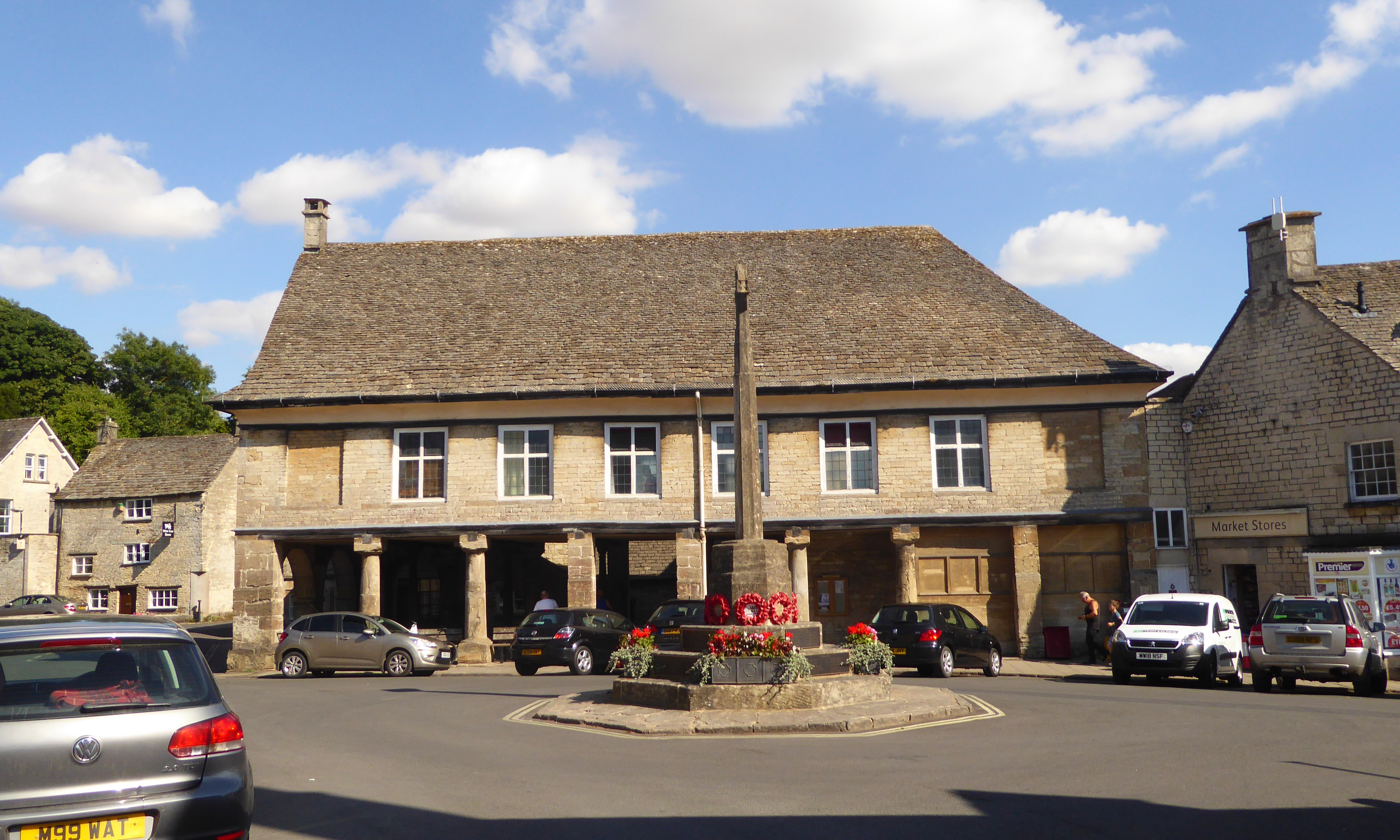
Minchinhampton Market House and War Memorial

The main square has a war memorial, and a 17th-century Market House, given to the town in 1919 by the Lord of the manor, Lt Col. H. G. Ricardo, and restored in 1944.

A market is held on the first Saturday of each month. There is a twice-yearly craft fair at Gatcombe and an annual summer visit by Gifford's Circus. Minchinhampton Country Fayre is held every other year in the High Street.

The small high street includes Henry's Dairy, The Amalfi coffee shop (previously 'The Kitchen'), The Crown Pub and Restaurant and a corner shop. There is also a post office, and Boots pharmacy. The Crown building dates back to 1715, where it was used for public meetings and assemblies before it became a beer house.

== History ==
Across the town, many plaques displaying 'West Country Ales- Best in the West- 1760' are situated on the walls of buildings. These were given to pubs at the time in relation to Stroud Brewery. In 1958, Stroud & Cheltenham Breweries merged to form West Country Breweries Ltd, and the plaques were replaced to say 'West Country Ales'. The 1760 date shown is in relation to the year that both Stroud Brewery and Cheltenham Brewery were established. These plaques can be seen outside The Crown, Market Place, Ram Inn (pub now closed), Swan Inn at West End (pub now closed), Trumpet Inn at West End (pub now closed).

== Sports facilities ==
=== Horse trials ===
Minchinhampton is near to the main home of the Princess Royal, Gatcombe Park, which hosts the Gatcombe Horse Trials in late summer each year.

=== Rugby ===
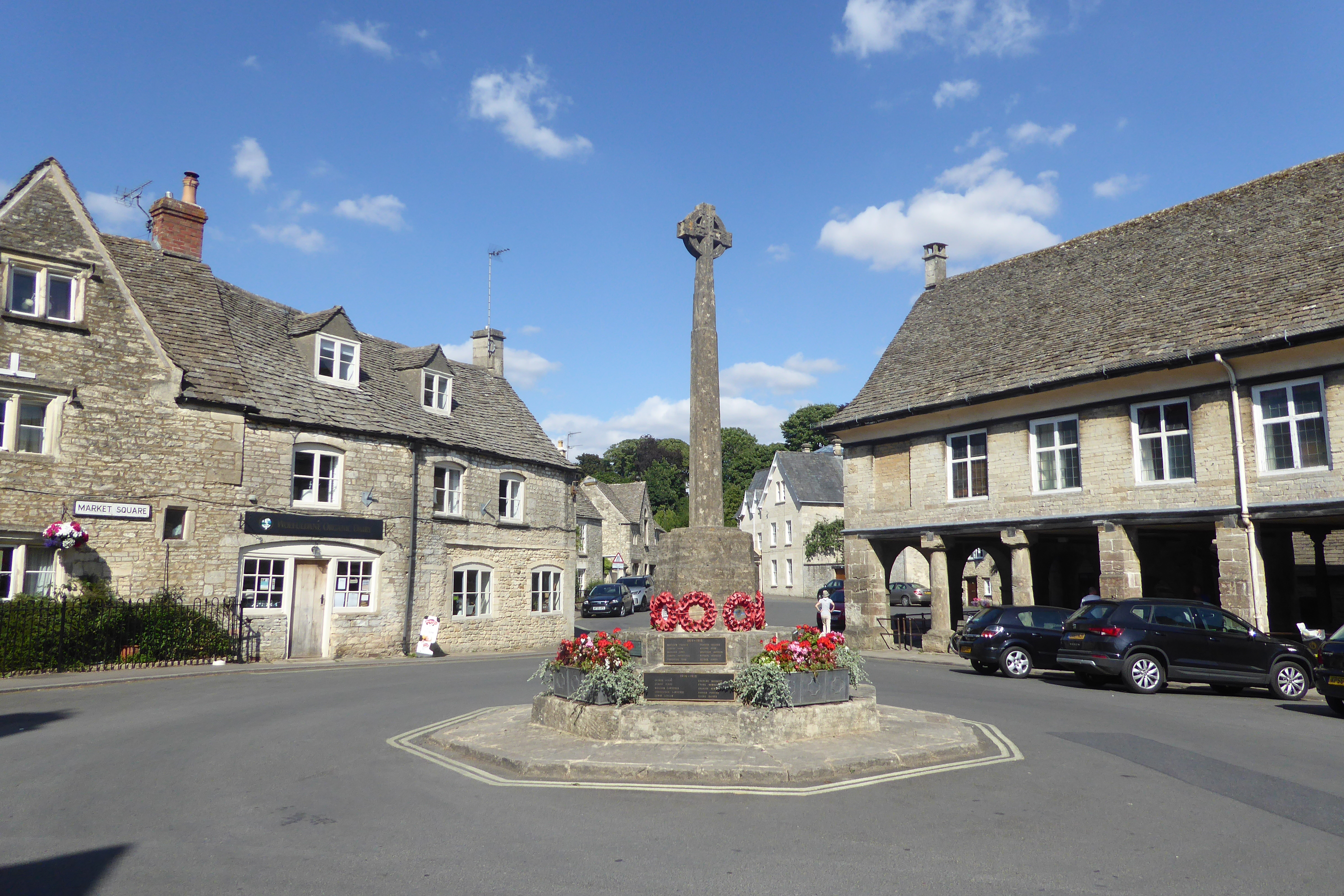
The Minchinhampton war memorial

The rugby club has three adult teams, minis and juniors from under 6 to under 16, and a large touch-rugby section. Minchinhampton RFC plays in the league Gloucester 2 North. In 2014, the club's players were joined by Gatcombe Park resident Mike Tindall, a 2003 Rugby World Cup winner and ex-England and Gloucester RFC rugby international married to Zara Phillips, the daughter of the Princess Royal.

=== Golf ===
Minchinhampton Golf Club has three courses. The Cherington and Avening courses lie near villages of the same names, south-east of Minchinhampton. The Old Course is on Minchinhampton Common.

=== Football ===
The Minchinhampton Rangers are a Youth Football Club for boys and girls, aged 5 to 17. It was founded in 1998 and have over 300 registered players.

=== Tennis ===
The Minchinhampton Tennis Club is situated on the Stuart Playing Fields in Minchinhampton. The Team often competes in regional/national events.

== Media ==
Local news and television programmes are provided by BBC West and ITV West Country. Television signals are received from the Mendip TV transmitter. Local radio stations are BBC Radio Gloucestershire, Heart West and Greatest Hits Radio South West. The town is served by the local newspapers: Stroud News & Journal and Gloucester Citizen.

== Governance ==
The Minchinhampton electoral ward stretches eastwards to Aston Down. It had a population of 4,357 according to the 2011 census. The town is twinned with Nkokoto, Tanzania.

In the 2024 General Election, Minchinhampton was part of the North Cotswolds Constituency.

== Churches ==
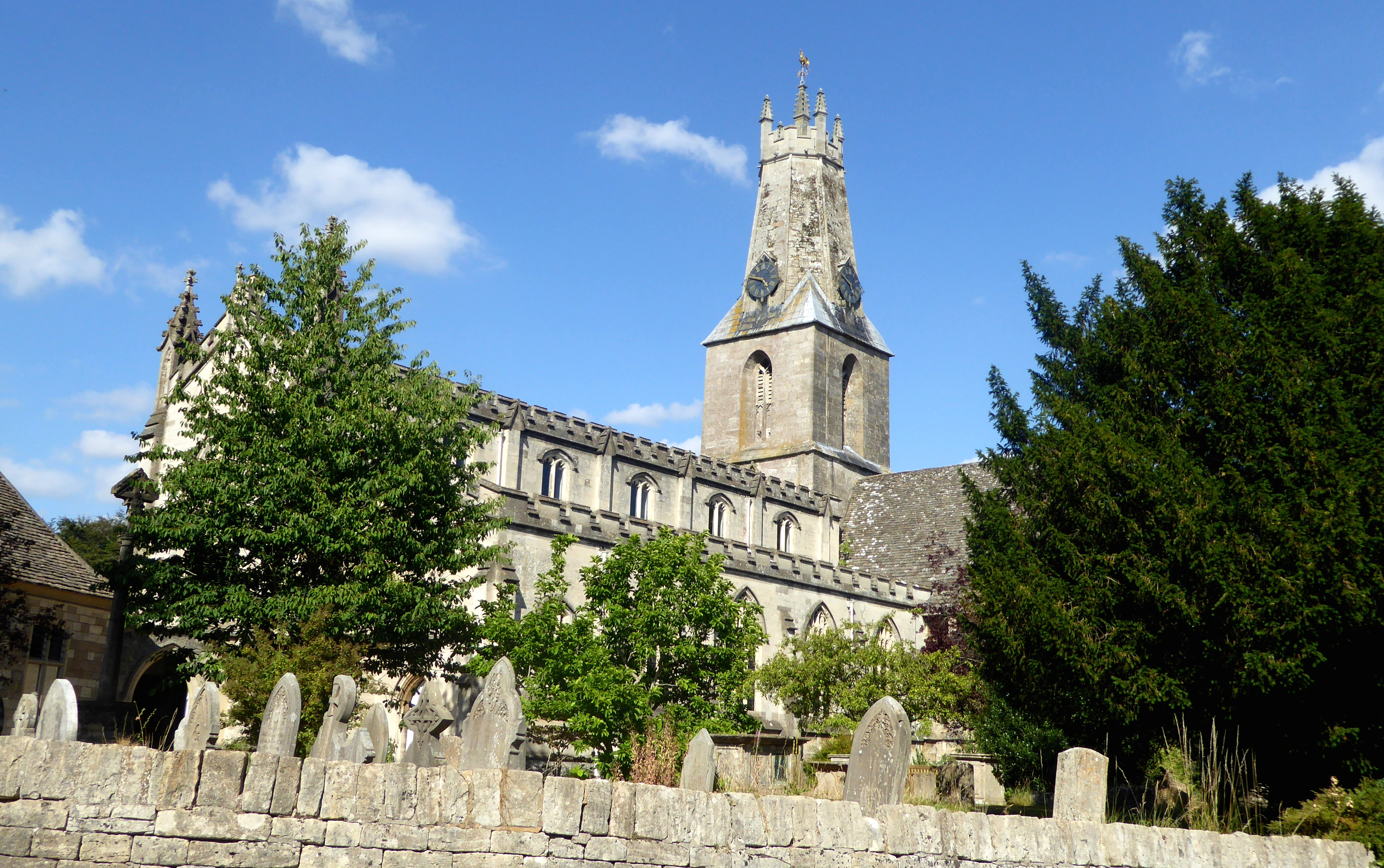
Holy Trinity Church, Minchinhampton, with its unusual 'coronet' tower

Minchinhampton has two places of worship: the Anglican parish church, Holy Trinity, and Minchinhampton Baptist Church.

The spire of the parish church was pulled down for safety reasons in 1563, after the nave arches supporting it were found to be failing. The stub was then surmounted by a coronet structure. James Bradley, the third Astronomer Royal, was buried in the churchyard in 1762.

Minchinhampton Baptist Church in Tetbury Street dates from 1834. The original Chapel Lane Baptist chapel, dating from 1765, is now a private house.

A Roman Catholic chapel, dedicated to St Thomas More & St John Fisher, was located at Church End, Hampton Green from 1936 to 1973.

== Minchinhampton Common ==
Minchinhampton Common is a 580-acre (230 ha) common used by walkers and golfers, and is designated a Site of Special Scientific Interest. It has been owned by the National Trust since 1913, but only managed by it since 2000. It has long, parallel ditches and mounds known as the Bulwarks, which formed part of a large Iron Age fort. There are wide views from the Common, west over the Severn estuary into Wales, and east to the Golden Valley and further into the Cotswolds.

The limestone Longstone of Minchinhampton is supposedly the burial site of a Danish leader. As a standing stone it more probably dates back to the Bronze Age.

The Common is also well known in the local area for its cows and wild horses, which use the land to graze from May to October. These animals are also free to roam the town itself, often resulting in traffic and tourists.

== Aston Down ==
Minchinhampton is close to the former Royal Air Force airfield, Aston Down, formerly a major employer, but now closed and used only for gliding. In 2005, after a Freedom of Information request, the local newspaper revealed that Aston Down is contaminated with arsenic, hydrocarbons and radium. Since the site lies above a vulnerable aquifer, local residents have formed an Aston Down Action Group aimed at persuading local and central government agencies to implement more stringent safety regulations.

== Discoveries ==
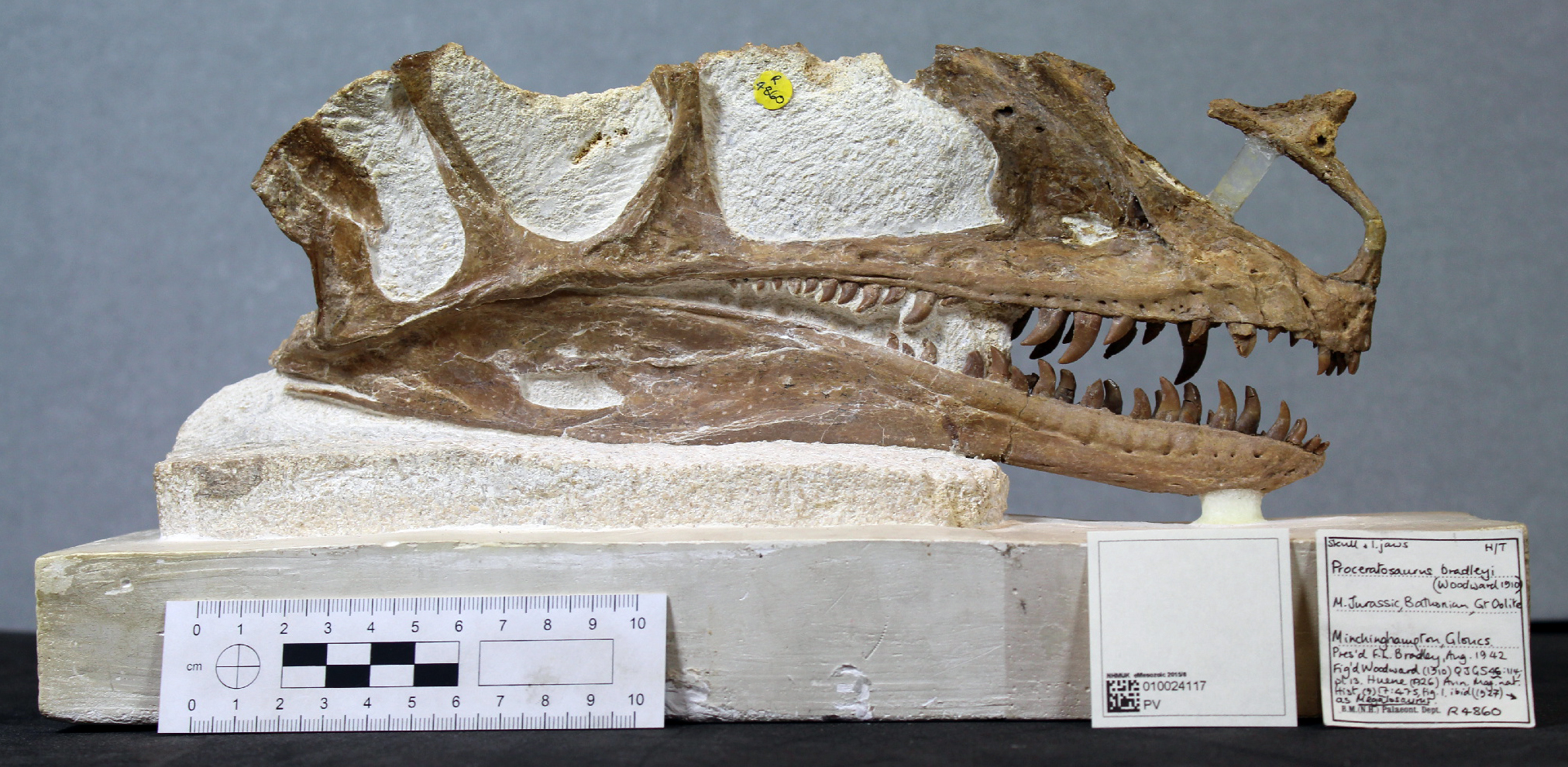
Holotype and only known specimen of Proceratosaurus bradleyi, collected from Minchinhampton Reservoir

One of the world's oldest tyrannosaurs, Proceratosaurus, was excavated from Minchinhampton reservoir. The only known example of it is now in the Natural History Museum, London.

== Notable residents ==
In birth order:

- James Bradley (1693–1762), astronomer and university professor, was buried here. His grave is marked by the James Bradley Monument in Minchinhampton Church.
- Mary Deverell (1731–1805), religious writer and poet, was born and buried here.
- David Ricardo (1772-1823), British economist lived and died at Gatcombe Park
- Jolly John Nash (1828–1901), born here and became a music hall entertainer in London.
- Flora Annie Steel (1847–1929), writer, died in Minchinhampton.
- Aubrey Mather (1885–1958), actor who appeared in many British and American films, was born here.
- Jenny Joseph (1932–2018), poet, lived in the town.
- Joanna Trollope (1943-2025), writer, born here.
- Anne, Princess Royal (born 1950), lives in Gatcombe Park.
- Keith Allen (born 1953), actor, lives in the parish.
- Robert Addie (1960–2003), actor – his ashes are interred in Holy Trinity churchyard.
