= Stroud News & Journal =

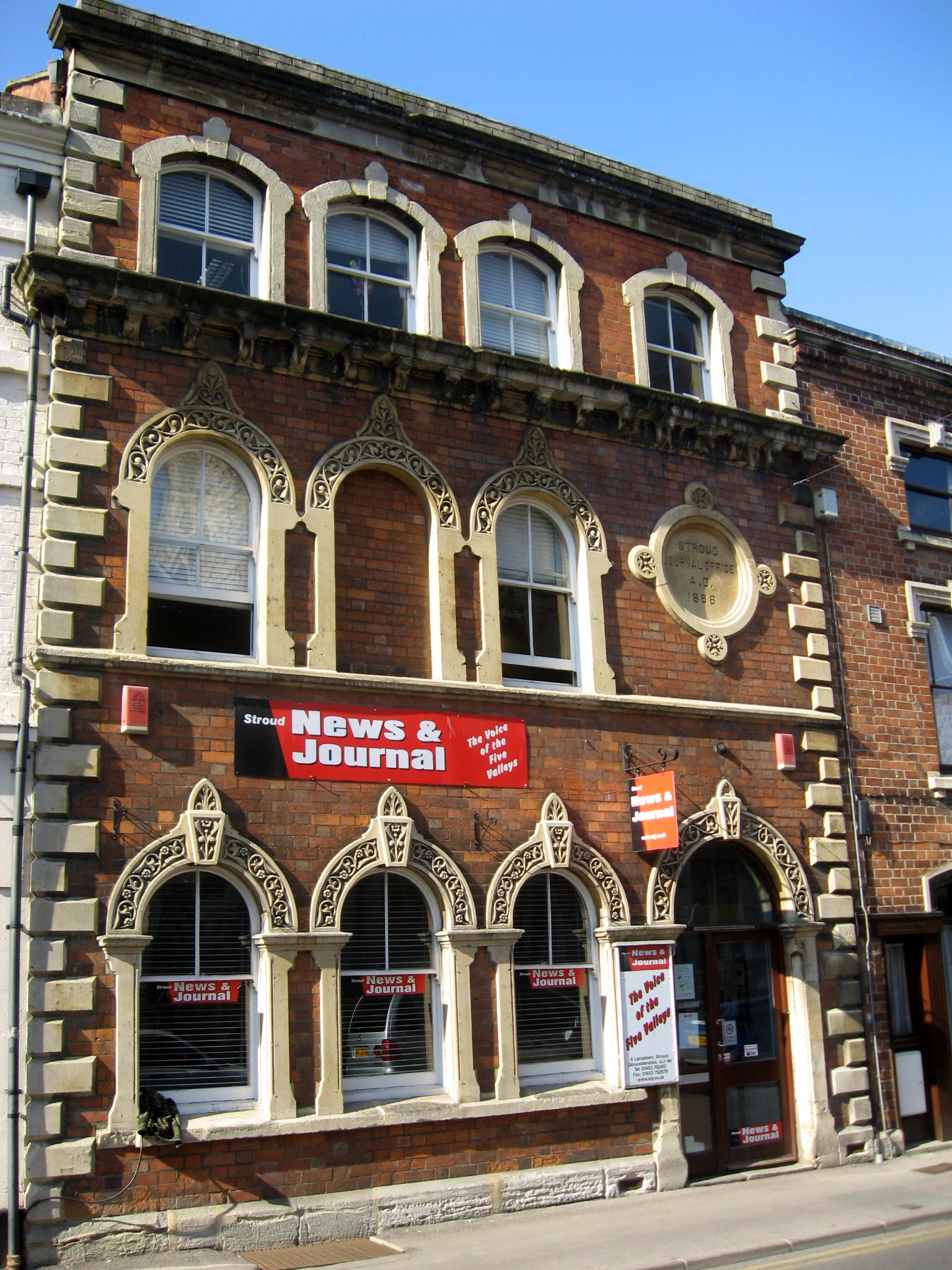
- Stroud News & Journal headquarters in Lansdown, Stroud
- Type: Weekly newspaper
- Owner: Newsquest
- Founded: 1957
- Circulation: 3,483 (as of 2023)
- Website: stroudnewsandjournal.co.uk

The Stroud News & Journal is a weekly paid-for newspaper based in Stroud, Gloucestershire. It is published every Wednesday in a tabloid format by Newsquest and covers a large portion of the Stroud district, including the towns of Stroud, Minchinhampton, Nailsworth, Stonehouse, Painswick and Chalford, and their surrounding villages.

== History ==
The SNJ, as it often refers to itself in print, was amalgamated in 1957 from the Stroud News and the Stroud Journal.

== Demographics and statistics ==
The SNJ has a circulation of ppl around 10,000 weekly copies, as circulation has dropped by 25-30% pa. Since the last audited number of 19,000 in 2004 ABC statistics indicate a readership of 46,880 roughly 2.5 readers per copy, with the readership split evenly between the socio-economic groups and age ranges.
