= Emma Bridgewater =

British ceramic company

Emma Bridgewater Limited
- Type: Private
- Industry: Ceramics
- Founded: 1985; 41 years ago
- Founder: Emma Bridgewater
- Website: www.emmabridgewater.co.uk

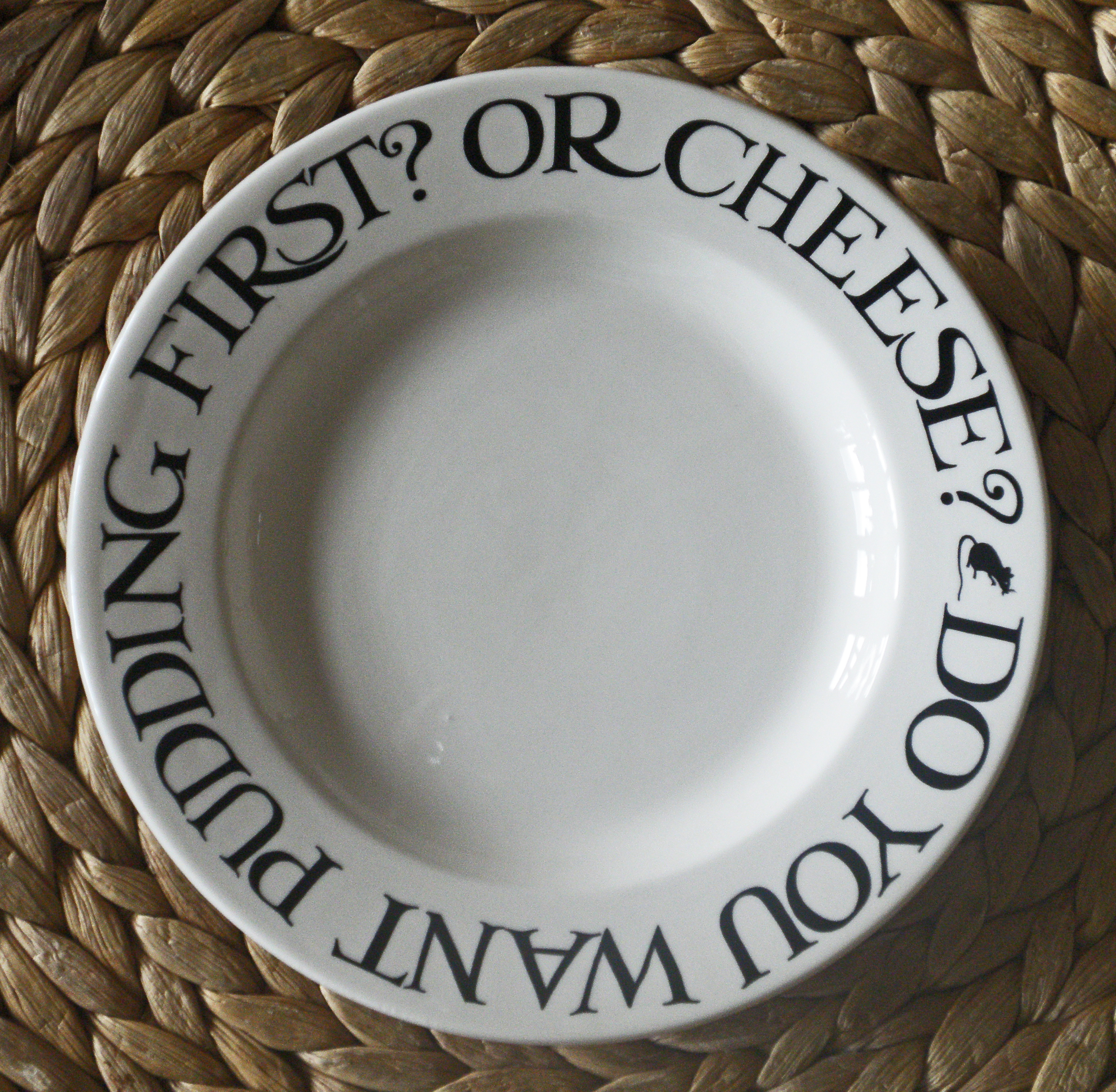
A plate made by the company

Emma Bridgewater is a British ceramics manufacturing company founded in 1985 by Emma Bridgewater. The company specialises in earthenware tableware, manufactured in Stoke-on-Trent, England. The pottery is produced using traditional techniques. The company is one of the largest pottery manufacturers based entirely in the UK.

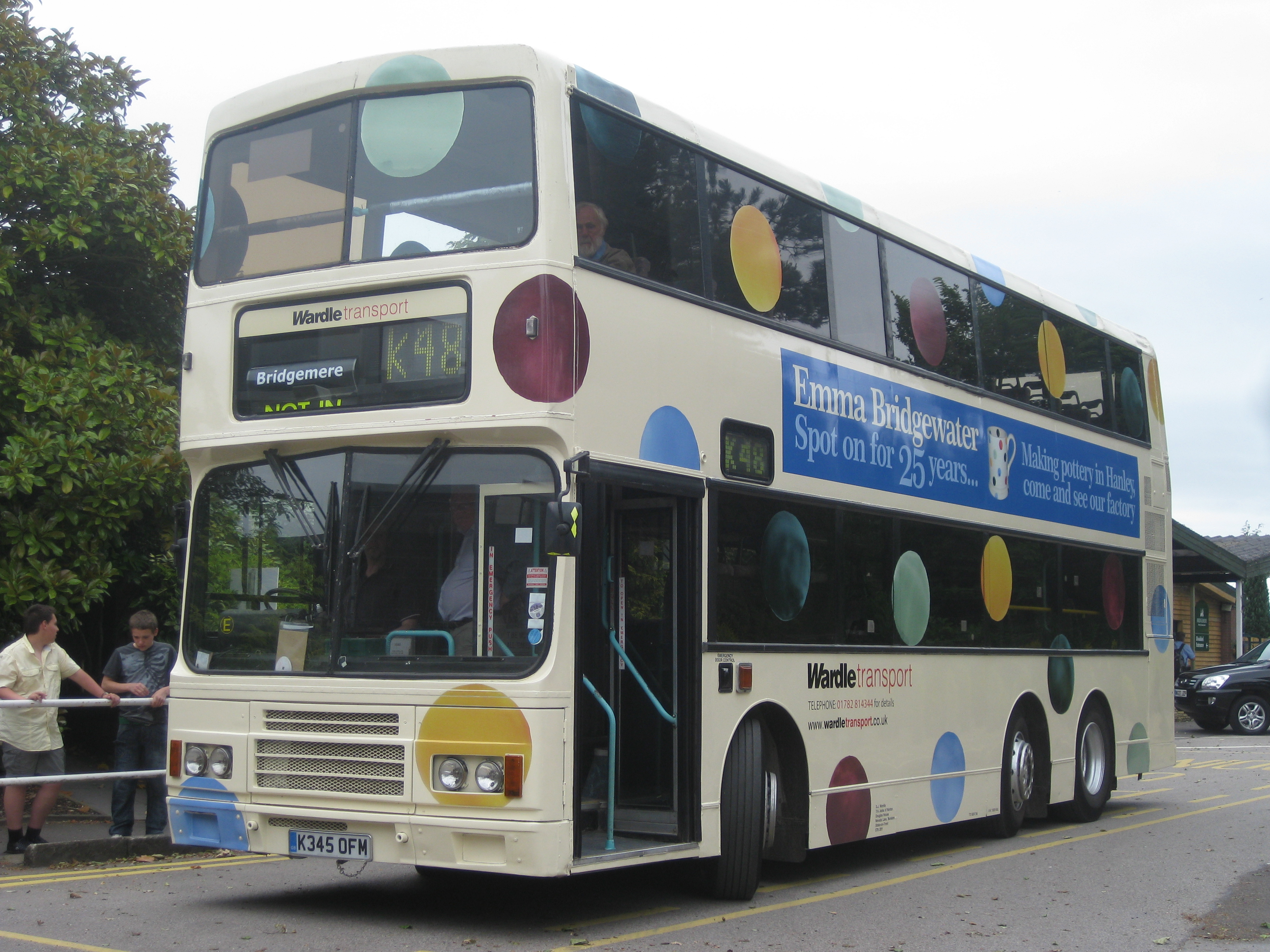
Bus with Emma Bridgewater livery

There are two Emma Bridgewater shops in London as well as two outlet stores, located at the company's factory in Hanley, Stoke-on-Trent, and in Bicester Village, Oxfordshire respectively.

The company has been certified as a B-Corporation since January 2022.

== History ==
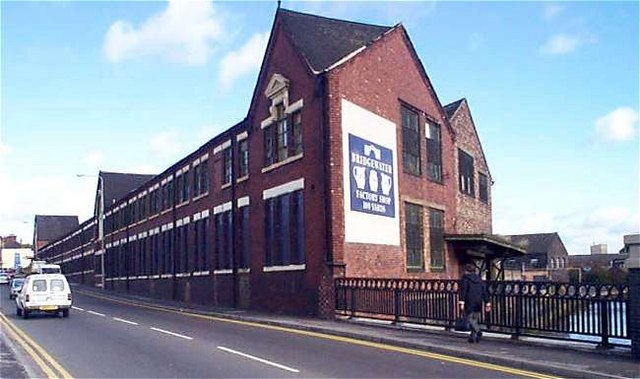
Bridgewater Pottery Works, Eastwood, Hanley

The company was founded by Emma Bridgewater in 1985 when being unable to find a suitable cup and saucer for a gift for her mother she decided to create her own. Drawing four shapes, a mug, a bowl, a jug and a dish, samples were created in Stoke-on-Trent.

In 1995, the company purchased a former Victorian factory site in Hanley, Stoke-on-Trent, and converted the site. Production began there in 1996.

During a royal visit, Bridgewater discussed the brand's launch of its biggest ever collection of Royal commemorative ware to celebrate Queen Elizabeth II's Diamond Jubilee in 2012. Catherine, Princess of Wales, made an official visit to the factory in 2015.

In its first year the company had a turnover of around £30,000. By 2009 this had increased to almost £8 million, and £11 million in 2010, employing 180 people. According to their website, in 2022 around 230 people worked their factory and produce 1.7 million pieces annually.

== Products and Production ==
Emma Bridgewater earthenware is manufactured using "traditional techniques of manufacture and decoration", for example decoration is hand-applied using sponges, brushes and transfers. The earthenware is produced using mould casting, before being fettled and sponged, and then fired. Decoration is then applied using either sponge painting or lithographing. Sponge painted decoration was a historically common technique in the British pottery industry, but had fallen out of manufacturing practice until it was revived by the company in the 1980s. The polka dot pattern is one prominent Emma Bridgewater design created using this technique.

Emma Bridgewater also produces a range of homeware and gifts. The company's pottery designs are adapted for application onto textiles, glass, tin, stationery, and melamine.

== "Festival in a Factory" ==
Aerial view of Emma Bridgewater

For the last few years, the Emma Bridgewater factory in Stoke-on-Trent has been the home to the "Festival in a Factory", a 3-day literary festival where a number of authors, politicians, artists and celebrities give public lectures. Recent speakers have included Mary Portas, Viv Groskop, Elizabeth Day, Christopher Eccleston, Lauren Child, AN Wilson, historian Tom Holland, author Ben Macintyre, historian Andrew Roberts, Rachel Reeves MP, Greenpeace UK's Will McCallum, biographer Jenny Uglow, the National Trust's Nino Strachey, the V&A Museum's Oriole Cullen and Claire Wilcox, and novelist Deborah Moggach.

The 2020 Festival, planned for 4–6 June, was cancelled as a result of the COVID-19 pandemic.

The head gardener of the factory garden is the author and broadcaster Arthur Parkinson.

== Bibliography ==
- Toast & marmalade and other stories. London: Saltyard Books. 2014. ISBN 978-1-44473-491-1.
- Pattern. London: Saltyard Books. 2016. ISBN 978-1-44473-494-2.
