= Nell Gifford =

British circus director

- Photo by Ramones Karaoke
- Born: Eleanor Rose Stroud; 24 January 1973; Oxford, England
- Died: 8 December 2019 (aged 46); Gloucester, England
- Education: New College, Oxford
- Occupation: Circus director
- Known for: founding and running Giffords Circus
- Spouse: Toti Gifford
- Children: two

Nell Gifford (born Eleanor Rose Stroud; 24 January 1973 – 8 December 2019) was a writer and the founding director of Giffords Circus.

== Life ==
Gifford was born in Oxford in 1973. Her parents were Charlotte (born Pumphrey) and Richard Peter (Rick) Stroud. Her father was a television director and producer and the second husband of her mother who had been Charlotte Bridgewater. Nell had three half-siblings including the designer Emma Bridgewater. Her mother encouraged her children to have a long childhood.

She fell in love with horses and was educated at a convent school, before she went on to New College, Oxford. Her university place was put on hold for a year after her mother was in a riding accident that sent her into a coma; although she came round she never recovered. Gifford spent a gap year at the Circus Flora in St. Louis Missouri, set up in the mid-1980s. She completed her degree in English and went to work in circuses. She had a hard time at one circus but she persevered and became a ringmaster at the French Santus Circus. Gifford wrote her story of being someone who works in a circus but was not born into a circus family. These people are named Jossers and her book was Josser: The Secret Life of a Circus Girl.

In 2000 she married a farmer's son named Toti Gifford, and they set up Giffords Circus. The marriage ended after they had twins.

In 2003 she published her second book. This was a children's book about one of the founders of the original circus, Philip Astley. Her book was titled Sgt. Major Philip Astley: Inventor of the Circus.

She developed her circus to meet modern tastes. She was awarded a £10,000 grant by the Jerwood Foundation and that enabled more people to be involved with producing a show. Three important women were involved; they were the horsewoman Rebecca Townsend and her pony, the trapeze artist Emily Park on the trapeze and Isabelle Woywode. In the following year, 2004, Giffords Circus had their first themed show, "Pearl".

She knew five years before she died that she had breast cancer and in time she was given a year to live, after it was discovered that it had spread. She described cancer as "boring" and lived her last months between hospital appointments and continuing to appear in her circus albeit with her cropped hair covered by a large blond wig. One of her last enthusiasms was painting which she discovered while recreating a Picasso on the side of a circus van. In a year she created sixty paintings which were later auctioned.

Gifford died of cancer in 2019 and her niece took over the circus. Gifford's younger sister Clover Stroud later wrote a book about their life together, The Red of My Blood.
