= Giffords Circus =

Traditional English circus

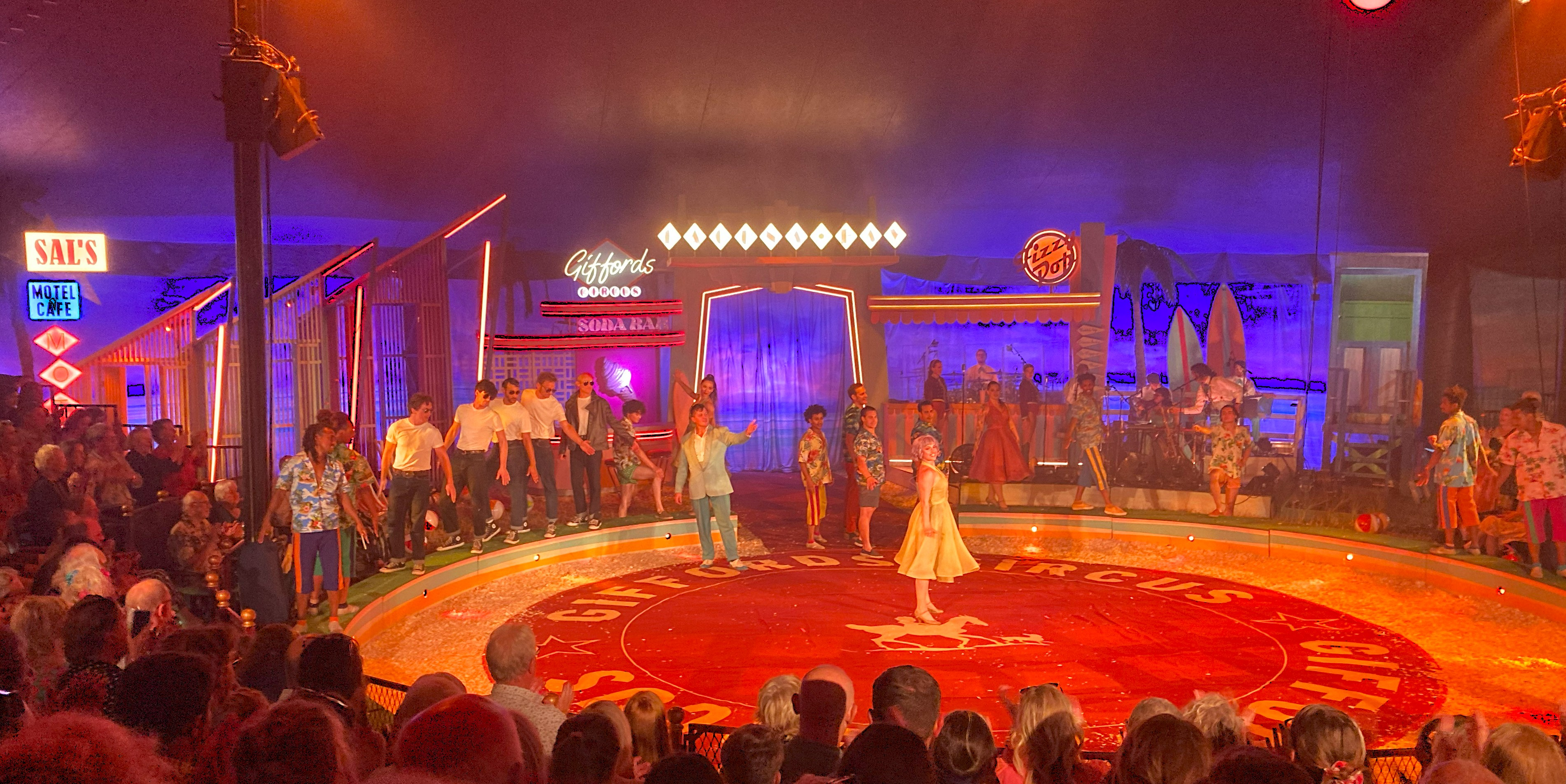
- Giffords Circus on Minchinhampton Common

Origin
- Country: England
- Founder(s): Nell and Toti Gifford
- Year founded: 2000

Information
- Director: Cal McCrystal (2012 onwards)
- Website: https://giffordscircus.com/

Giffords Circus is a traditional English circus that tours the Cotswolds and south of England every summer, also performing at Chiswick House. The circus features a wide mixture of performer types from various nations, including acrobatics, aerialist and trapeze artistes, tight-rope walkers, stunt riders, opera singers, dancers, clowns, illusionists, and more.

Founded in 2000 by Nell Gifford and her then husband Toti Gifford, the circus has continued to tour yearly (excluding 2020 due to the COVID-19 pandemic) in the summer months since its beginning. Each year the circus has a different theme, with its latest edition being "Waterfield", which creates a magical rendition of the English countryside and the animals that live within it.

== History ==
=== Creation ===
Giffords Circus was established by Nell Gifford and her then husband Toti Gifford, who met in their early twenties. At eighteen, Nell ran away with the circus, moving to the United States to work alongside her brother in-law, before working on several other circuses. After meeting Toti, Nell began working with a circus in Germany, and Toti moved to Germany with her, where they were inspired to create their own circus. They therefore began Giffords Circus in 2000, using friends and travellers to help, a converted shepherds hut as a box office, and a round white-tent they bought from a newspaper ad for their first appearance at Hay Festival.

=== Introduction of themes ===
Originally, Giffords Circus mirrored a traditional 1930's village green circus. From 2004 onwards, each tour has followed a different theme. Some recent examples have included "Carpa", a Mexican theme, "Xanadu", a 1960's hippie theme, and "Laguna", which was based around 1950's America. The most recent theme was "Waterfield" which was set around the English countryside and the animals that live within it.

=== Death of Nell Gifford ===
Nell Gifford died in 2019, aged 46, following a battle with breast cancer that had spread to her bones and lymph nodes. Following this, the circus was then managed by her niece, known as Lil Rice, between 2019 and 2021, with Guy James taking over as CEO. Toti Gifford replaced James as CEO in 2025, who remains involved with the circus.

== Performers ==
Performers within the circus come from many different countries and can widely vary in speciality. Some performer types seen at the circus have included acrobatics, aerialist and trapeze artistes, tight-rope walkers, stunt riders, opera singers, dancers, clowns, illusionists, and more. Several performers have performed at Giffords circus repetitively throughout different tours. One regular was Alan Digweed, performing as "Tweedy the Clown", who joined in 2004 and continued touring with Giffords Circus until taking a break from performing in the show from 2024 onwards.

The circus also features animals, such as horses and geese.

== Tours ==
- 2004: "Pearl"
- 2005: "The Cockerel"
- 2006: "Joplin": with a 1960s theme
- 2008: "Caravan": set in a horse fair around 1900
- 2010: "Yasmine": inspired by the life of equestrienne Yasmine Smart, who played herself in the production
- 2011: "War and Peace": themed around Napoleon's disastrous intrusion into Russia, seen through the eyes of a Russian aristocratic family
- 2012: "The Saturday Book"
- 2013: "Lucky 13": based on the culture clash resulting from a high art opera- and ballet-themed circus show that is gatecrashed by a rowdy Transylvanian travelling circus
- 2014: "The Thunders": with the Greek Gods as its theme
- 2015: "Moon Songs": blending cultural images of the moon with the story of two young Ethiopian jugglers dreaming of fame
- 2016: "The Painted Wagon": centred on a group of 19th-century American homesteaders
- 2017: "Any Port in a Storm": with maritime themes, and telling the story of the circus visiting the 17th-century Spanish court
- 2018: "My Beautiful Circus": celebrating 250 years of the invention of the circus as an art form
- 2019: "Xanadu": with a 1960s hippie "Summer of Love" theme
- 2020: "The Feast": a non-touring show due to the COVID-19 pandemic
- 2021: "The Hooley" was an Irish dance themed show.
- 2022: "Carpa" had a Mexican theme.
- 2023: "Les Enfants Du Paradis".
- 2024: "Avalon" had an Arthurian theme
- 2025: "Laguna" has a 1950s America theme
- 2026: "Waterfield"
