= Laurie Hislam =

Laurence Hislam (1909 – 26 August 1966) was an English peace activist. Hislam's anti-war feelings and activism developed from about 1938, first in the Peace Pledge Union working with Basque child refugees from the Spanish Civil War. His first notable individual activism was in 1939, when he released "rubber ball bombs" from a suitcase, causing chaos in Downing Street, for which he served one month hard labour. As an anarchist conscientious objector in WWII he served periods of imprisonment, wrote for War Commentary (Freedom Press) and distributed anti-war literature. In 1945 he joined The London Forum discussion group and later worked for the Freedom Defence Committee in London. In 1951 Hislam moved to Gloucestershire, where he continued with anti-war protests and activism including having his head shaved in 1964 and 1965 for a vigil to commemorate the dropping of a nuclear bomb on Hiroshima, many local CND demonstrations and a pilgrimage to Rome hoping to influence Pope John XXIII to condemn nuclear weapons. He was a founder member of the Committee of 100 and took part in many CND protests. He was killed in a car crash in 1966.

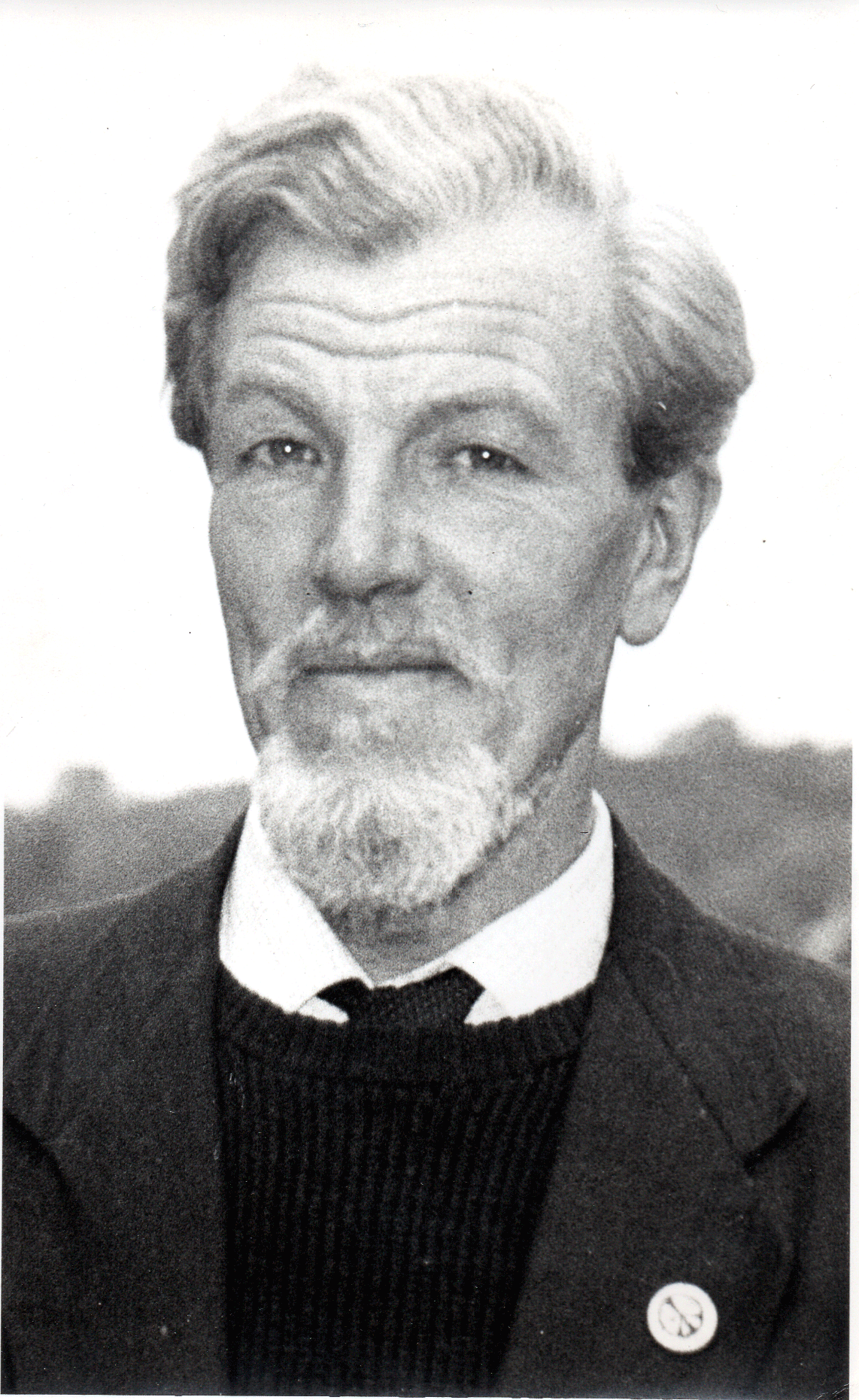
Family photo of Laurie

== Early life ==
Hislam was born in 1909, the second of four children in a working-class family in Camberwell, South East London. His father worked in transport, including driving horse-drawn and then steam-powered buses.

Until he was 28 Laurie lived a carefree existence. He was a conventional white-collar worker and his Denmark Hill tennis club, cricket team and its social activities occupied his free time. Then in 1938 he was confronted with peace posters outside Whitfield's Tabernacle in Rye Lane, Peckham, which changed his entire way of life. "War means total destruction." "War solves nothing." "It is the responsibility of each individual to see that it never happens again." The posters were part of an awareness campaign by the Peace Pledge Union (PPU), which Laurie joined. He became involved with the care of Basque child refugees who were living in a house in Langham, Essex, sponsored by the PPU. He kept in contact with two of the refugees after they returned to Spain in 1940.

On 28 August 1939, when war was imminent, Hislam went to 10 Downing Street, and opened a suitcase containing painted rubber balls. A photograph shows Hislam being hustled away by police after being injured by angry members of the crowd in Downing Street. There resulted the first of many prison sentences, one month's hard labour. He was invited by the BBC to appear on television to explain why he had done what he did. The incident and its reporting were reprised in The Sunday Times colour supplement on 27 August 1989 in a section on "Fifty Years ago today".

== World War II ==
Hislam expressed his opinion at London's Speaker's Corner. He registered as a conscientious objector and attended a tribunal, consisting mainly of retired military men. He was vociferous about his pacifist beliefs, confirmation of his registration was refused, and he became liable for military service. He evaded the authorities for a while, continuing anti-war activities, and then went underground under an assumed name.

Within the PPU Hislam belonged to the dissident Forward Movement of anarchists, with John Hewetson and Frederick Lohr. He wrote and distributed anarchist leaflets, including Enemies of the People, published December 1941 in War Commentary by Freedom Press. Through Lohr he met his future wife, Winifred: they lived with him and other anarchists in Westbourne Terrace, London. In 1947 he was working for the Freedom Defence Committee publishing the FDC Bulletin at the time George Woodcock was secretary.

Lohr, Winifred and other members of the London Forum converted to Catholicism under the guidance of Jesuit priests of the Farm Street church, but Laurie was not convinced that he could be both Catholic and pacifist. By 1951 the couple had three daughters and moved to Gloucestershire.

== In Gloucestershire ==
Hislam lived near Stroud, Gloucestershire, where he worked as a clerk and later a postman. Winifred was a trained teacher and became the main breadwinner. During the fifties Laurie was confirmed a Catholic by William E. Orchard, the pacifist parish priest of St Mary of the Angels Church, Brownshill. In 1957 the couple bought a plot of land and Laurie built, single-handedly, a three-bedroomed wooden bungalow for the growing family. He took 'single-handed' to the extreme of making his own concrete blocks for the foundations as well as learning the skills of plumber and electrician. In 1957, while working on the construction, he was visited by Chelo and Chivvi, two of the Basque refugee children he had sponsored in 1938, now married and living in Bilbao.

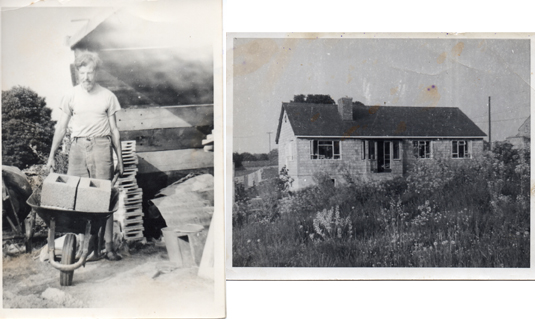
Making concrete block + house completed

The site of the house was chosen for its position near the Catholic St Mary of the Angels Church at Brownshill. This was the church built for a lay community of Dominican nuns, for whom Hislam worked for a time as a gardener. In the cellar of the bungalow he set up a pottery, building his own wheel and kiln. He sold pots at markets in the West Country. He was a friend of the peace activist John Papworth, whom he had met when both were in prison following an anti-war demonstration and who also had a house in Gloucestershire at this time. Through his work for the Movement for Colonial Freedom, Papworth became a friend, and later personal assistant, of Kenneth Kaunda and he took Kaunda to meet Laurie and his family in Brownshill.

By the time of Hislam's death in 1966, he and Winifred had six daughters aged from 19 to 2.

== CND and Committee of 100 ==
Laurie was a member of the Direct Action Committee that preceded the formation of the Campaign for Nuclear Disarmament. He was arrested and jailed for taking part in the DAC nonviolent protest against all nuclear armaments at Harrington rocket base (Northants) 2 January 1960. A report in the PAX Bulletin refers to a photo on the front page of The Observer that included Laurie at the protest. He took part in the first march to Aldermaston in 1958 (organised by DAC) and subsequent CND Aldermaston or other Easter Marches until his death in 1966. He was a founder member of the Committee of 100 and retained a lifelong commitment to nonviolent civil disobedience, often at a local level (by which time he was living in Gloucestershire). He was a long time associate of Pat Arrowsmith and family papers include correspondence with Hugh Brock and Bertrand Russell. Russell expressed support for Laurie in all his local pacifist activities and his action in writing to John F Kennedy, Harold Macmillan and Nikita Khrushchev in 1962 to protest against their recent nuclear tests. He received a reply from Macmillan. In March 1961 Ralph Schoenman visited Laurie in Gloucestershire and the two planned the breakaway 'Grosvenor Square' demonstration while walking with the family in the wild daffodil fields of Dymock. This was a breakaway from the main CND march from Aldermaston to Trafalgar Square. Hislam and Schoenman led a group of protesters who sat down in front of the American Embassy. Both were arrested and later fined 40 shillings with 10 guineas costs at Marlborough Street Magistrates' Court. On 17 September 1961 Laurie was arrested and jailed for his part in a mass sit-down organised by the Committee of 100 in Trafalgar Square. In 1963 Laurie travelled to Berlin with four other Gloucestershire peace campaigners. They distributed leaflets near 'Checkpoint Charlie' and Laurie crossed briefly to East Berlin before being expelled.

== Local Activism in Stroud ==
Laurie was an active member of Stroud CND and initiated many small activisms of his own. He courted publicity in the local press (report extracts below) in order to get his message across to the people of Stroud. He lost no opportunity to have discussions with all and sundry about his beliefs and became known affectionately as Stroud's "Ban the bomb man".

=== Demand for C.D. cash fraudulent, he says ===
"A prominent member of the Stroud branch of CND protested today to Stroud magistrates against a rate demand for Civil Defence purposes. Laurence A Hislam was summoned for failing to pay 2s 3d. He said "I believe that the council are levying this money fraudulently in so far as they are taking money for a service which it is physically impossible for them to carry out – namely, for protection of the inhabitants of Stroud in time of nuclear war"" Evening Post, 23 September 1960

=== Protest at sale of goods to pay rates ===
"When a wheel barrow and a lawn mower, which Stroud RDC had seized, were put up for auction, the owner Mr Laurence Hislam, was there to protest and hand out leaflets. The articles were impounded because Mr Hislam, a member of CND, had refused to pay the Civil Defence portion of his rates. He claimed the council were taking money for a service they could not provide." Gloucester Citizen, 3 June 1961

=== Stroud nuclear disarmer jailed again ===
"Laurence Hislam of Brownshill, Stroud, the nuclear disarmer and member of the Committee of 100 was jailed for 14 days by Stroud Magistrates for failing to pay £6 4s. 3d. of his rates. In defence he said he had refused to pay the portion of his rates allocated to civil defence. He had instead paid the money to the charity 'War on Want'. He declared ..... It is tragic that ordinary decent people are passively accepting this drift towards mass annihilation........ this is my small effort to make it clear that it is a heinous and devilish thing." Gloucester Citizen, 5 January 1962. While in prison on this occasion Laurie produced a leaflet "Why I am in Jail" for local distribution. His eldest daughter, Susan (aged 14), wrote to him in prison to tell him she stood in Stroud bus station for two hours giving out the leaflets.

=== Stroud protester answered ===
Mr Harold Macmillan, the Prime Minister has replied to a protest made by Mr Laurence Hislam of Stroud against American nuclear tests. Mr Hislam, the Stroud CND member, who recently fasted for 99 hours, had sent the protest, with a petition signed by 1,000 people of Stroud, both to the Prime Minister and President Kennedy against the tests. The reply quotes an extract from The Times "In particular the President and the Prime Minister ..... reaffirmed their regret that the Soviet Government had not been willing to join in an effective treaty which would end testing..." Mr Hislam commented "In my view, the responsibility for our policy - based as it is on a threat to annihilate mankind - cannot be passed on to the Russians." (Gloucester Citizen, 9 May 1962)

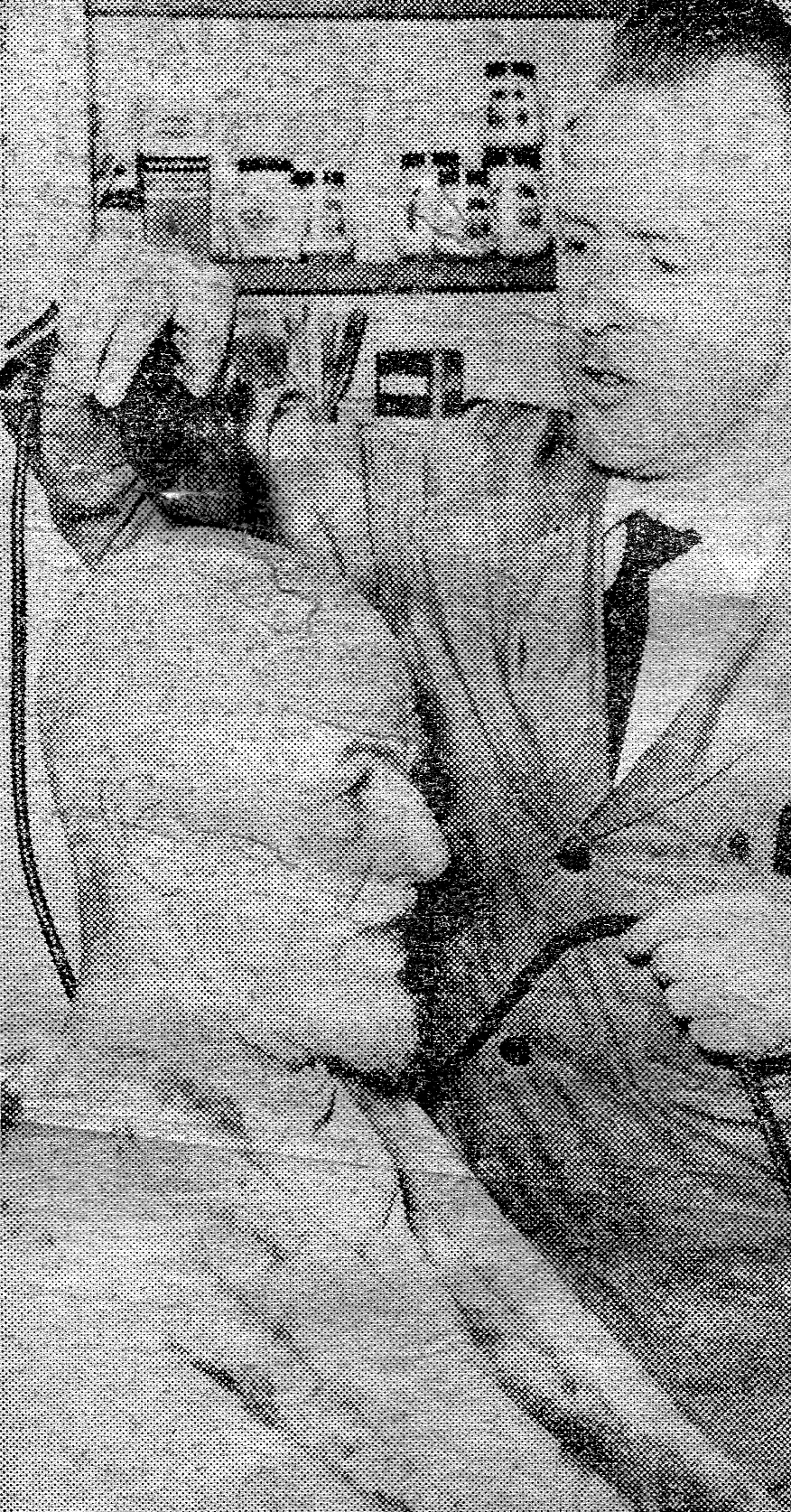
Laurie has head shaved

=== Local demonstrators expelled by E. Berlin police ===
Five "ban the bomb" demonstrators were yesterday expelled by Communist secret police after they had distributed leaflets in East Berlin. At her Brownshill, Stroud home Mrs Laurence Hislam, wife of one of the demonstrators told reporters that she had not heard of her husband's success in penetrating East Berlin "but they were expecting to get over the border and I thought they would creep in somehow" Gloucester Citizen, 15 April 1963

=== Ban-bomb man goes bald as Hiroshima protest ===
Nuclear disarmament campaigner Laurence Hislam (54) had his head shaved bald today - the anniversary of the dropping of the atomic bomb on Hiroshima. He said "I have done this as an unavoidable reminder to other people that they implicitly or explicitly accept the possibility of the use of the hydrogen bomb" He is keeping his beard and moustache "If I had them off too there would be the danger of my friends not recognising me in the street" His wife and five children he said had "come to accept pretty well anything I do". After the shearing Mr Hislam went to Stroud Roman Catholic Church for meditation before walking the 5 miles home to Brownshill. Stroud News and Journal, 6 August 1963

=== Mr. Hislam has the Yul Brynner ===
"To mark the guilt of Hiroshima Mr Hislam a ban-the-bomb campaigner had his head shaved to remind people of the horrors of the bomb. Yesterday, he and members of Stroud CND staged a fast to mark the anniversary." Gloucester Citizen 7 August 1964

== Walk to Rome ==
In autumn 1962, Hislam made plans for a pilgrimage to Rome. He had high hopes for the Second Vatican Council which was due to open in October, as Pope John XXIII was known as a man of peace. He began the 1,200 mile walk from his home in Gloucestershire and was joined in London by a younger companion, Neil Snelders. Before they left London an interview by ITV was broadcast on the 6 pm news. They had very little money, although some support from PAX, relying on the charity of the church (not always forthcoming) for accommodation along the route. Hislam wore a placard (re-made in French and then Italian along the way) setting out their purpose and there were many instances of interest and generosity from members of the public as well as occasional hostility. Laurie wrote regular reports for Peace News and kept a diary, completed each evening. The first entry states his purpose:

"Pilgrimage from Stroud to Rome, via London with the intention of seeking a Private Audience with Pope John XXlll asking him whether he does not think the time has come when the scandal of Catholics and other Christians (not to mention others not adhering to Christianity) preparing for nuclear war, and supporting policies based upon the readiness to prosecute such a war, should be condemned, and all individual Christians be instructed that by so doing they are acting contrary to the teaching of Christ."

He left home 1 October and reached Rome on 1 December. There followed much frustration with Vatican bureaucrats as the Pope was not in good health. He remained in Rome until 23 December and despite many meetings with Archbishop Roberts and others he was not able to arrange a Private Audience. He put what he wanted to say in a letter, accompanied by a petition from PAX, and was assured that this had been "sent to the Pope". He hoped for a reply, which did not happen, and he was not fully convinced that his letter had actually reached Pope John. A note in his diary towards the end of his time in Rome encapsulates his feelings of frustration and his own very personal commitment: "It is impossible it seems to convey to anyone the fact that one is really serious in one's intentions. It is difficult for anyone to grasp the idea that one might actually sacrifice something to achieve a step towards peace.

On 11 April 1963 Pope John XXIII issued his final papal encyclical Pacem in Terris (Peace on Earth), on nuclear non-proliferation but not the full condemnation of nuclear weapons that Laurie had hoped for.

== Untimely death ==
Laurie Hislam was killed on 26 August 1966 in a car crash in France while driving his family home from holiday in Yugoslavia. The death of the "Ban the bomb marcher" was reported in the Gloucester Citizen, Western Daily Press, Stroud News and Journal, Cheltenham Echo, Daily Sketch, Bristol Evening Post and also mentioned on the BBC News. An obituary by David Stayt, of Gloucester CND, appeared in the Stroud News and Journal, Peace News and Sanity (CND). A 'Personal Comment', written by John Papworth for Peace News September 1966 gives his thoughts on Hislam's character: "Laurie was always ready to pursue an argument as far a it would go … his talk was dominated by his concern for peace …. many highly individual attempts to jolt people into a flicker of awareness of the war peril."
