= St Bernard's Priory =

St Bernard's Priory may refer to:

- St Bernard's Priory, 1786 novel by Martha Harley
- St Bernard's Priory, Kipalapala, priory in Tanzania
- Hyning Priory, Warton, Lancashire, England, previously known as St Bernard's Priory
