= Douglas Strachan =

Scottish stained glass artist (1875–1950)

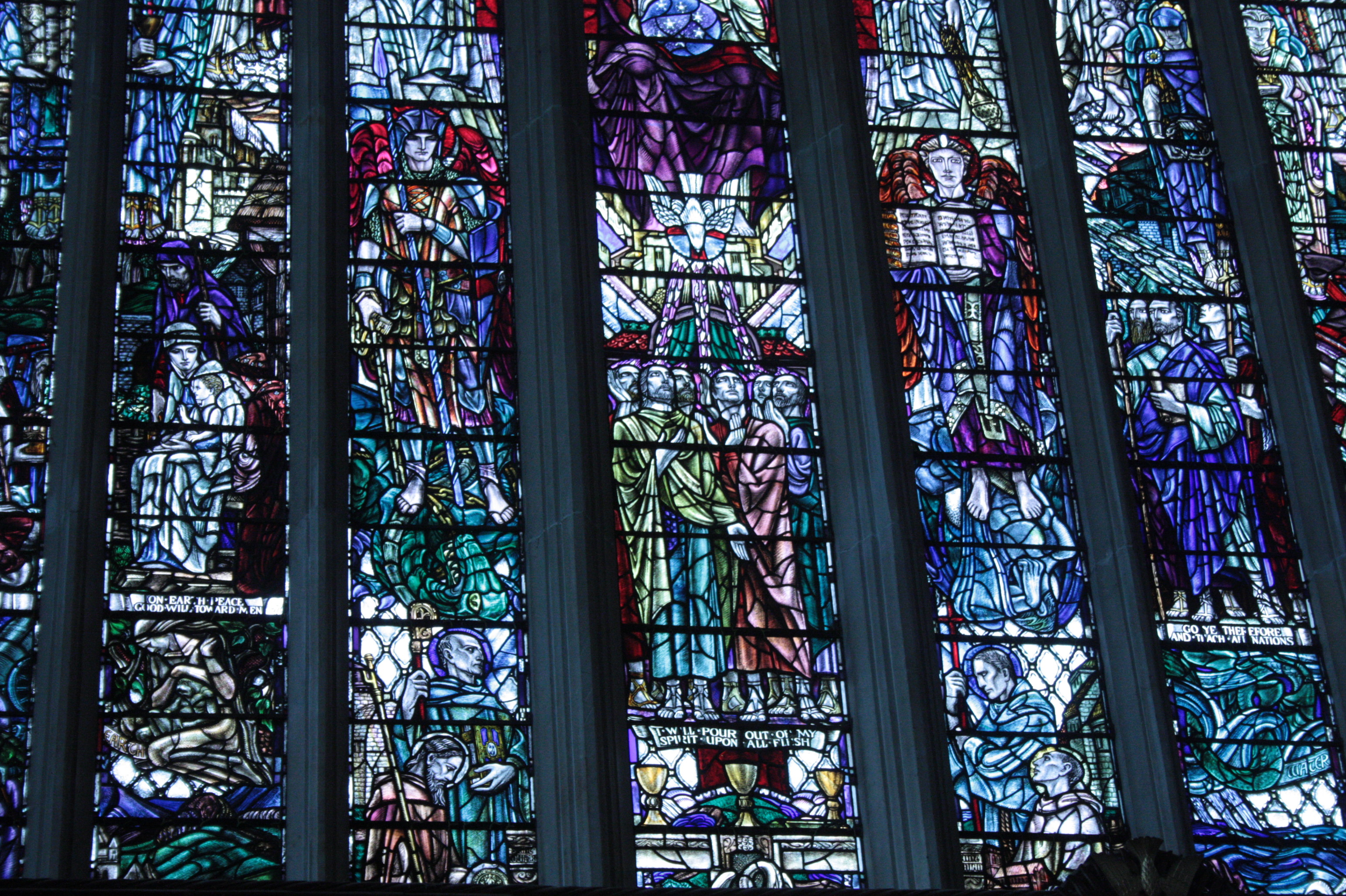
- The east window of Paisley Abbey, by Strachan
- Born: Robert Douglas Strachan; 26 May 1875; Aberdeen, Scotland
- Died: 20 November 1950 (aged 75); Lasswade, Midlothian
- Education: Gray's School of Art; Royal Scottish Academy
- Known for: Stained glass, painting, murals
- Notable work: Scottish National War Memorial windows, Peace Palace windows
- Movement: Arts and Crafts Movement
- Spouse: Elsie Isabel Cromar

Douglas Strachan Hon. RSA (26 May 1875, Aberdeen, Scotland – 20 November 1950) is considered the most significant Scottish designer of stained glass windows in the 20th century. He is best known for his windows at the Peace Palace in The Hague, Netherlands, at Edinburgh's Scottish National War Memorial and in cathedrals and churches throughout the United Kingdom. He is also known for his paintings, murals, and illustrations.

== Early life and education ==
Strachan was born in Aberdeen in 1875. He studied art at Gray's School of Art in Aberdeen from 1893 to 1894 while he worked as an apprentice to the Aberdeen Free Press as a lithographer. He later studied art at the Life School of the Royal Scottish Academy in Edinburgh from 1894 to 1895.

== Career ==
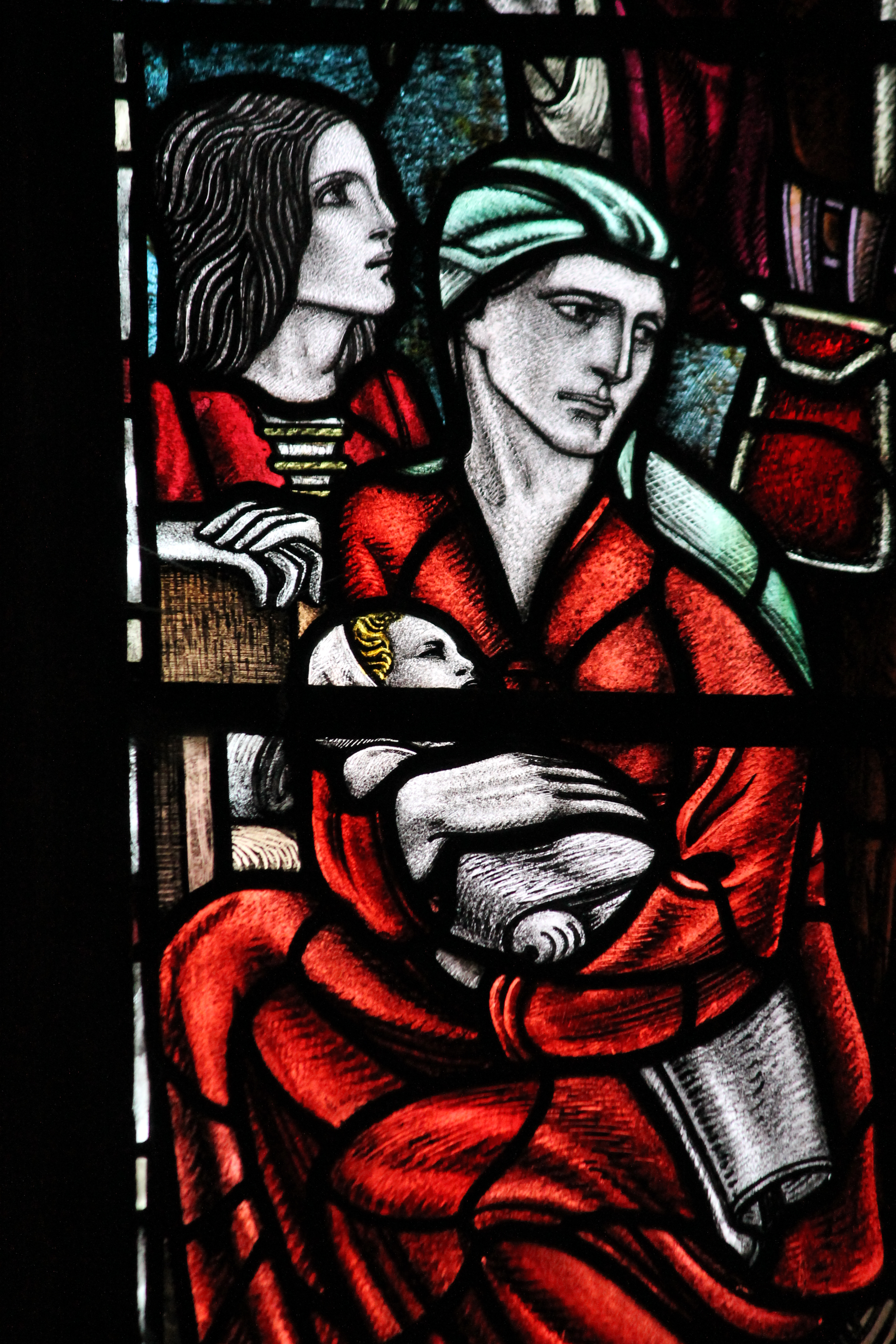
Detail of Winchelsea window, 1931–1933

From 1895 to 1897, Strachan worked in Manchester as a black and white artist on several newspapers, and as a political cartoonist for the Manchester Evening Chronicle. Strachan learned to work in stained glass in 1898–1899, while in Manchester, probably studying with Walter Williams, of the firm Williams Brothers & Co., Chester, Manchester and London. Strachan returned to Aberdeen after 1897 and worked as a mural and portrait painter.

In 1899, Strachan travelled to France and Italy. He studied the art of medieval and renaissance Italy, as well as contemporary French painters. In a memoir written by Strachan's daughter, she stated that Strachan had been "enthralled by the medieval windows of Chartres—inspired above all by their luminous monumentality rather than specific details of style and technique." Strachan's European tour had a major impact on his future work as a stained-glass artist.

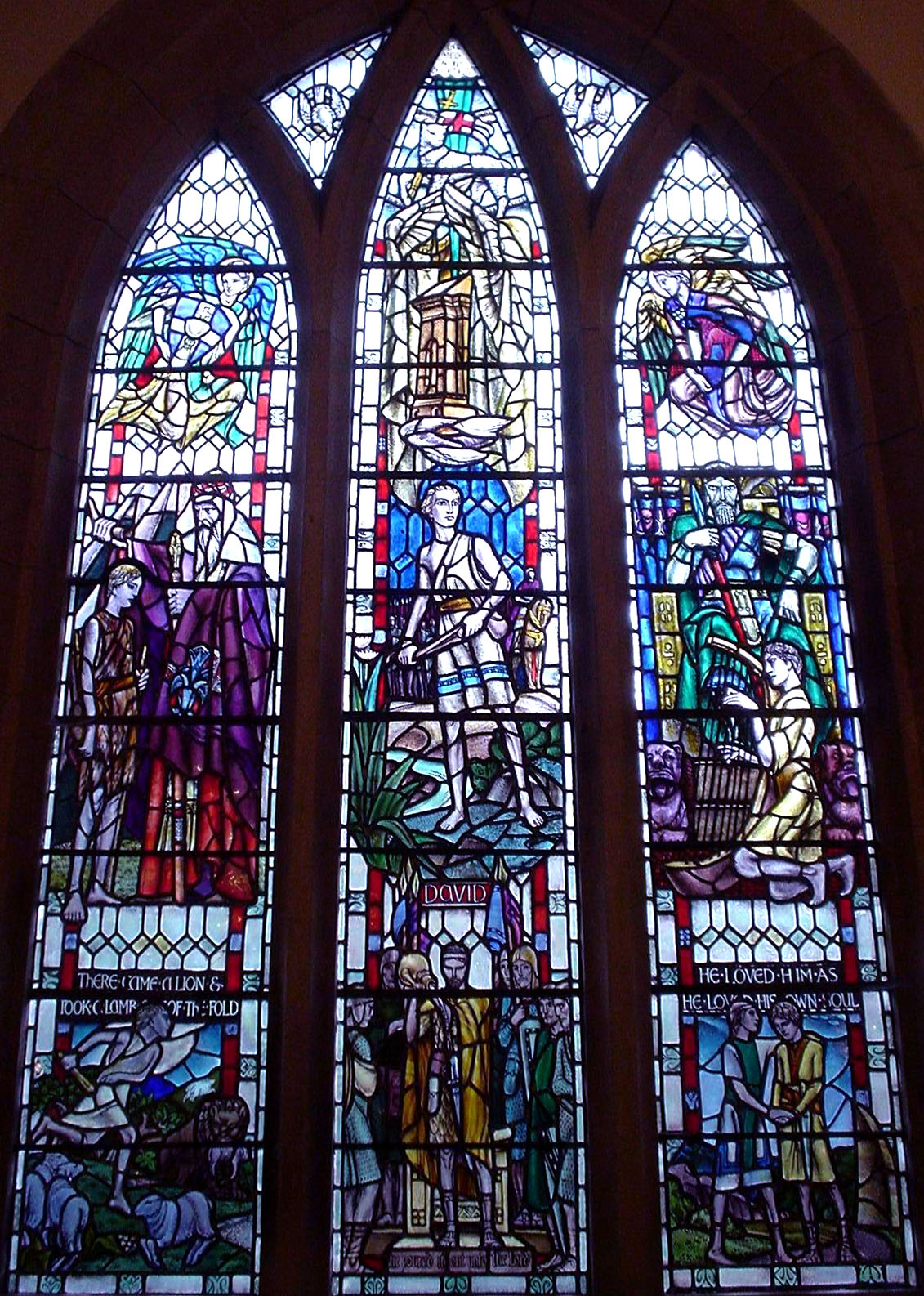
East window at Humbie Parish Church, East Lothian, 1949

The two windows Strachan completed in 1900 after his return from Europe, show the influence of the art he studied on his tour and also his growing interest in stained glass of the Arts and Crafts movement. Jesus Blessing Children (1900), South Church, St Mark's, Aberdeen and Christ in Glory and Evangelists (901), St James Episcopal Church, Aberdeen, both represent the imagery and jewel like tones of contemporary Arts and Crafts windows.

By 1909, Strachan had produced a number of stained glass works. He was hired as the head of the Crafts Section of the Edinburgh College of Art. He supervised the Applied Art department of the College, which included classes in stained glass. Strachan, and his brother Alexander, who was hired as the technical instructor of stained glass, opened a stained-glass studio-workshop in Edinburgh. The added stress of working on his own stained glass commissions while teaching and acting as department head led Strachan to resign his position at the school in 1911. From 1911 until he retired in the 1940s, Strachan worked primarily on stained glass commissions.

Around 1928 he bought Pittendreich House, just outside Lasswade, a few miles south of Edinburgh. The house was designed by David Bryce in 1857 for Sir George Deas.

By 1929, Strachan had won international acclaim for his work, including his four windows of 1911-13 at the Peace Palace in The Hague, Netherlands. He also added to his international reputation as an influential stained glass artist for his war memorial windows for the Scottish National War Memorial at Edinburgh Castle.

== Legacy ==
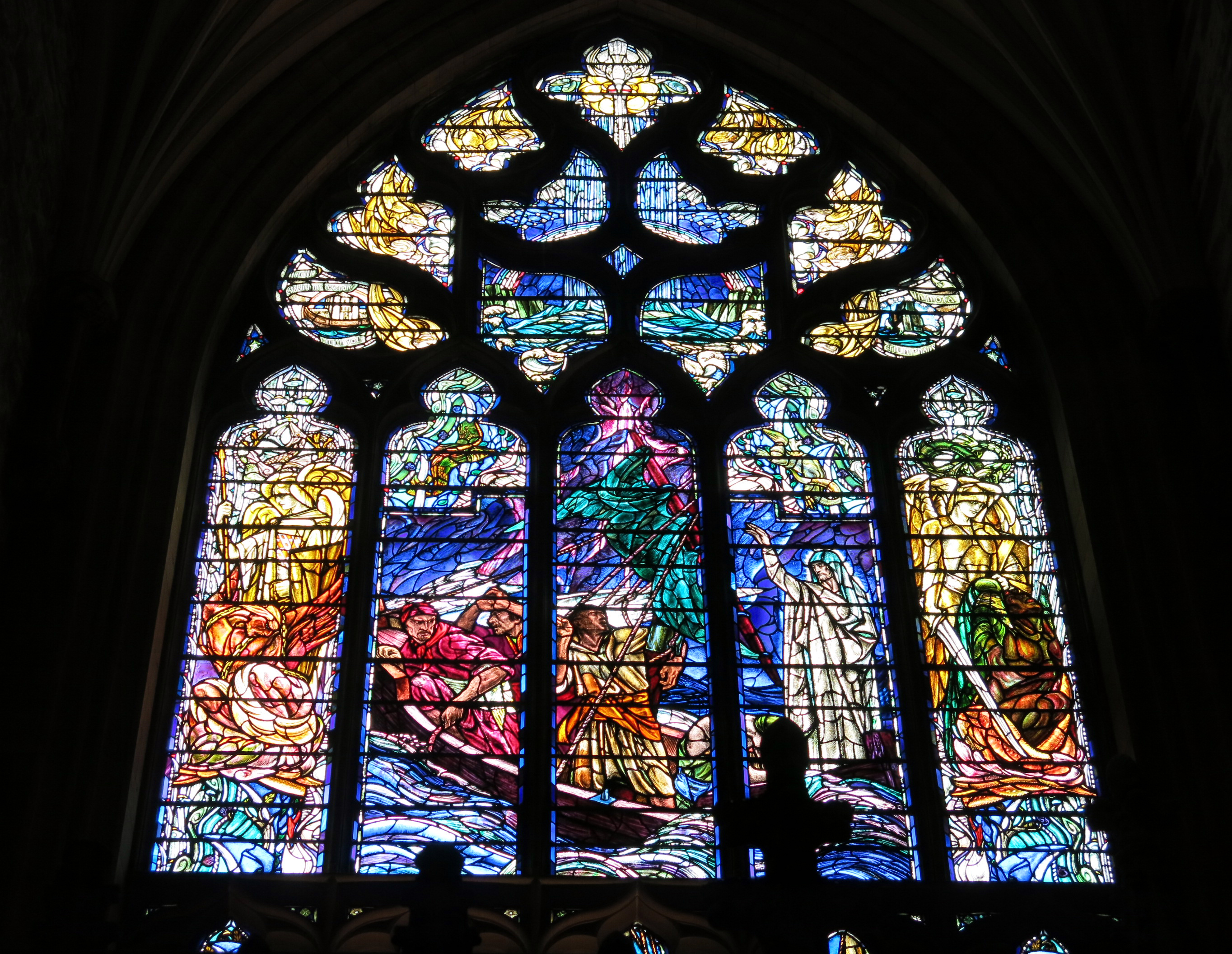
Christ Walking on the Water, St Giles Cathedral

In the Journal of Stained Glass, stained glass historian and author Peter Cormack proposed that "there is probably no British stained glass artist who could match Strachan's ability to draw with lead". Strachan, a contemporary of Harry Clarke (1889–1931) in Ireland and Christopher Whall in England, is seen as one of the three most important stained glass artists working in Great Britain and Ireland at the end of the nineteenth century and the early twentieth century.

== Private life ==
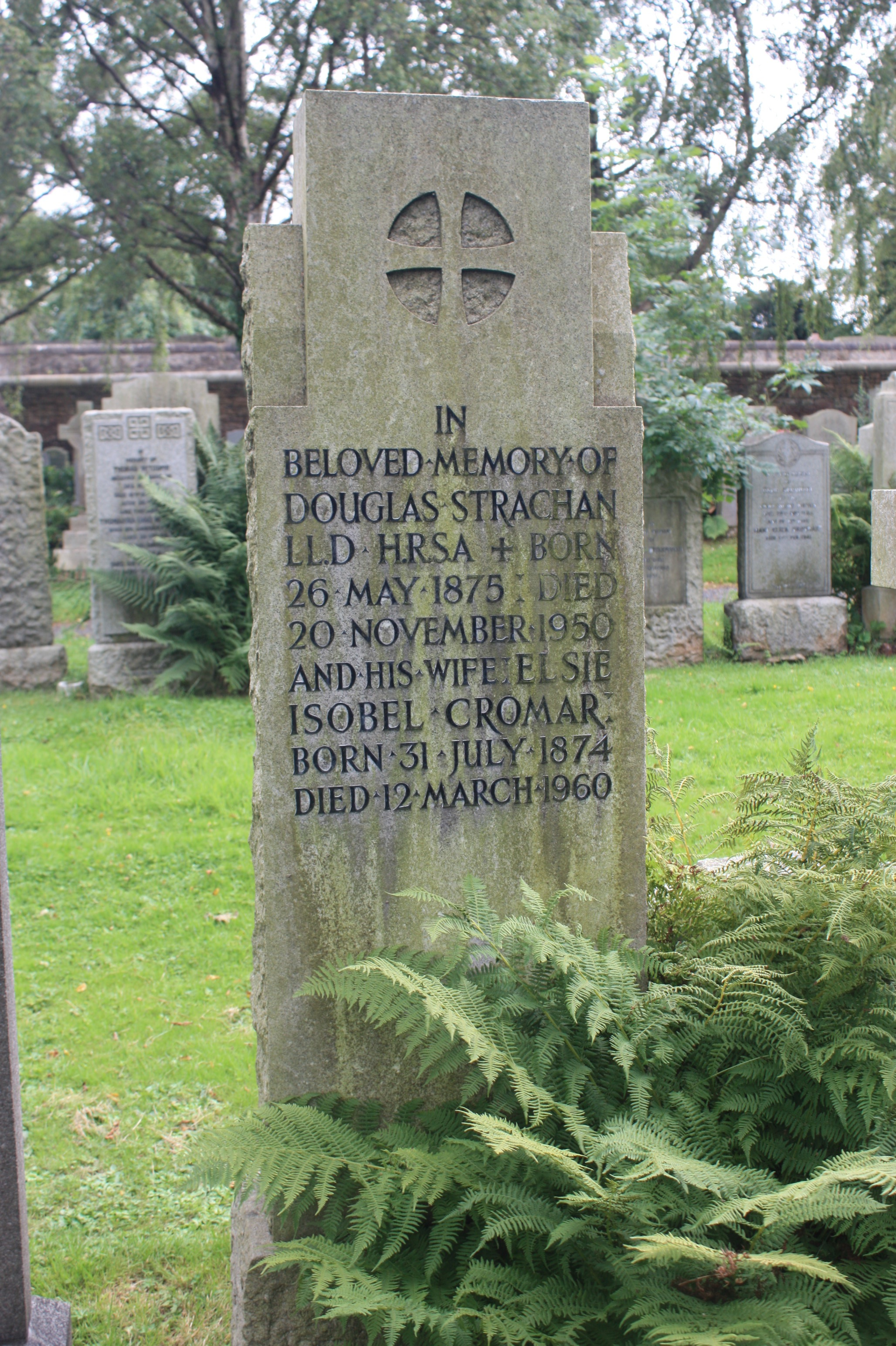
Grave of Douglas Strachan, Dean Cemetery

Strachan died in Pittendreich House in Lasswade, Midlothian, and is buried in the central section of the 20th century extension to Dean Cemetery in Edinburgh.

== Works ==
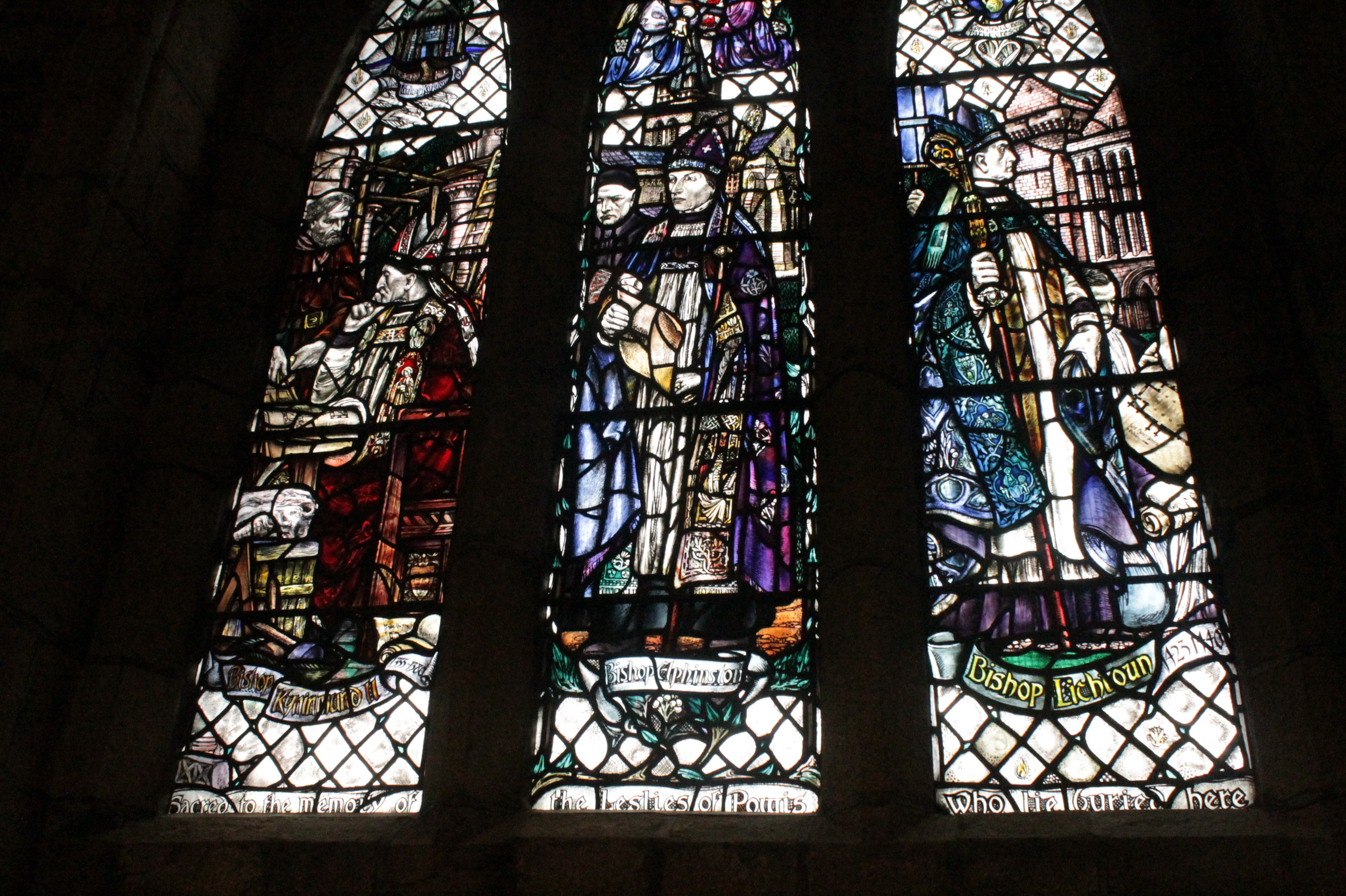
The Builder Bishops window by Douglas Strachan, St Machar's Cathedral

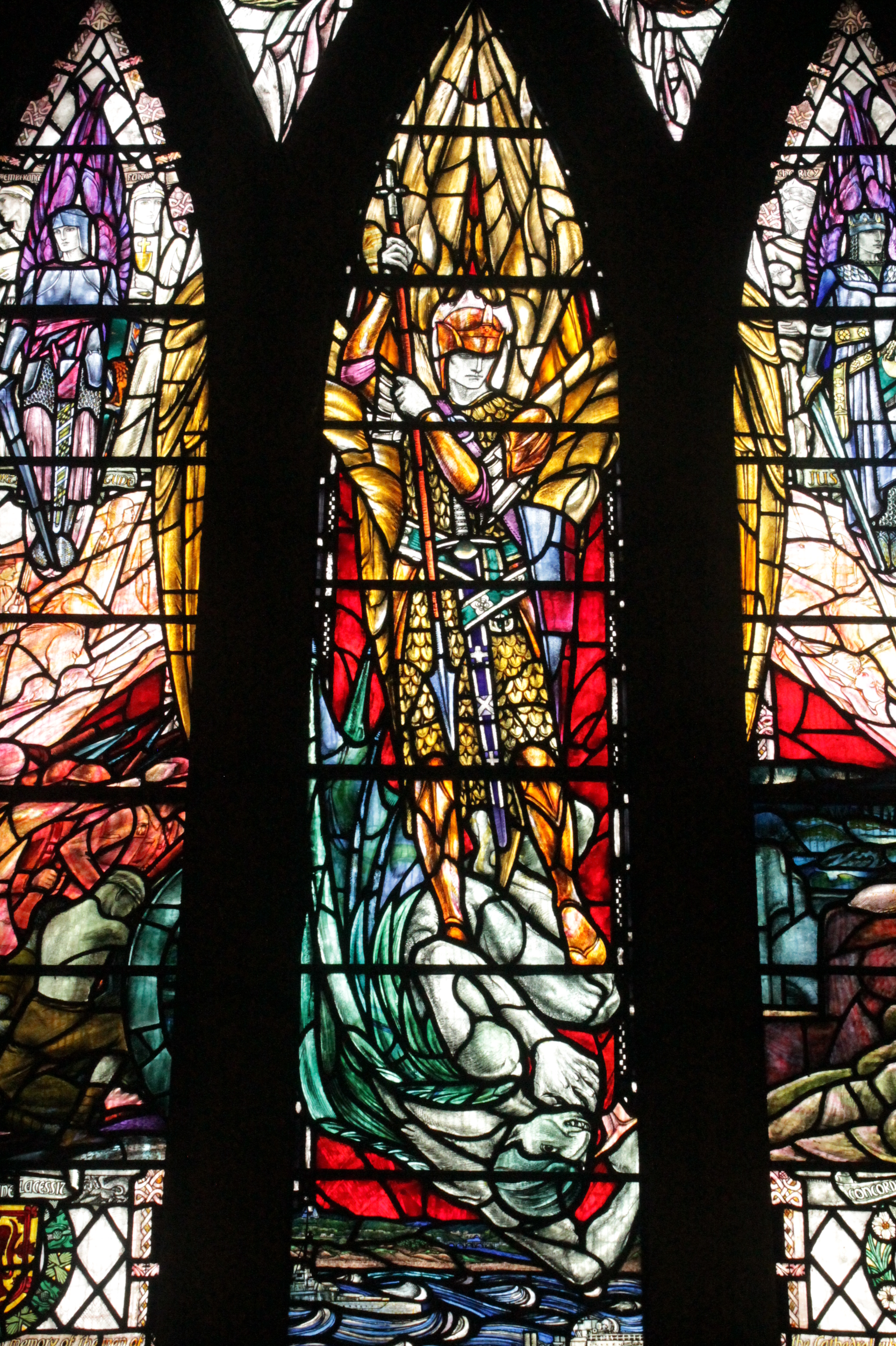
War memorial window (St Michael) St Machar's Cathedral by Douglas Strachan

Although Strachan was interested in Futurism, Cubism and Vorticism, his work shows little influence of this. Strachan often composed his windows in areas of pure colour which were then defined by areas of silvery white. His largest commission was to design the windows for the Scottish National War Memorial in Edinburgh Castle in the late 1920s.

Strachan's work can also be seen at:

- St Aidan's Church, Bamburgh, Northumberland
- St Andrew's United Reformed Church (incl. War Memorial Window – "Sacrifice"), Hampstead, London
- All Saints, Jesus Lane, Cambridge
- All Saints' Church, St Andrews
- The Peace Palace at The Hague, Netherlands
- Humbie Parish Church, East Lothian
- Baptistery windows at St James, Goldenacre, Edinburgh.
- King's College Chapel, Aberdeen
- St Machar's Cathedral, Aberdeen
- New Machar Parish Church, Newmachar, Aberdeenshire
- St Lawrence's Church, East Rounton, North Yorkshire (memorial window to Gertrude Bell
- Fraserburgh Old Parish Church (1906)
- East window (St Andrew) in the Thistle Chapel, St Giles Cathedral (1909–11)
- St Magnus Cathedral, Kirkwall, Orkney (1912)
- Nairn Old Parish Church, Nairn
- "David being anointed by Samuel", Dirleton Kirk (1916)
- St Margaret's Chapel, Edinburgh Castle (1922)
- Bedrule Church (1922)
- "Christ Walking on the Water", St Giles Cathedral (1922)
- St Giles Cathedral, saint windows (1932–35)
- Westminster College, Cambridge
- Bothwell Parish Church, South Lanarkshire, Gilchrist Window, for Marion Gilchrist
- St Margaret's Church, West Hoathly, Sussex
- St Thomas' Church, Winchelsea, East Sussex
- St Michael and All Angels, Waterford, Hertfordshire
- Paisley Abbey main east window (his largest work)
- St John's Kirk, Perth, Scotland
- University of Glasgow Chapel
- Finnart St Paul's Church Greenock, Scotland PA16 7UR
- University of Glasgow Bute Hall
- Kilbrandon and Kilchattan Kirk, Argyll
- St Mary of the Angels, Brownshill, Gloucestershire.
- St Andrew's Episcopal Church, Kelso, Scottish Borders
- St Oswald's Church, Hotham, East Yorkshire (which contains 6 windows by Strachan)
- All Saints Church, North Cave, East Yorkshire
- The Katherine Graham Memorial Chapel situated at Dr. Graham's Homes in Kalimpong, West Bengal, India. Contains six windows by the artist.
- St Mary, Kemsing, Kent
- Memorial window to John Cruickshank in Victoria and Albert Museum, Dundee (formerly in Marischal College, Aberdeen
- Struthers Memorial Church (formerly Westbourne Free Church), Glasgow.
