= Bernardine Cistercians of Esquermes =

Small branch of the Cistercians

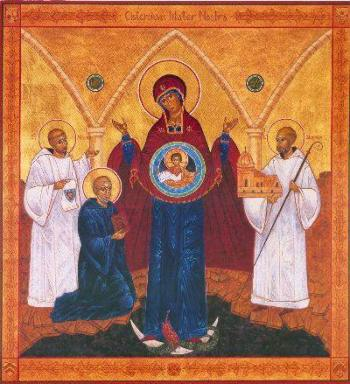
- Robert, Alberic and Stephen Harding, founders of Citeaux
- Formation: c. AD 1098; 928 years ago
- Founder: Robert, Alberic and Stephen Harding
- Type: Catholic religious order
- Headquarters: France
- Website: http://www.cisterciennes-bernardines.org/

The Bernardine Cistercians of Esquermes are a small branch of the Cistercian Order. They follow the Rule of St Benedict, and co-operate with the apostolic mission of the Catholic Church through educational activities and hospitality. There are eight monasteries of nuns in six countries, united by a central government.

== History ==
=== The Cistercian Order ===
In the 11th century, three Benedictine monks, Robert of Molesme, Alberic and Stephen Harding, sought to follow the Rule of St. Benedict in all its fulness. Along with a group of other monks who shared this vision of simplicity, austerity and fraternal life, they went to Cîteaux in Burgundy, where the "New Monastery" was established in March 1098. They became known as Cistercians.

The new monastery struggled at first, but in 1112, Bernard of Clairvaux arrived with 30 of his male relatives and friends. Their arrival was to give Citeaux new life and energy. Soon the monastery grew so much that new foundations were made, including Clairvaux in 1115, of which Bernard was to be the abbot. Although Bernard was not one of the founders, he was to play a key role in the development of the new order. By the time of his death in 1153, there were 353 monasteries of the order throughout Europe.

Many women wished to follow the Cistercian ideal and many houses were established including several in French Flanders.

=== The French Revolution and the Bernardines of Esquermes ===
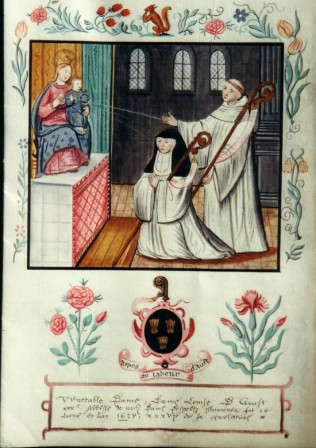
Manuscript from Notre Dame des Pres, Douai, showing St Bernard and a nun

The Abbeys of Notre Dame de la Brayelle at Annay (1196), Notre Dame de la Woestine at St. Omer (1217), and Notre Dame Des Près in Douai (1221) were three Cistercian houses for women in Flanders. In common with many monasteries in the area, the sisters were known as Bernardines. Following the French Revolution in 1789, the three abbeys were suppressed in 1792. Their goods were confiscated and the members dispersed. However this was not to be the end of the Cistercian ideal for three determined sisters.

Dame Hippolyte Lecouvreur (1747–1828) from Les Près, together with her blood sister Dame Hombeline Lecouvreur (1750–1829) from Annay and Dame Hyacinthe Dewismes (1760–1840) from La Woestine met together in 1799 with the sole aim of re-establishing their Cistercian life. They settled in the small village of Esquermes, a suburb of Lille. Here they were able to begin to live their monastic life again. As a way of earning a living and to show their utility in a régime that was still hostile to religious, the sisters opened a school. Before the Revolution, two of the Abbeys had had small schools for the education of young girls, so this work was in direct continuity with their origins. Educational activities remain part of the charism of the Bernardines to this day. In 1806, building work began on the new monastery.

It took 30 long years to reestablish their official statutes and interior rule which drew heavily on their Cistercian customs. The official erection of the Monastery of Notre Dame de la Plaine took place on May 28, 1827. By this time they had been joined by several other women, including two nuns from their former abbeys.

=== The first hundred years ===
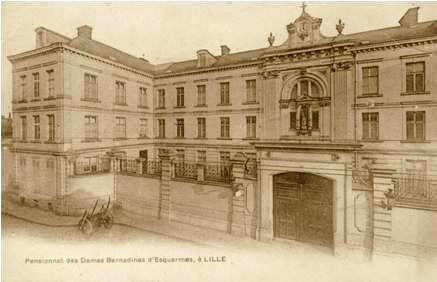
Esquermes in the 19th Century

The sisters were joined by many young women who shared in their ideals and the "new" monastery grew. A young chaplain who exercised disproportionate power in the life of the community imposed his own rule of life on the community, preventing them from following some of their Cistercian usages but the sisters clung to their customs and lived their Cistercian Rule in secret. In 1846, at the invitation of the Archbishop of Cambrai, they established a monastery and school in that town. During this time, the schools and monasteries at Esquermes and Cambrai prospered, and had a considerable influence in the area. However anticlericalism persisted in France, and the sisters foresaw the possibility of further difficulties with the authorities. This led them to found refuge communities, first in Belgium (Ollignies, 1883), and then in Slough in England (1897), Bonsecours in France (1904).

The original intention at Esquermes had never been to establish a congregation, but the founding of new monasteries required new structures and new Constitutions, which were approved by Rome in 1909. In 1904, following anticlerical laws, the sisters were expelled from Esquermes and took refuge in the other houses of the order. Ollignies in Belgium became the mother house.

=== Later developments ===
The new code of Canon Law of 1917 opened the door for the Bernardines to rediscover their Cistercian identity. New constitutions were approved in 1937, which recognized the Bernardines as Cistercians.

In 1955, official approval from Rome enabled the sisters to take solemn vows as Cistercian nuns.

Spiritual links with both the Cistercians of the Strict Observance and the Common Observance were firmly established.

Following the call of Pope Pius XII, monasteries were founded in Hamamatsu, Japan (1954) and Goma, Congo (1960). The Bernardines were able to return to France and the mother house was transferred to the Monastery of Notre Dame de La Plaine, St André-lez-Lille (1948).

== Spirituality ==
=== Cistercian spirituality and vows ===
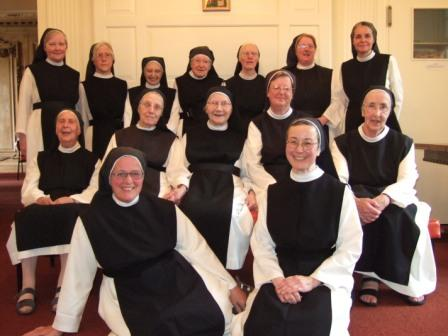
Hyning Community

Bernardine Cistercians follow Christ according to the Gospel, guided by the Rule of St Benedict. Written in the sixth century, the rule sets out a way of seeking God in community, through a life of prayer and service of others. The Opus Dei or Divine Office is central to the day. Cistercians seek God together, having all things in common, living in simplicity, in relative silence and solitude. Hospitality is a key Benedictine value; those who arrive at the monastery to share in the prayer and peace are never turned away.

The writings of the Cistercian Fathers and Mothers, particularly those of the 12th and 13th century including Bernard and Aelred transmit the values of the founding Cistercians and continue to be a source of spiritual riches for the Bernardines today.

Bernardines Cistercians make the three traditional Benedictine vows:

- Stability, a commitment to live where God calls, rooted in the Gospel;
- Obedience: accepting to listen to the voice of God and others and to be under the authority of a Prioress, and mutual obedience to the others in the community; and
- Conversion of Life, the turning of one's whole life to God, striving to become more Christ-like. Included in this are consecrated chastity and poverty.

The Blessed Virgin Mary, the mother of Jesus, has an important role in the spirituality of the order. Contemplation of the Virgin Mary in the light of scripture leads to contemplation of the mysteries of Christ. All Bernardine monasteries are dedicated to Our Lady.

=== Prayer ===
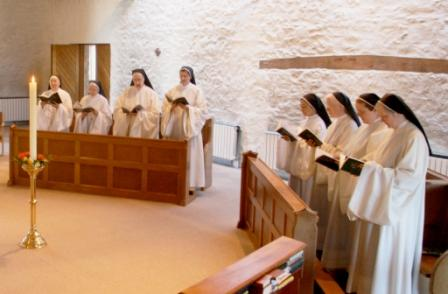
The Divine Office at the Monastery of Our Lady of Hyning

Liturgical and personal prayer is at the heart of the life of the Bernardine Cistercians. The sisters meet five times daily for the offices of Lauds (morning prayer) Terce (at about 9 a.m) Midday Prayer, Vespers (Evening prayer) and Vigils before retiring. The last office of the day, Vigils, combines both the elements of traditional Vigils, (night watching in the hope of the coming day) and Compline (thanking God for the day that has passed and praying for a peaceful night.) The office of Vigils ends with the singing of the Salve Regina by candlelight.

Each morning, the sisters are united around the table of the Eucharist at Mass, which is the source and summit of the day.

Liturgical prayer is nourished by personal prayer. Lectio Divina, the prayerful and meditative reading of scripture, opens the sisters to the Word of God and allows it to act in their lives. Considerable time each day is allocated to Lectio Divina and other forms of personal prayer.

== Structures ==
=== Government ===
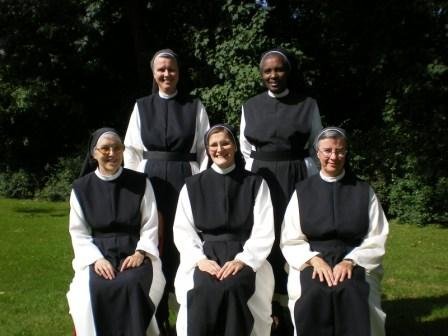
The General Council

The historical development of the Bernardine Order resulted in it having a central government, based at the mother house at the Monastery of Notre Dame de La Plaine, St André-lez-Lille. The prioress general is responsible for the overall administration of the order, aided by a general council of four other sisters, the secretary general and the bursar general. Together they look at important issues arising in the order.

Each community has a local prioress who is responsible for the day-to-day running of her own community; she is assisted by a local council.

A general chapter of the order takes place every six years at which the prioress general and her council are elected. The chapter consists of the prioresses of all communities, the general council, the secretary general and the bursar general and elected delegates of the monasteries. The chapter also debates important issues. It holds the supreme authority of the order; in between chapters, this authority is delegated to the prioress general and her council.

The monasteries are not autonomous, and sometimes sisters move between communities according to need.

=== Formation ===
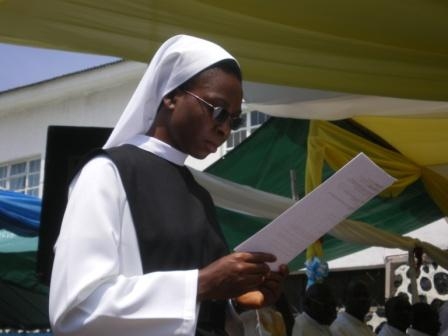
First Vows of a Sister

Formation of new candidates takes place in their own country. After a period of enquiring, a candidate can be admitted as a postulant. The postulancy lasts between six months and two years. She then becomes a novice, for a further eighteen months to two years. During these stages, the person is initiated into the life and traditions of the order and with the help of the novice mistress, seeks to discern if this is what God is calling her to.

The novice may then make a commitment as a vowed sister (profession) for a period of time between three and nine years. She is known as a junior professed.

At the end of the period of temporary profession, the junior professed then makes solemn profession, committing herself to follow God in the Bernardine Cistercian way of life until death.

== Current monasteries ==
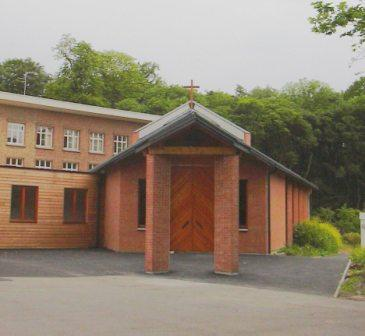
The Church at La Plaine, the Mother House

There are currently eight Bernardine monasteries:

- Monastery of Notre-Dame-de-la-Plaine (Mother House) Saint-André-lez-Lille, France
- Monastery of Notre-Dame-des-Petites-Roches, Saint-Bernard-du-Touvet, Isère, France
- Monastery of Stella Maris, Mikkabi, Japan
- Monastery Notre Dame du Lac, Goma, Democratic Republic of Congo
- Monastery of Our Lady of Hyning, Warton, near Carnforth, England
- Monastery of Our Lady of Bafor, Diébougou, Burkina Faso
- Monastery of Our Lady and St Bernard, Brownshill, Stroud, England

A prefoundation in Asia.

== Activities ==
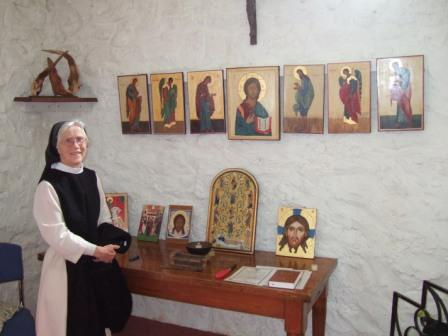
icon Studio

The search for God through a life of prayer is the first activity of all Bernardine monasteries, but each monastery also has a variety of activities.

The key Benedictine principles of education and hospitality remain at the heart of the charism of the order. Two monasteries have schools, and other monasteries maintain educational activities through leading retreats, catechesis, writing icons and initiating others in this art, spiritual accompaniment etc.

All Bernardine monasteries have guest houses where guests can share in the peace and prayer of the community and have a break from the business of everyday life.

Other activities, according to community, include raising animals, (cows, poultry, sheep), kitchen garden, making altar breads, secretarial work, monastic shops, and the usual work of administration and maintenance that is found in any community.

== Oblates and lay associates ==
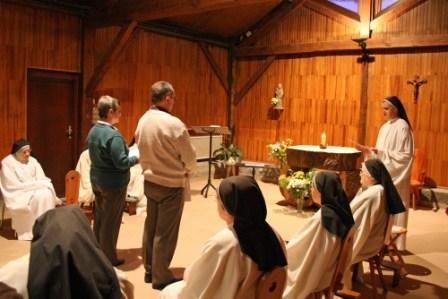
Two Bernardine Oblates make their commitment, Le Touvet

Lay people who wish to deepen their faith by drawing from the riches of Cistercian spirituality may become oblates of any Bernardine community. A temporary promise is made, followed by a life promise to live the Christian life inspired by the Rule of St Benedict. The practical living out of this commitment is adapted to the life and circumstances of each oblate, but in general they remain in close contact with one of the monasteries.

Groups of Lay Cistercians are also emerging in some countries.

== Sources and external links ==
- Official website (in English, French, and Japanese)
- Order of the Cistercians of the Strict Observance
- Order of Cistercians
- Cistopedia
- Cistercian Family (Lay Associates)
