= Chalford =

Village in Gloucestershire, England

Coordinates: 51°43′26″N 2°08′57″W

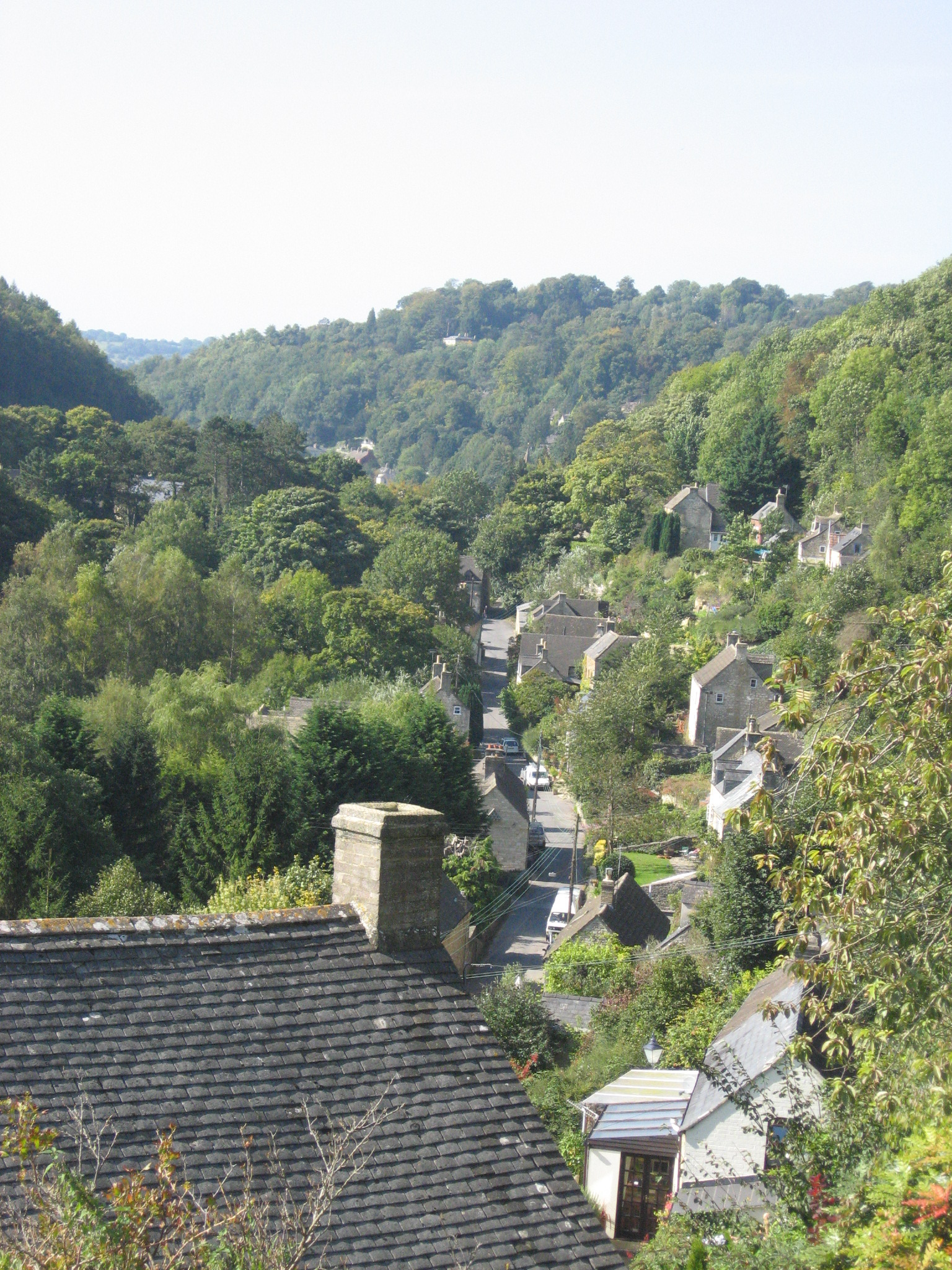
- Frome valley showing Chalford High Street

- Location within Gloucestershire
- Population: 6,215 (parish, 2011 census)
- OS grid reference: SO898028
- Civil parish: Chalford
- District: Stroud
- Shire county: Gloucestershire
- Region: South West
- Country: England
- Sovereign state: United Kingdom
- Post town: Stroud
- Postcode district: GL6
- Dialling code: 01453
- Police: Gloucestershire
- Fire: Gloucestershire
- Ambulance: South Western
- UK Parliament: Stroud

Chalford is a large village in the Frome Valley of the Cotswolds in Gloucestershire, England. It is to the southeast of Stroud about four miles (six kilometres) upstream. It gives its name to Chalford parish, which covers the villages of Chalford, Chalford Hill, France Lynch, Bussage and Brownshill, spread over two square miles (five square kilometres) of the Cotswold countryside. At this point the valley is also called the Golden Valley.

== Governance ==
An electoral ward in the same name exists. This ward covers a similar area to the parish but extends to the Brimscombe and Thrupp ward. The total population of the ward taken at the 2011 census was 6,509.

== History ==
The remains, and known sites of many barrows indicate that the plateau area of Chalford Hill, France Lynch and Bussage has been an area of continuous settlement for probably at least 4,000 years. Stone Age flints have been found in the area as well as the remains of a Roman Villa. Several of the place names in the area are also Anglo-Saxon in origin.

The name Chalford may be derived from Calf ('Way') Ford, or possibly from the Old English cealj, or 'Chalk', and Ford (river crossing point). There were two ancient crossings at Chalford apart from the ford from which the village was named: Stoneford, recorded from the later 12th century, was the crossing-point of a track up Cowcombe hill on the line of the later Cirencester turnpike and by 1413 another track crossed into Minchinhampton by Stephen's bridge at Valley Corner.

Chalford Hill is a recent title for the western end of the hill: Its original name was Chalford Lynch. "Lynch" (lynchet in modern English) (Note: Both forms derive from the Anglo-Saxon hlinc.) means a cultivated terrace following the contours of a hill. Chalford Lynch and its extension France Lynch originated in the late 16th century as collections of stone cottages many built illegally on the peripheries of Bisley common as the mill expansion in the valley outstripped accommodation space in the valley. Many dwellings in France Lynch and Chalford Hill only became legitimate at the time of the parliamentary enclosures in 1869.

The settling of displaced Flemish Huguenot weavers in the 17th and 18th centuries brought quality silk and woollen cloth manufacturing to the valley. Some say that they gave their name to the neighbouring village of France Lynch. It is more likely that the name comes from a non-conformist chapel, France Meeting that was displaced from the village in the valley to the Lynches above. At this point the Golden Valley is narrow and deep so many weavers' cottages were built clinging to the sides of the hills, giving the village an Alpine air. It is sometimes still referred to as the 'Alpine village'. As the paths on the hillsides were too narrow for more conventional forms of transport donkeys were used to carry groceries and other goods to houses, this tradition continuing until as recently as the 1950s.

Chalford expanded rapidly with the opening of the Thames and Severn Canal in 1789 and the village became one of the centres for the manufacture of broadcloth. Its wealthy clothiers lived close to their mills and built many fine houses which survive to this day.

== Architecture ==
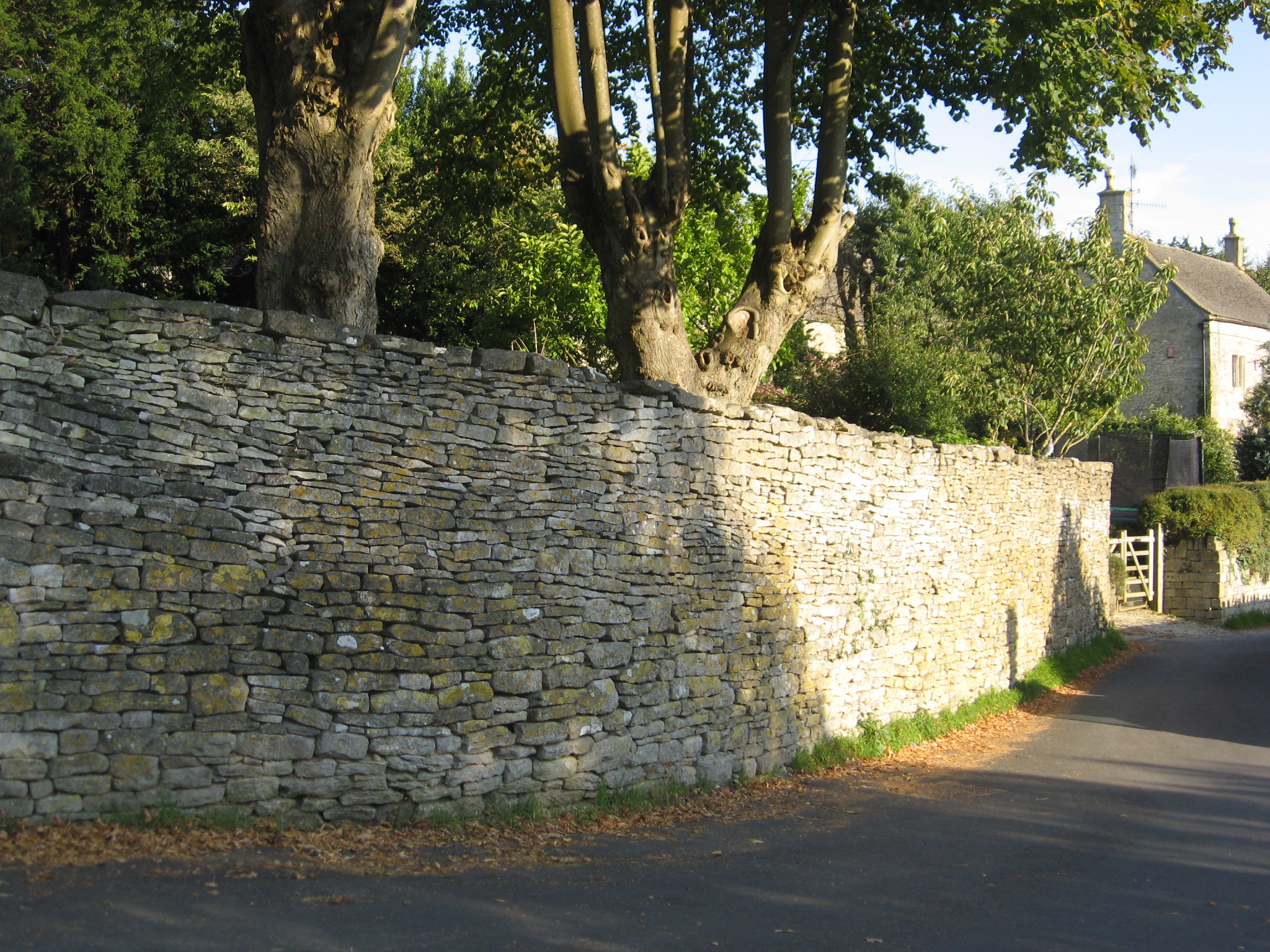
Dry stone wall in Chalford Hill

In common with other towns and villages in the area, buildings are generally constructed of Cotswold stone, with local fields enclosed by dry stone walling. The area is designated as an Area of Outstanding Natural Beauty and the village itself is a designated conservation area.

Chalford has two Arts and Crafts movement churches. Christ Church (Church of England) contains work by Norman Jewson, William Simmonds, Peter Waals, Edward Barnsley, Norman Bucknell, amongst other distinguished artists and craftsmen working in the Cotswold tradition. The Church of Our Lady of the Angels (Roman Catholic), Brownshill, by W. D. Caroe (1930), contains stained glass by Douglas Strachan. France Lynch, part of the civil parish but a separate ecclesiastical parish has a listed church, St John the Baptist, built by George Frederick Bodley who went on to build Washington National Cathedral in Washington DC.

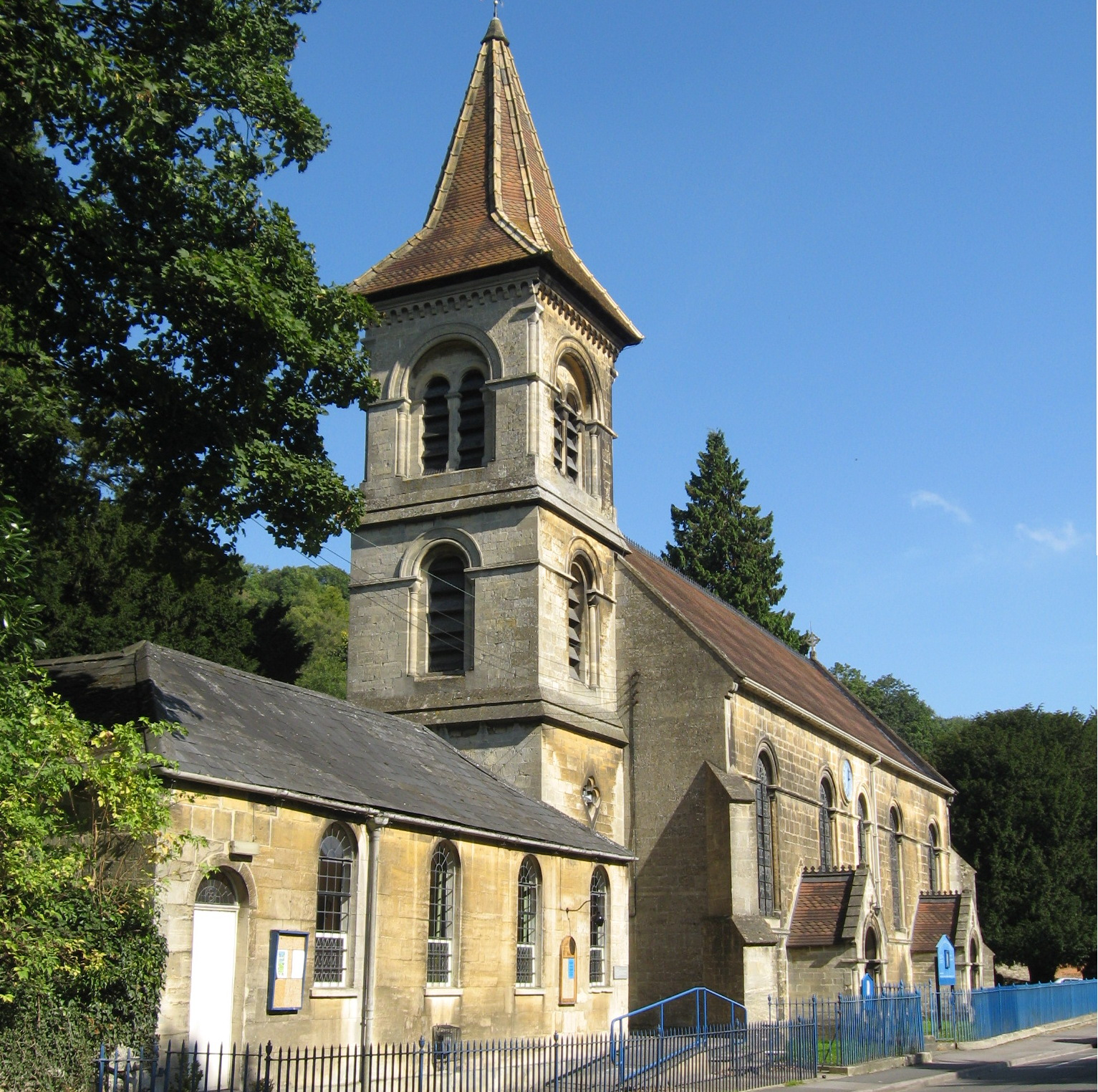
Christ Church, Chalford

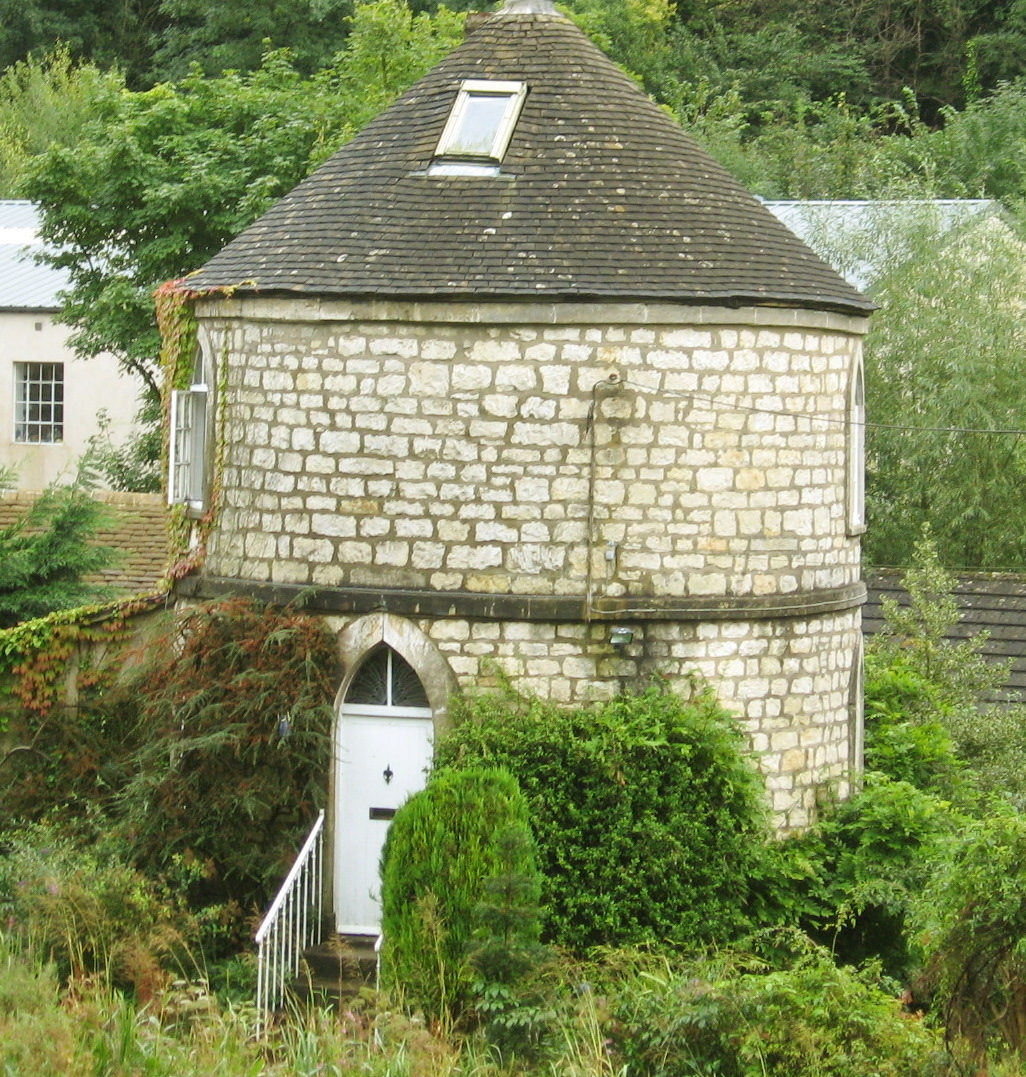
Round house at Chalford

The Round House was built by the Thames and Severn Canal Company as a lengthman's cottage and is one of five along the Thames and Severn Canal. (The others are at Coates, Cerney Wick, Marston Meysey and Inglesham.) Access is by way of steps up to the first floor as the ground floor would have originally been stabling for a horse. Apart from a relatively short break in the 1950s when it was a museum it has fulfilled its function as a private residence, which it continues to do to this day.

Directly opposite the Round House is Chalford Place, a Grade II* listed building built on the site of the original home of the de Chalkfordes who are mentioned in documents as early as 1240. The house, formerly known as the Companys Arms, is one of the earlier houses in the valley. Built as a mill owner's house it became an inn in the 19th century. It owed its name Companys Arms to the East India Company for which the mills of Chalford supplied much of its cloth. It remained an inn until the 1960s when it reverted to its former name of Chalford Place. The house lay derelict for many years until it was recently purchased and is now being restored by the artist Damien Hirst.

=== Surviving mills in Chalford parish ===
- St Mary's Mill
- Clayfields/Ballingers Mill
- Iles Mill
- Belvedere Mill
- Bliss Mills (Bliss, New, Mugmore, Spring and Wood.) Now part of the Chalford industrial estate.
- Woolings Mill (including Sevilles upper mill.)
- Smart Mill (formerly known as Stoneford, Bidmeads, Hoptons and Halliday Mill.)
- Valley or Morton's Mill

The mill race of Ashmeads Mill remains; the mill itself was demolished in the early 1900s.

=== Notable former mill owners' houses ===
- Brookside
- Belvedere Mill House
- Chalford Place
- Chestnut House (Smarts Mill House)
- Green Court
- Old Valley Inn (formerly Clothier's Arms)
- Sevilles House
- Springfield House
- St Mary's Mill House
- Vale House

=== Listed buildings ===
- Grade II*: Chalford Place, St John the Baptist, St Mary's House, Wing Cottage
- Grade II: Baptist Chapel, Church of St Michael and All Angels, Christ Church, France Congregational Church and Hall, Mount Cottage St Mary's, Abnash House

==== Abnash House ====
Abnash House is a seven-bedroom house with seven acres of grounds. It has previously been owned by Cirencester businessman John Coxwell and by singer Alfie Boe, among many others. It was constructed before 1400. The modern grounds include several outbuildings. Abnash (Latin: Abbenesse) was a tithing of Bisley in the 13th century.

== Modern Chalford ==
In February 2008, a plan to reintroduce donkeys as a way of carrying shopping up the steep, narrow hills became public.

On 5 September 2009 Chalford Community Stores allowed customers to purchase shares in the business. The store, which has been running with the aid of a volunteer workforce since 2003, is now affiliated with the independent organisation Co-operatives UK, making the share issue possible. On 4 March 2012 the store and the donkey were featured in an episode of Countryfile. The store was sited within the local church hall but returned to the High Street in May 2014 in the former Seventh Day Adventist Hall. This was made possible by a second community share issue which raised in excess of £50,000 alongside a bank loan and various grants.

== Notable residents ==
Notable residents include James Bradley, the third Astronomer Royal, who died in Chalford in 1762, and the 19th-century sculptor John Thomas. Henry Cooper lived in the village as a child, after being evacuated to Chalford during the Second World War. The artist Walter Goodman lived in Chalford for a short time during 1884-1885, where he painted two landscapes of The Golden Valley, which were exhibited at the Chalford National School in August 1886. The artist Damien Hirst has a studio in the village. Lord Janvrin, former Private Secretary to Elizabeth II, maintains a house in the village and on his retirement was gazetted as Baron Janvrin of Chalford Hill, on 10 October 2007. The Public Relations guru Mark Borkowski lives at Oakridge.

== Brownshill ==
The sub-village of Brownshill is home to the Monastery of Our Lady and St Bernard, a community of eight Bernardine Cistercian nuns, founded in 2006. There is a sister community at the Monastery of Our Lady of Hyning at Warton, near Carnforth.

St Mary of the Angels is a small Roman Catholic church built at Brownshill in the 1930s with funds from two former nurses, Bertha Kessler and Katherine Hudson. The architect was W. D. Caroe, with windows by Douglas Strachan. It is now a redundant church vested in the Friends of Friendless Churches. The church is recorded in the National Heritage List for England as a Grade II listed building.

== Golden Valley ==
The valley from Chalford to Stroud, known as the Golden Valley, is one of Stroud's Five Valleys; it carries the Stroud-Swindon railway (known informally as the Golden Valley line) and the Thames and Severn Canal towards the Cotswolds.

== See also ==
- Aston Down airfield across the Golden Valley from Chalford
