= Monastery of Our Lady of Hyning =

Monastery in Warton, Lancs, England

Coordinates: 54.1535°N 2.7552°W

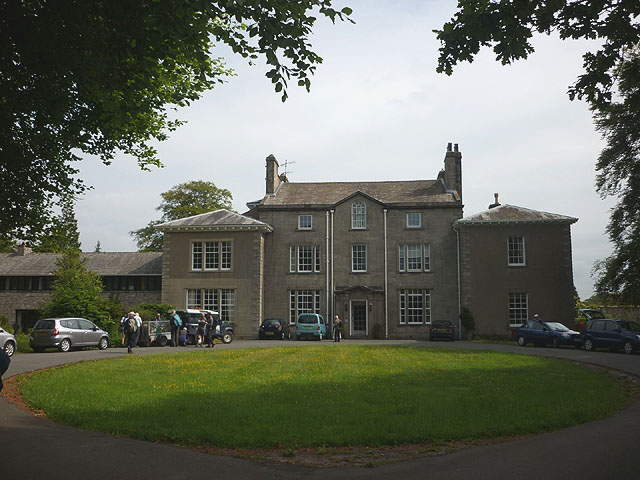
The main building in 2015

The Monastery of Our Lady of Hyning is a community of Bernardine Cistercians in Warton, Lancaster, England, formerly known as St Bernard's Priory and informally called Hyning Monastery. Its grade II listed house has also been known as The Hyning, Hyning Priory, Hyning Hall and Hyning House. It is in the north of the parish of Warton, east of the road to Yealand Conyers.

== House ==
The house was built by Lancaster merchant William Sanderson, and sold in 1809 to John Bolden. Bolden was born John Leonard, but changed his name as a condition of inheriting his uncle William Bolden's estate in 1800. in 1872 the Bolden family had an estate of 246 acres (100 ha) in Warton. By 1950 the house was owned by Arthur Peel, 2nd Earl Peel (1901–1969). His expenditure on renovation work, at a time of post-war restrictions, caused The Hyning to be discussed in Parliament in 1950. It was sold on Lord Peel's death and was acquired by the Cistercians in 1974.

Originally a country house, the original block has two storeys with an attic and three bays. A two-storey wing was added to the right in the mid-19th century, and a similar wing to the left in the mid-20th century. The building is in sandstone, the wings are stuccoed, and the roof is slated. Most of the windows are sashes, some with baseless Tuscan columns as mullions. To the left is the front of a pavilion that includes a Diocletian window and a pediment.

=== Gardens ===
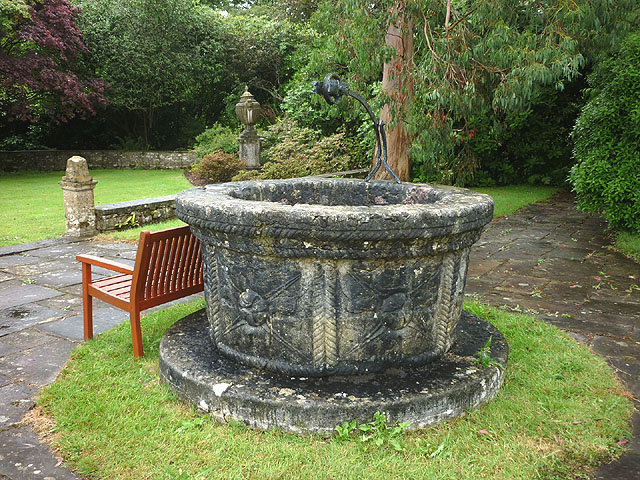
The "wishing well" in the garden, seen in 2015

The gardens were designed in 1950 by Ralph Hancock, known for his design of Derry & Toms roof garden. They are in the Arts and Crafts style. They were the last gardens Hancock designed before his death, and were completed by his son Bramley.

== Monastery ==
In 1974 a group of sisters from the Bernardine Cistercians of Esquermes came from communities in Slough and Westcliffe-on-Sea to found a new community, St Bernard's Priory, which became the Monastery of Our Lady of Hyning. As of 2024 there are nine sisters in the community. The monastery offers guest house accommodation for individuals or groups, while the sisters occupy the former servants' accommodation in a separate wing. An icon studio hosts regular groups, courses and workshops in iconography, the writing of icons.

There are sister communities at Brownshill, Gloucestershire; Lille, France (the mother house of the order); Bafor, Diébougou Department, Burkina Faso; and Goma, Democratic Republic of Congo.
