= St Mary of the Angels Church, Brownshill =

Coordinates: 51.7219°N 2.1708°W

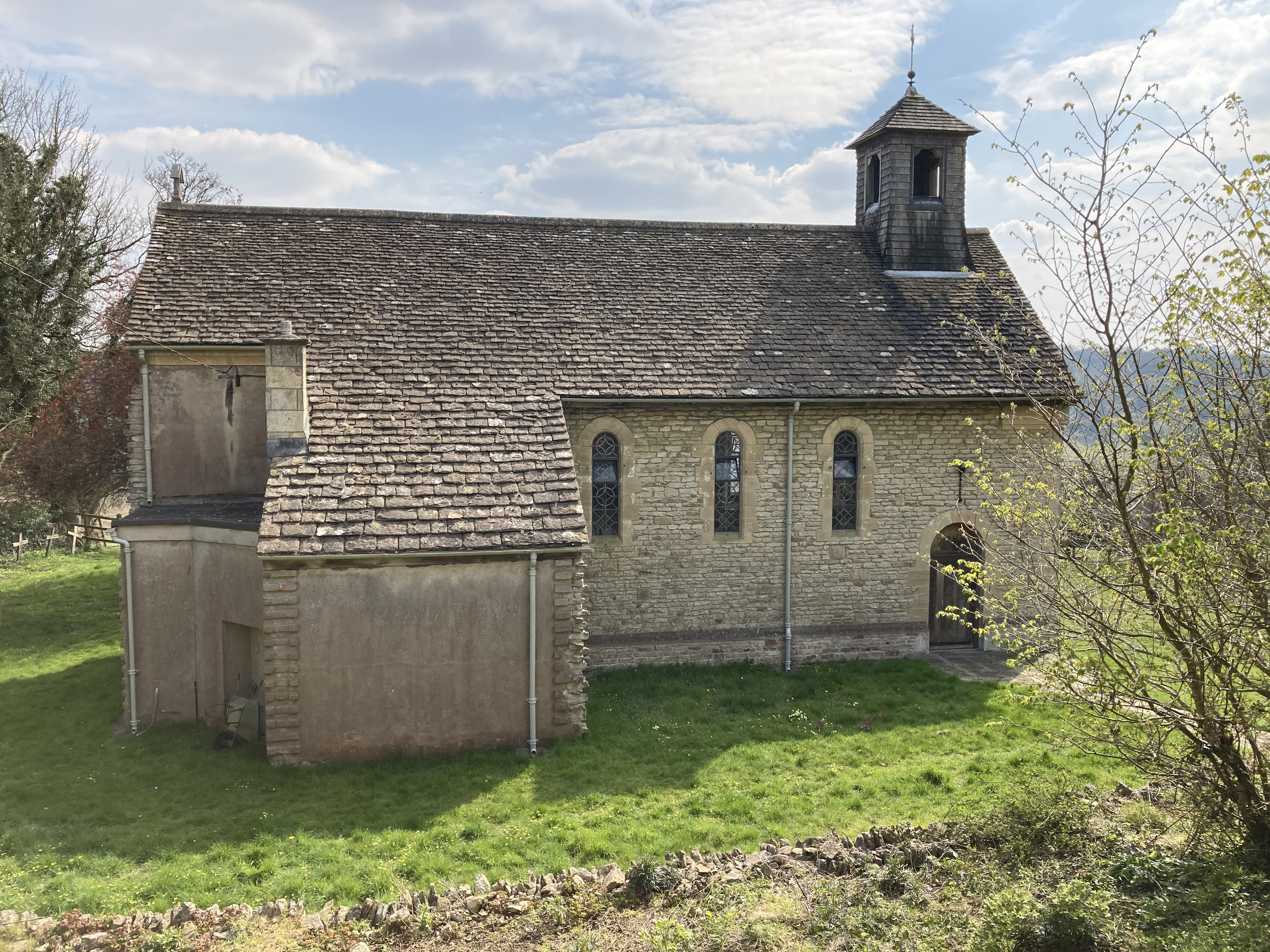
- St Mary of the Angels Church

- Location in Gloucestershire
- OS grid reference: SO 883 026
- Location: Brownshill, Chalford, Gloucestershire
- Country: England
- Denomination: Roman Catholic
- Website: Friends of Friendless Churches

History
- Founded: 1930

Architecture
- Functional status: Redundant
- Heritage designation: Grade II
- Designated: 12 July 2007
- Architect: W. D. Caröe
- Architectural type: Church
- Style: Romanesque Revival
- Completed: 1937

Specifications
- Materials: Limestone, Cotswold stone slate roofs

St Mary of the Angels Church is located to the south of the village of Brownshill in the parish of Chalford, Gloucestershire, England. It is a redundant Roman Catholic church vested in the Friends of Friendless Churches. The church is recorded in the National Heritage List for England as a designated Grade II listed building.

== History ==
The church was constructed between 1930 and 1937 and designed by W. D. Caröe. David Verey and Alan Brooks, in their Gloucester 1 volume of Pevsner's Buildings of England, describe it as a "late and very distinctive" example of his work. It was built to serve a religious community called Templewood. This had been created in 1927 by Bertha Kessler and Katherine Hudson. Members of the First Aid Nursing Yeomanry in the First World War and observing the mental trauma suffered by servicemen in the conflict, Kessler and Hudson determined to give spiritual healing to people suffering from mental illness. St Mary's was built as a chapel to serve the community, both of the nurses giving £1,000 towards it. Stained glass windows were added the following year. In 1951 the community was made a Tertiary Chapter of the Dominican Order. The chapel continued in daily use by the community until 2006. It was vested in the Friends of Friendless Churches during 2010, being the first Roman Catholic church to be accepted by the charity, and the most modern church to come into their care.

== Architecture ==
=== Exterior ===
St Mary's is constructed in limestone rubble and ashlar, with Cotswold stone slate roofs, and a timber-shingled bellcote. Its architectural style is Romanesque, although Verey and Brooks detect "a hint of Baroque" at the church's western end. It is rectangular in plan, with an apsidal sanctuary. On the north side is a vestry with a confessional, and a porch in the angle between the vestry and the church. The west end is topped by a truncated round arch, and it contains a doorway with a round arch, above which is a rectangular window. Along the south side of the church are five bays, each containing a narrow round-headed window, and a door towards the east end. The north side has similar windows, a door towards the west, and the porch and vestry. At the east end is a full gable. A planned house for the resident priest, which was to stand adjacent to the church, was not built.

=== Interior ===
The interior of the church is simple. At the west end is a gallery, its panels decorated with diamond-shaped carving. The nave is floored with parquet, and with terracotta tiles. Between the nave and the sanctuary is a large Norman-type arch, decorated with Romanesque chevrons. In the sanctuary is a stone altar table. Three of the windows contain stained glass depicting the founders of the community and a benefactor. Their design is attributed to Douglas Strachan. Under the central window is a panel containing gold mosaic. Between the doors leading to the vestry and the confessional is a niche. The fittings to the doors are in Arts and Crafts style. Adjacent to each entrance door is a holy water stoup.

== Illustrations ==
More information and illustrations can be found using the External Link to Friends of Friendless Churches.

== Sources ==
- Verey, David; Brooks, Alan (2000). Gloucestershire 1: The Cotswolds. The Buildings of England. New Haven, US and London: Yale University Press. ISBN 9780300097337. OCLC 863472443.
