= Five Valleys =

Valleys in Gloucestershire, England

Coordinates: 51.743°N 2.216°W

The Five Valleys are a group of valleys in Gloucestershire, England, which converge on the town of Stroud at the western edge of the Cotswolds. The Five Valleys are notable both for the landscape, which attracts visitors, and their role in industrial development of Britain starting with the wool trade in the 11th century, and developing through cloth manufacturing in the 18th century. Despite very poor roads, the use of the rivers and streams in developing links to other centres, via, for example the Thames and Severn Canal, helped the Five Valleys to prosper.

The valleys are as follows:

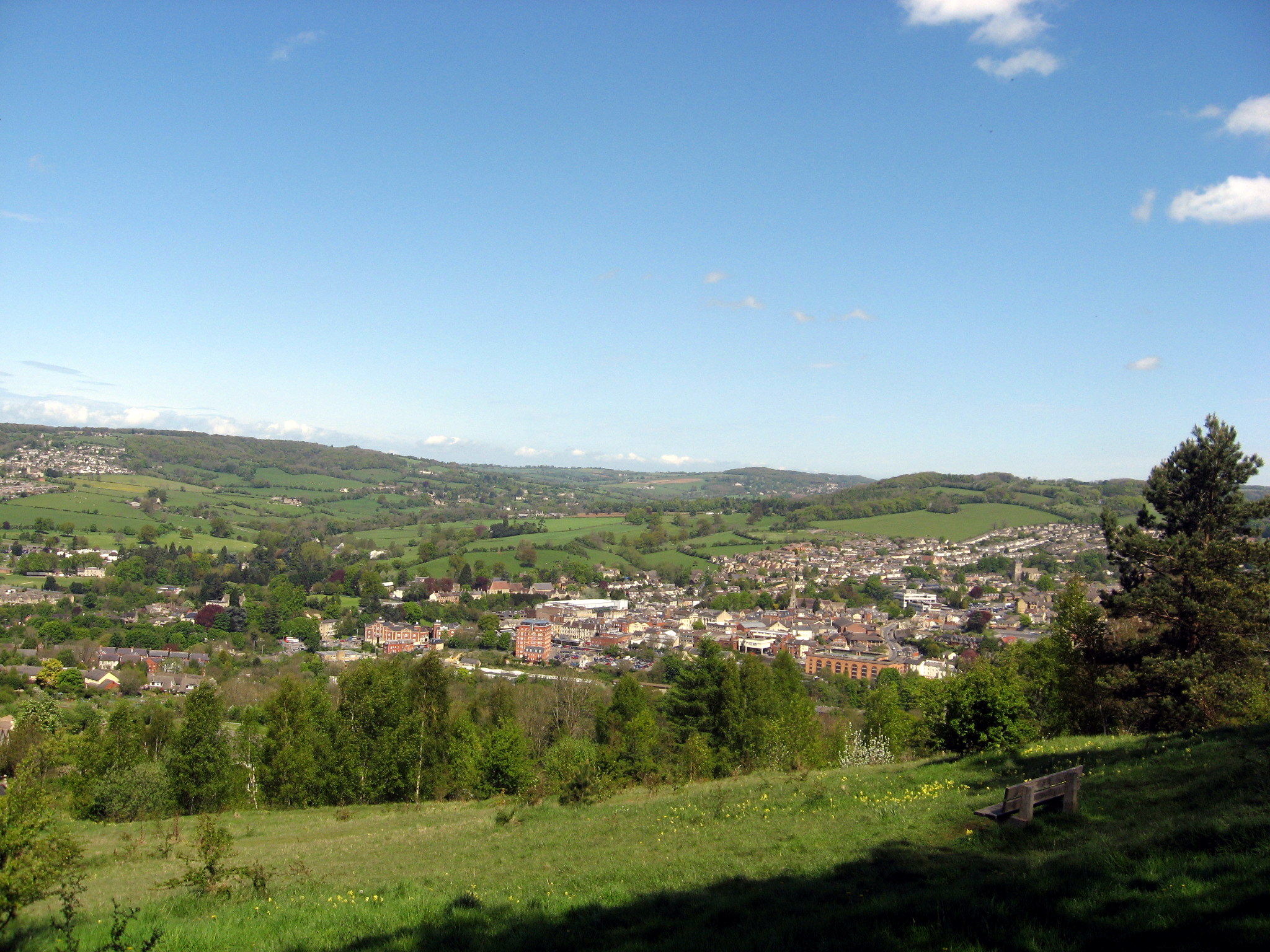
Part of the five valleys from Rodborough hill

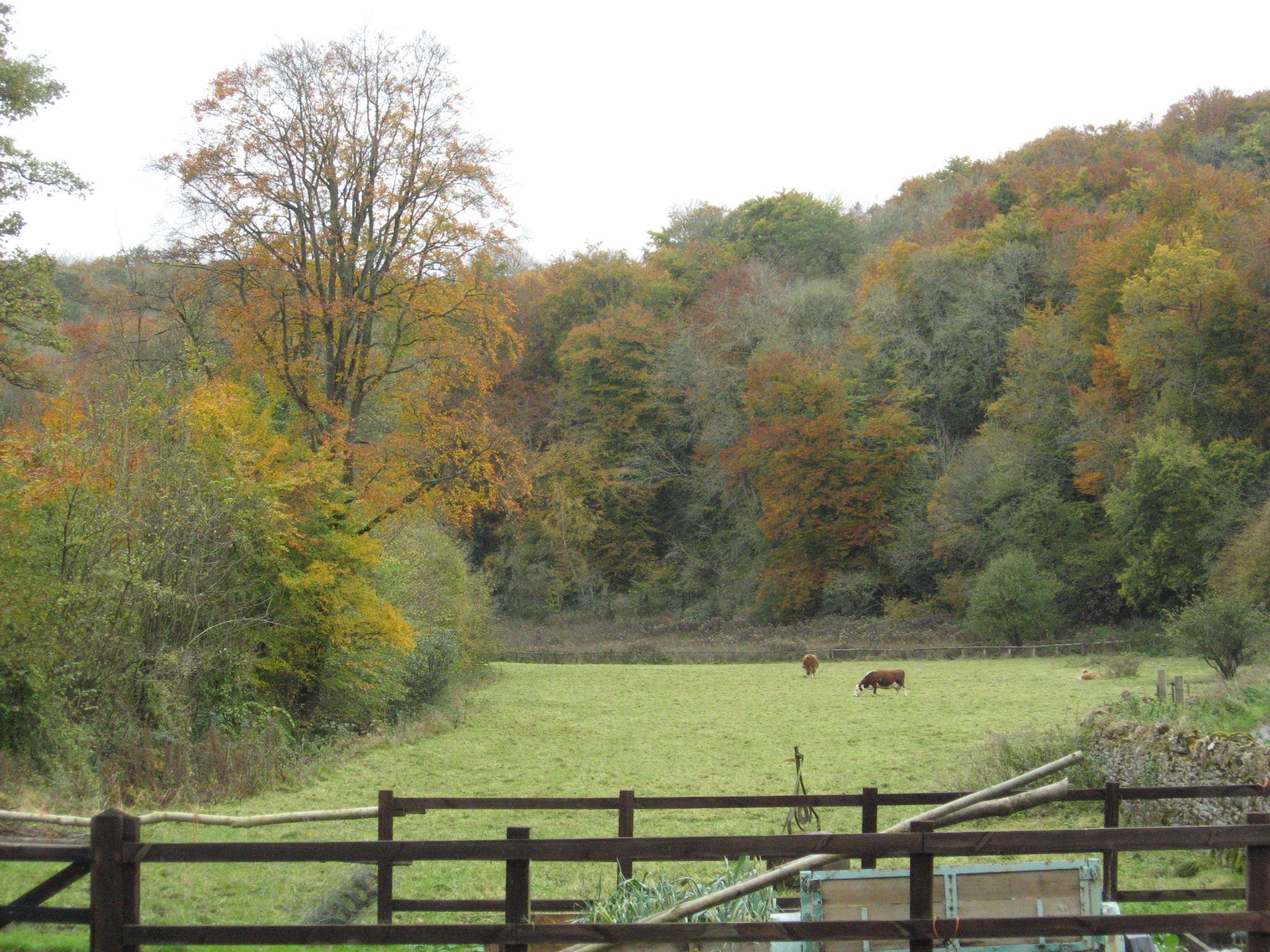
A field at Baker's Mill in the Golden Valley

- The Chalford valley (also known as the "Golden Valley")
- The Nailsworth Valley – runs from Cherington, through Avening and along to Nailsworth
- The Ruscombe Valley
- The Slad Valley (of Cider with Rosie fame)
- The Painswick Valley

The Five Valleys Walk is a popular circular walk of some 21 miles (34 kilometres) around Stroud. It has been held annually since 1987, in aid of the Stroud-based Meningitis Trust, usually on the last Sunday in September. A more exacting version of this walk has also been published, as the "Five Valleys Circuit"; this includes an ascent over the high ground of Selsley Common rather than the charity walk's low-level route from Stonehouse to Nailsworth, up the old railway line by the Nailsworth Stream.

The Five Valleys Shopping Centre in Stroud is named after the Five Valleys.

== Links ==
Route of the Annual Five Valleys Walk
